= Mediterranean dry woodlands and steppe =

Mediterranean forests, woodlands, and scrub ecoregion of North Africa

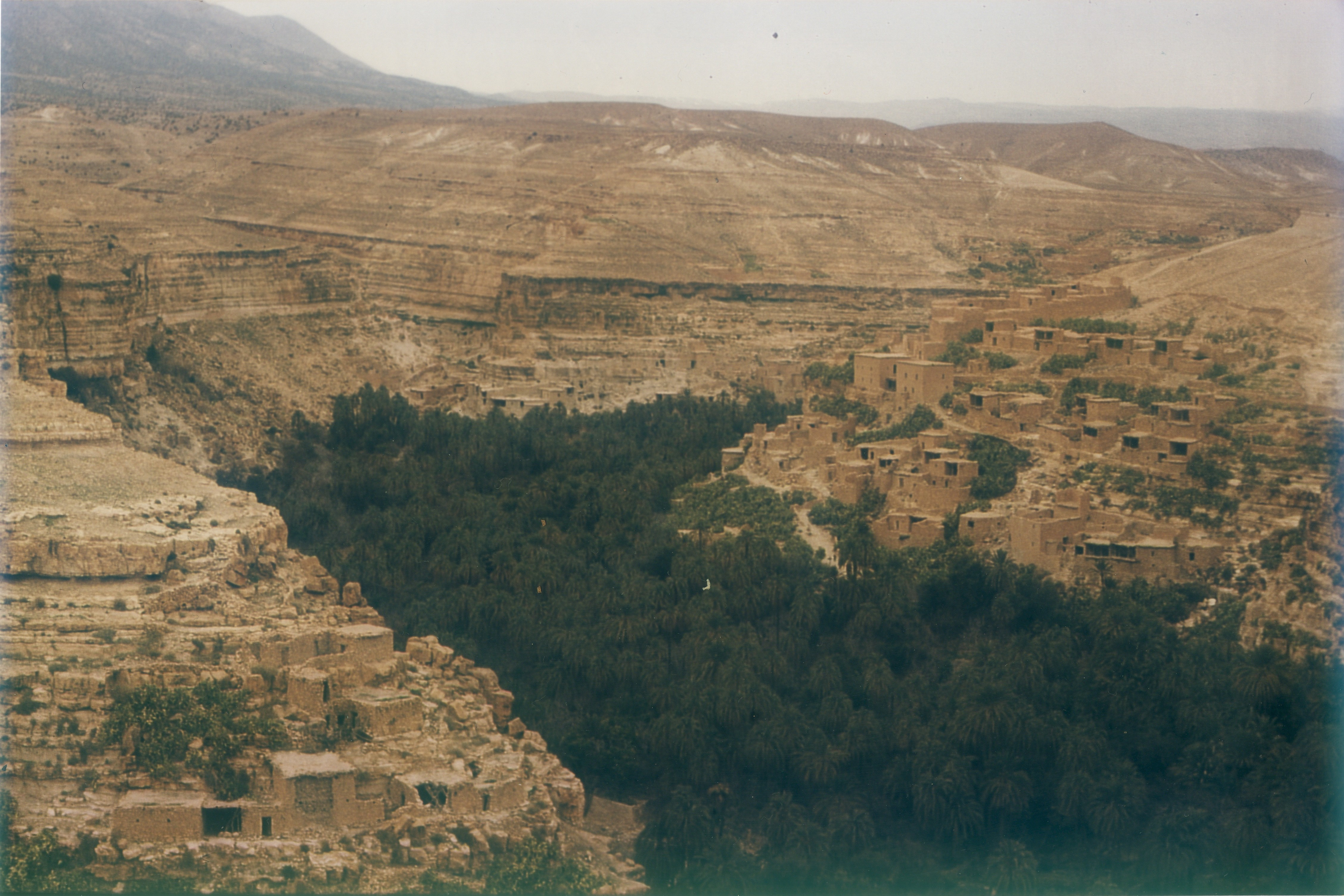
- Oasis near Biskra, Algeria

- map of the Mediterranean dry woodlands and steppe

Ecology
- Realm: Palearctic
- Biome: Mediterranean forests, woodlands, and scrub

Geography
- Area: 291,700 km^{2} (112,600 sq mi)
- Countries: Algeria, Egypt, Libya, Morocco, Tunisia

The Mediterranean dry woodlands and steppe is a Mediterranean forests, woodlands, and scrub ecoregion of North Africa. It occupies interior plateaus and mountain ranges of the Maghreb region, lying generally between the coastal Mediterranean woodlands and forests to the north and the Sahara to the south.

== Setting ==
The Mediterranean woodlands and forests occupy an area of 291,700 square kilometers (112,600 sq mi) in Morocco, Algeria, Tunisia, Libya, and Egypt. The main portion of the ecoregions extends from the southern slopes of the High Atlas in eastern Morocco across Algeria and Tunisia, where it meets the Mediterranean shore at the Gulf of Gabes. In Algeria, it lies south of the coastal Tell Atlas, covering the high plateau and Saharan Atlas. Further east, several enclaves of the ecoregion lie nearer the coast. In western Tripolitania it lies to the Mediterranean shore, and on the Cyrenaica peninsula it forms a belt between the Mediterranean woodlands and forests and the Sahara. The easternmost portion of the ecoregion is a small coastal enclave lying just west of the Nile Delta in Egypt, near the city of Alexandria.

== Climate ==
The climate of the region is arid and annual rainfall is between 100 and 300 mm. The rainfall occurs mainly during the winter months, normally as intermittent storms. It can get as cold as 0°C during the winter and temperatures can climb to 40 °C during the summer months, the mean annual temperature is around 18 °C.

== Settlement ==
The human population of these regions is low, settled agriculture is only viable in valleys where there is a supply of water, such as dayas, depressions with good quality soil, and the beds of wadis. In these areas it is possible to cultivate fodder and food crops. Such agriculture may not be possible every year and thus farmers shift to follow the rainfall. Population densities are low and most of the population is somewhat nomadic, however, there are some permanent settlements in coastal towns where the main economic activity is fishing.

== Flora ==
At higher elevations on the plateau, different types of steppe vegetation dominate depending on soil conditions, for example in the slopes and foothills of the Atlas Mountains there is a steppe dominated by Stipa tenacissima whereas Artemisia herba-alba dominates in where there are silty slopes and depressions; Lygeum spartum steppe grows in sandy soils. Where sand accumulates there is a mosaic of vegetation types including patches of Thymeleae muicrophila, Aristida pungens, Retama retam, and of tamarisks Tamarix spp. In depressions the vegetation includes a scrub consisting of the Mount Atlas mastic tree Pistacia atlantica, Ziziphus lotus, Asterichus graveolens and mallows Malva spp.

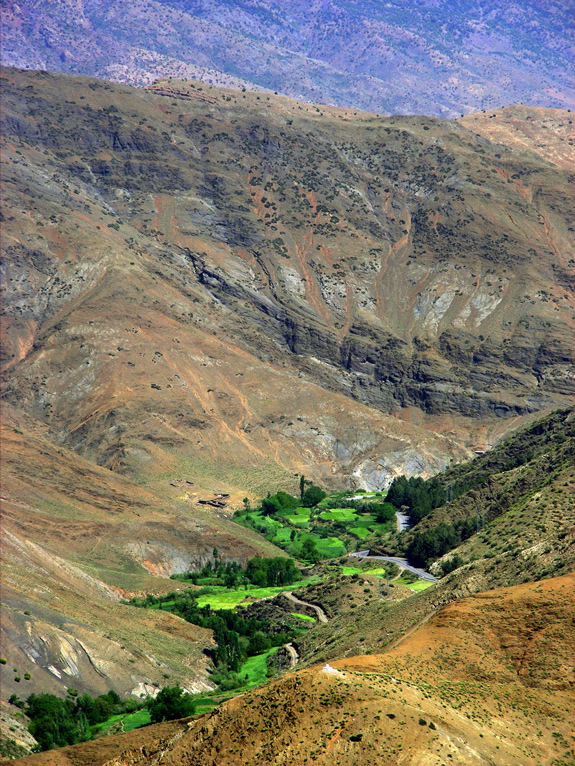
High Atlas Mountains

== Fauna ==
The fauna lacks endemism and most species found are widespread. There are abundant small mammals including many gerbil species, the endangered four-toed jerboa Allactaga tetradactyla and the Günther's vole Microtus guentheri. Barbary sheep Ammotragus lervia and mountain gazelle Gazella cuvieri still have populations in the region, as does the striped hyena Htaena hyaena, and these are mixed with mammals which have more European origins such as wild boar Sus scrofa, Eurasian otter Lutra lutra and red fox Vulpes vulpes. These European affinities are echoed in the herpetofauna where grass snake Natrix natrix, Sahara frog Pelophylax saharicus and the European green toad Bufo viridis mixed with the African common toad Amietophrynus regularis. The North African ostrich Struthio camelus camelus occurred in this region but is now largely extirpated.
