= Savanna =

Mixed woodland-grassland ecosystem

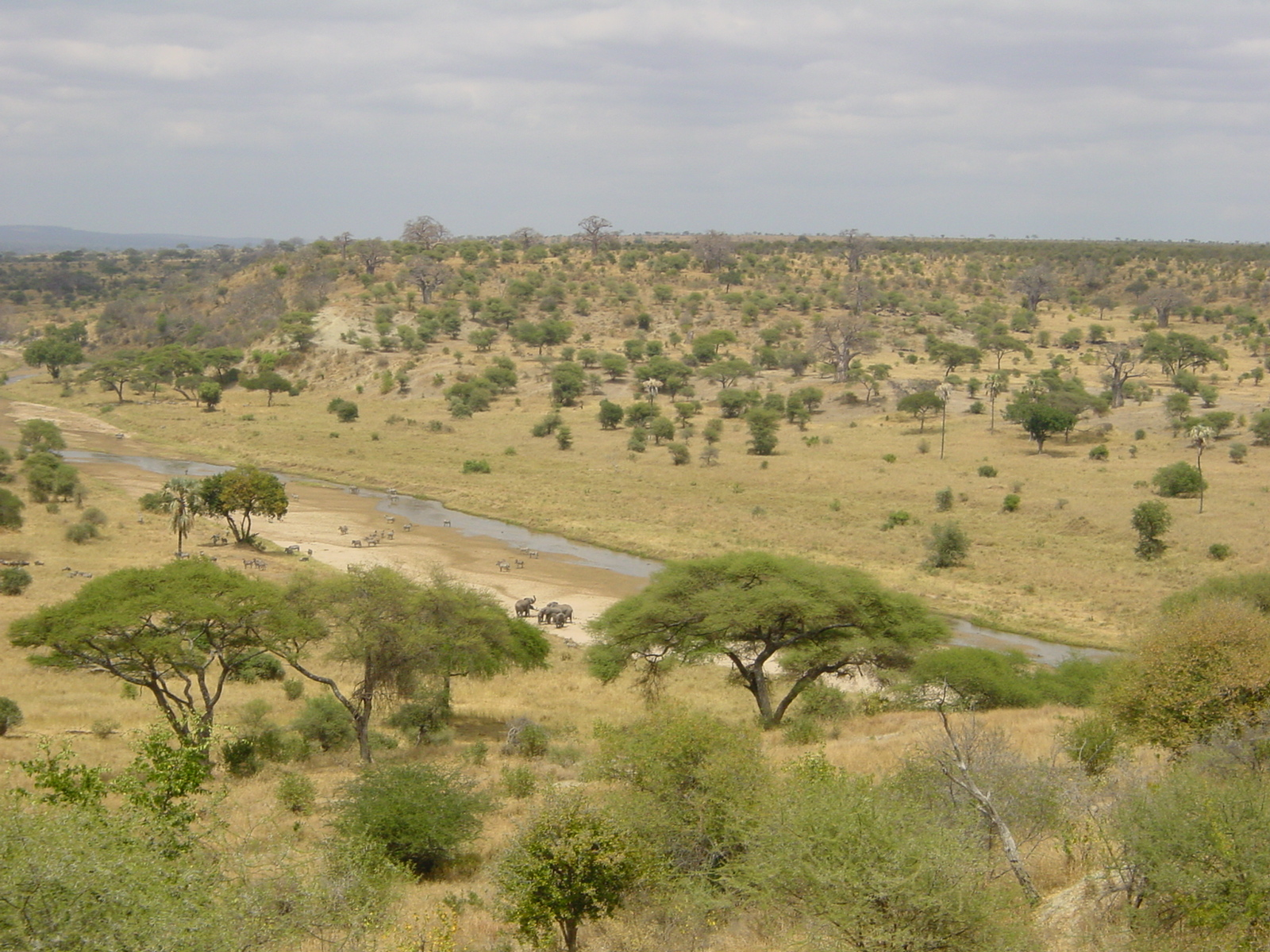
A tree savanna at Tarangire National Park in Tanzania in East Africa

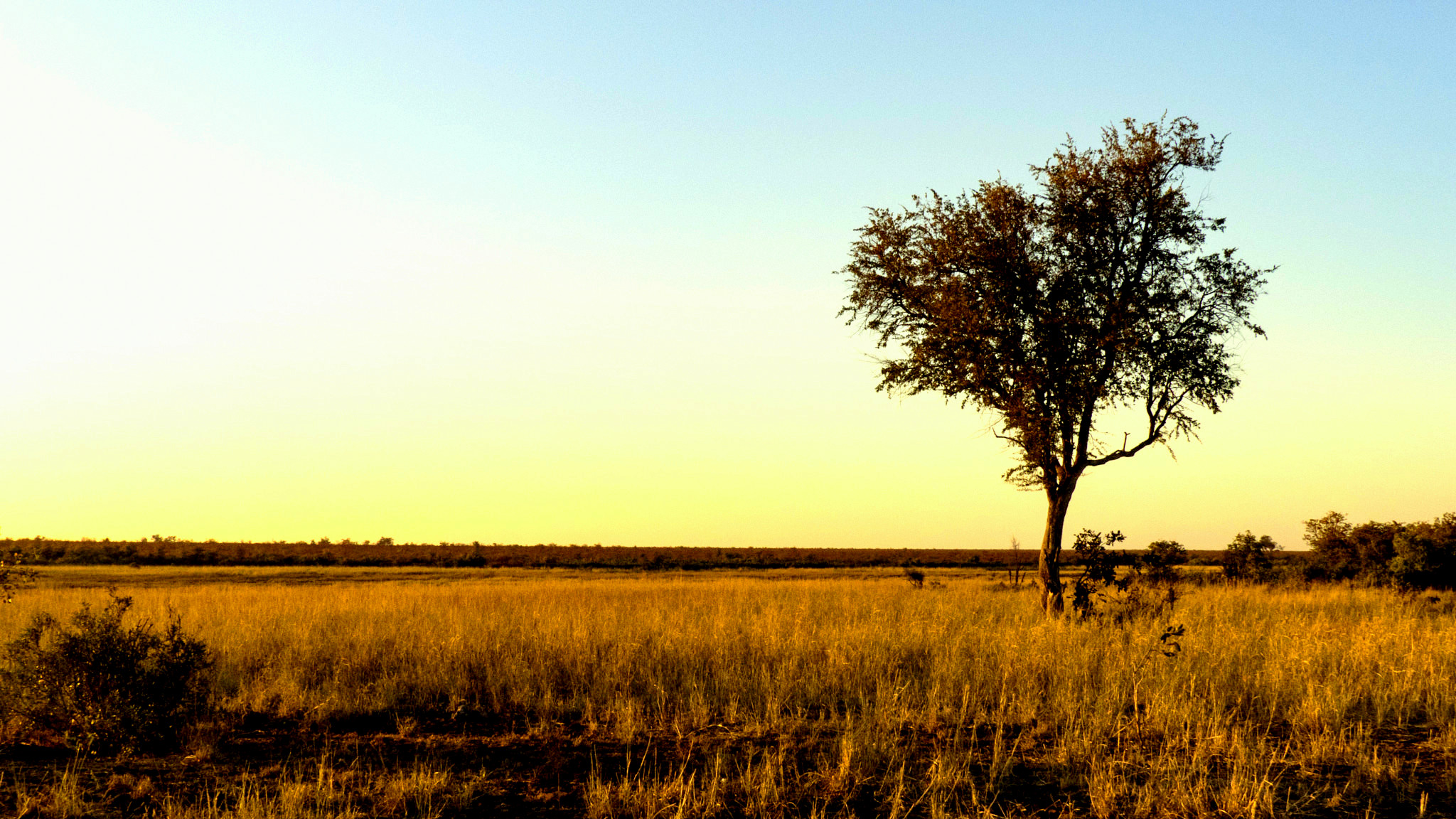
A grass savanna at Kruger National Park in South Africa

A savanna or savannah is a mixed woodland-grassland (i.e. grassy woodland) biome and ecosystem characterised by the trees being sufficiently widely spaced so that the canopy does not close. The open canopy allows sufficient light to reach the ground to support an unbroken herbaceous layer consisting primarily of grasses. Four savanna forms exist; savanna woodland, where trees and shrubs form a light canopy; tree savanna, with scattered trees and shrubs; shrub savanna, with distributed shrubs; and grass savanna, where trees and shrubs are mostly nonexistent.

Savannas maintain an open canopy despite a high tree density. It is often believed that savannas feature widely spaced, scattered trees. However, in many savannas, tree densities are higher and trees are more regularly spaced than in forests. The South American savanna types cerrado sensu stricto and cerrado dense typically have densities of trees similar to or higher than that found in South American tropical forests, with savanna ranging from 800 to 3300 trees per hectare (trees/ha) and adjacent forests with 800–2000 trees/ha. Similarly Guinean savanna has 129 trees/ha, compared to 103 for riparian forest, while Eastern Australian sclerophyll forests have average tree densities of approximately 100 per hectare, comparable to savannas in the same region.

Savannas are also characterised by seasonal water availability, with the majority of rainfall confined to one season. They are associated with several types of biomes, and are frequently in a transitional zone between forest and desert or grassland, though mostly a transition between desert to forest. Savanna covers approximately 20% of the Earth's land area. Unlike the prairies in North America and steppes in Eurasia, which feature cold winters, savannas are mostly located in areas having warm to hot climates, such as in Africa, Australia, South America, and India.

== Etymology ==
The word derives from the Spanish sabana, which is itself a loanword from Taíno, which means "treeless grassland" in the West Indies.

The word originally entered English as the Zauana in a description of the ilands of the kinges of Spayne from 1555. (Note: Richard Eden: "The palace of this Comogrus, is ſituate at the foote of a ſtiepe hyll well cultured. Hauynge towarde the ſouthe a playne of twelue leages in breadth and veary frutefull. This playne, they caule Zauana.") This was equivalent in the orthography of the times to zavana (see history of V). Peter Martyr reported it as the local name for the plain around Comagre, the court of the cacique Carlos in present-day Panama. The accounts are inexact, (Note: The account of Peter Martyr itself differs in places, variously placing Comagre 25 leagues west of and accessible by ship from Dariena or 70 leagues (roughly 290 kilometers or 180 miles) west of Dariena and beside a river flowing into the southern ocean.) but this is usually placed in present-day Madugandí or at points on the nearby Guna Yala coast opposite Ustupo or on Point Mosquitos. These areas are now either given over to modern cropland or jungle.

English explorer William Dampier, in his 1697–1705 volumes of A New Voyage Round the World, used the spelling "savannah" (with the terminal 'h') throughout, which became the British English form of the word. Dampier describes woodlands he saw on the island of "Trist" (Isla del Triste or Trist Island) in the 'Bay of Campeachy' (Bay of Campeche) in the Gulf of Mexico: "The West part is dry and sandy, bearing a sort of long Grass, growing in Tufts very thin. This is a sort of Savannah, with some large Palmeto Trees growing in it". He also used that spelling for descriptions of similar environments in Sumatra and the Philippines in accounts of a later voyage to New Holland (northern Australia).

== Distribution ==
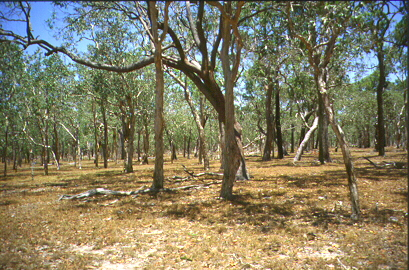
A savanna woodland in Northern Australia demonstrating the regular tree spacing characteristic of some savannas

Many grassy landscapes and mixed communities of trees, shrubs, and grasses were described as savanna before the middle of the 19th century, when the concept of a tropical savanna climate became established. The Köppen climate classification system was strongly influenced by effects of temperature and precipitation upon tree growth, and oversimplified assumptions resulted in a tropical savanna classification concept which considered it as a "climatic climax" formation. The common usage to describe vegetation now conflicts with a simplified yet widespread climatic concept. The divergence has sometimes caused areas such as extensive savannas north and south of the Congo and Amazon Rivers to be excluded from mapped savanna categories.

In different parts of North America, the word "savanna" has been used interchangeably with "barrens", "prairie", "glade", "grassland" and "oak opening". Different authors have defined the lower limits of savanna tree coverage as 5–10% and upper limits range as 25–80% of an area. Two factors common to all savanna environments are rainfall variations from year to year, and dry season wildfires. In the Americas, e.g. in Belize, Central America, savanna vegetation is similar from Mexico to South America and to the Caribbean. The distinction between woodland and savanna is vague and therefore the two can be combined into a single biome as both woodlands and savannas feature open-canopied trees with crowns not usually interlinking (mostly forming 25–60% cover).

Over many large tropical areas, the dominant biome (forest, savanna or grassland) can not be predicted only by the climate, as historical events also play a key role—fire activity, for example. In some areas, indeed, it is possible for there to be multiple stable biomes. The annual rainfall ranges from 500 mm (19.69 in) to 1,270 mm (50.00 in) per year, with the precipitation being more common in six or eight months of the year, followed by a period of drought. Savannas may at times be classified as forests.

In climatic geomorphology it has been noted that many savannas occur in areas of pediplains and inselbergs. It has been posited that river incision is not prominent but that rivers in savanna landscapes erode more by lateral migration. Flooding and associated sheet wash have been proposed as dominant erosion processes in savanna plains.

== Ecology ==
The savannas of tropical America comprise broadleaved trees such as Curatella, Byrsonima, and Bowdichia, with grasses such as Leersia and Paspalum. The bean relative Prosopis is common in the Argentinian savannas. In the East African savannas, acacias, Combretum, baobabs, Borassus, and Euphorbia are common vegetation genera. Drier savannas there feature spiny shrubs and grasses, such as Andropogon, Hyparrhenia, and Themeda. Wetter savannas include Brachystegia trees and Pennisetum purpureum, and elephant grass type. West African savanna trees include Anogeissus, Combretum, and Strychnos. Indian savannas are mostly cleared, but the reserved ones feature acacias, Mimosa, and Zizyphus over a grass cover comprising Sehima and Dichanthium. The Australian savanna is abundant with sclerophyllous evergreen vegetation, which include the eucalyptus, as well as Acacia, Bauhinia, and Pandanus with grasses such as Heteropogon and kangaroo grass (Themeda).

Animals in the African savanna generally include the giraffe, elephant, buffalo, zebra, gnu, hippopotamus, rhinoceros, and antelope, where they rely on grass and/or tree foliage to survive. In the Australian savanna, mammals in the family Macropodidae predominate, such as kangaroos and wallabies, though cattle, horses, camels, donkeys and the Asian water buffalo, among others, have been introduced by humans.

== Threats ==
It is estimated that less than three percent of savanna ecosystems can be classified as highly intact. Reasons for savanna degradation are manifold, as outlined below.

=== Changes in fire management ===
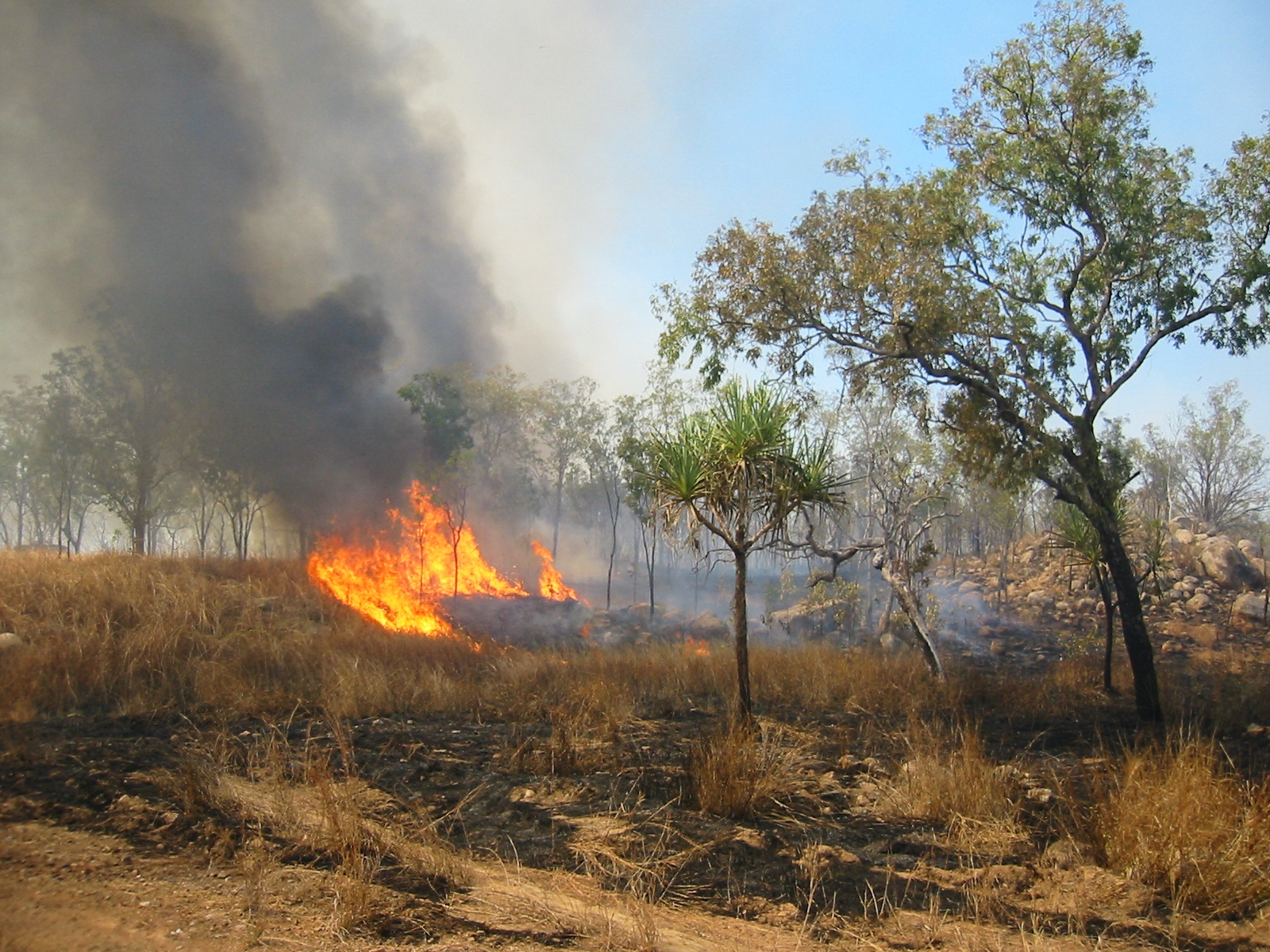
Bushfire in Kakadu National Park, Australia

Savannas are subject to regular wildfires and the ecosystem appears to be the result of human use of fire. For example, Native Americans created the Pre-Columbian woodlands of North America by periodically burning where fire-resistant plants were the dominant species. Fire-stick farming appears to have been responsible for the widespread occurrence of savanna in tropical Australia and New Guinea, and savannas in India are a result of human fire use. The maquis shrub savannas of the Mediterranean region were likewise created and maintained by anthropogenic fire.

Intentional controlled burns typically create fires confined to the herbaceous layer that do little long term damage to mature trees. This prevents more catastrophic wildfires that could do much more damage. However, these fires either kill or suppress tree seedlings, thus preventing the establishment of a continuous tree canopy which would prevent further grass growth. Prior to European settlement aboriginal land use practices, including fire, influenced vegetation and may have maintained and modified savanna flora. It has been suggested by many authors that aboriginal burning created a structurally more open savanna landscape. Aboriginal burning certainly created a habitat mosaic that probably increased biodiversity and changed the structure of woodlands and geographic range of numerous woodland species. It has been suggested by many authors that with the removal or alteration of traditional burning regimes many savannas are being replaced by forest and shrub thickets with little herbaceous layer.

The consumption of herbage by introduced grazers in savanna woodlands has led to a reduction in the amount of fuel available for burning and resulted in fewer and cooler fires. The introduction of exotic pasture legumes has also led to a reduction in the need to burn to produce a flush of green growth because legumes retain high nutrient levels throughout the year, and because fires can have a negative impact on legume populations which causes a reluctance to burn.

=== Grazing and browsing animals ===
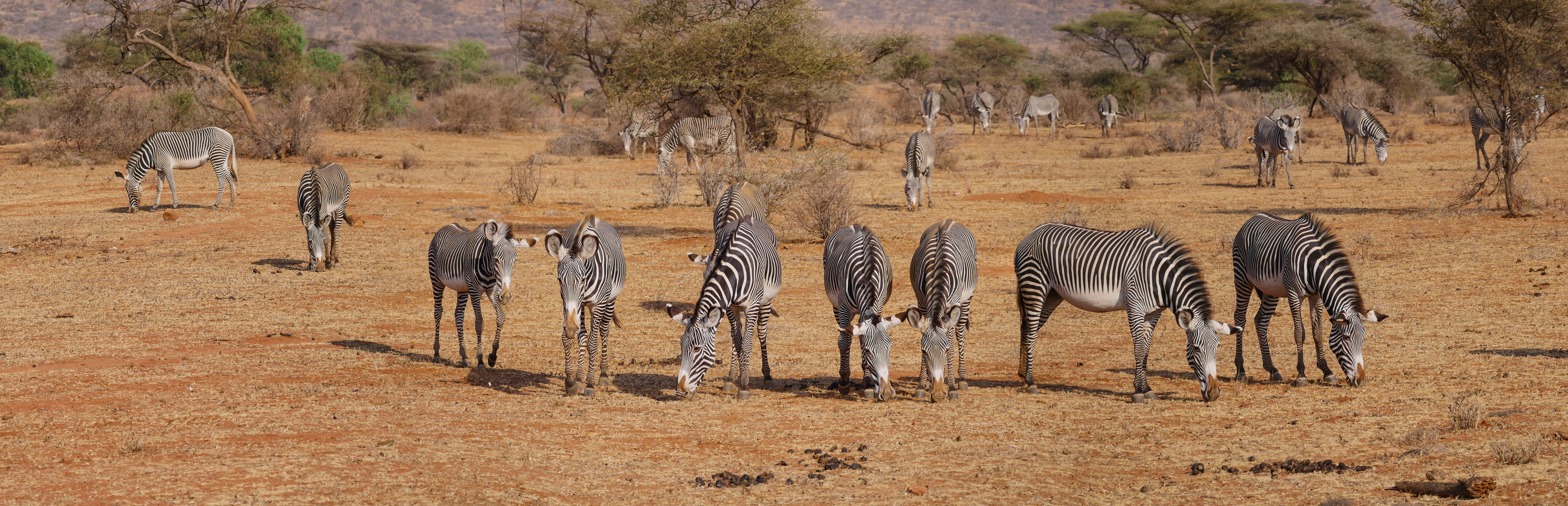
Grevy's zebras grazing

The closed forest types such as broadleaf forests and rainforests are usually not grazed owing to the closed structure precluding grass growth, and hence offering little opportunity for grazing. In contrast the open structure of savannas allows the growth of a herbaceous layer and is commonly used for grazing domestic livestock. As a result, much of the world's savannas have undergone change as a result of grazing by sheep, goats and cattle, ranging from changes in pasture composition to woody plant encroachment.

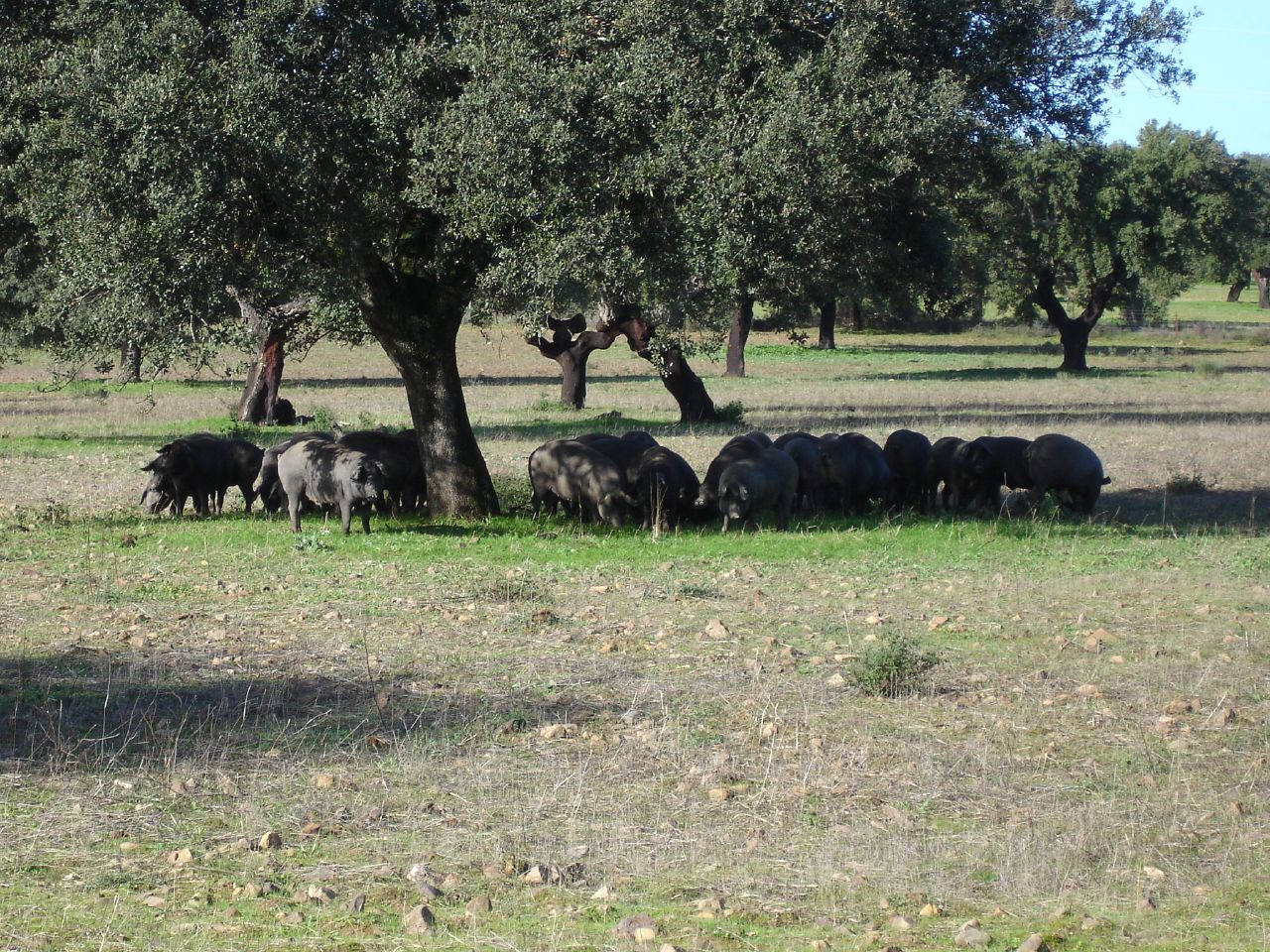
Iberian pigs feeding on acorns of an holm oak

The removal of grass by grazing affects the woody plant component of woodland systems in two major ways. Grasses compete with woody plants for water in the topsoil and removal by grazing reduces this competitive effect, potentially boosting tree growth. In addition to this effect, the removal of fuel reduces both the intensity and the frequency of fires which may control woody plant species. Grazing animals can have a more direct effect on woody plants by the browsing of palatable woody species. There is evidence that unpalatable woody plants have increased under grazing in savannas. Grazing also promotes the spread of weeds in savannas by the removal or reduction of the plants which would normally compete with potential weeds and hinder establishment. In addition to this, cattle and horses are implicated in the spread of the seeds of weed species such as prickly acacia (Acacia nilotica) and stylo (Stylosanthes species). Alterations in savanna species composition brought about by grazing can alter ecosystem function, and are exacerbated by overgrazing and poor land management practices.

Introduced grazing animals can also affect soil condition through physical compaction and break-up of the soil caused by the hooves of animals and through the erosion effects caused by the removal of protective plant cover. Such effects are most likely to occur on land subjected to repeated and heavy grazing. The effects of overstocking are often worst on soils of low fertility and in low rainfall areas below 500 mm, as most soil nutrients in these areas tend to be concentrated in the surface so any movement of soils can lead to severe degradation. Alteration in soil structure and nutrient levels affects the establishment, growth and survival of plant species and in turn can lead to a change in woodland structure and composition. That being said, impact of grazing animals can be reduced. Looking at Elephant impact on Savannas, the overall impact is reduced in the presence of rainfall and fences.

=== Tree clearing ===
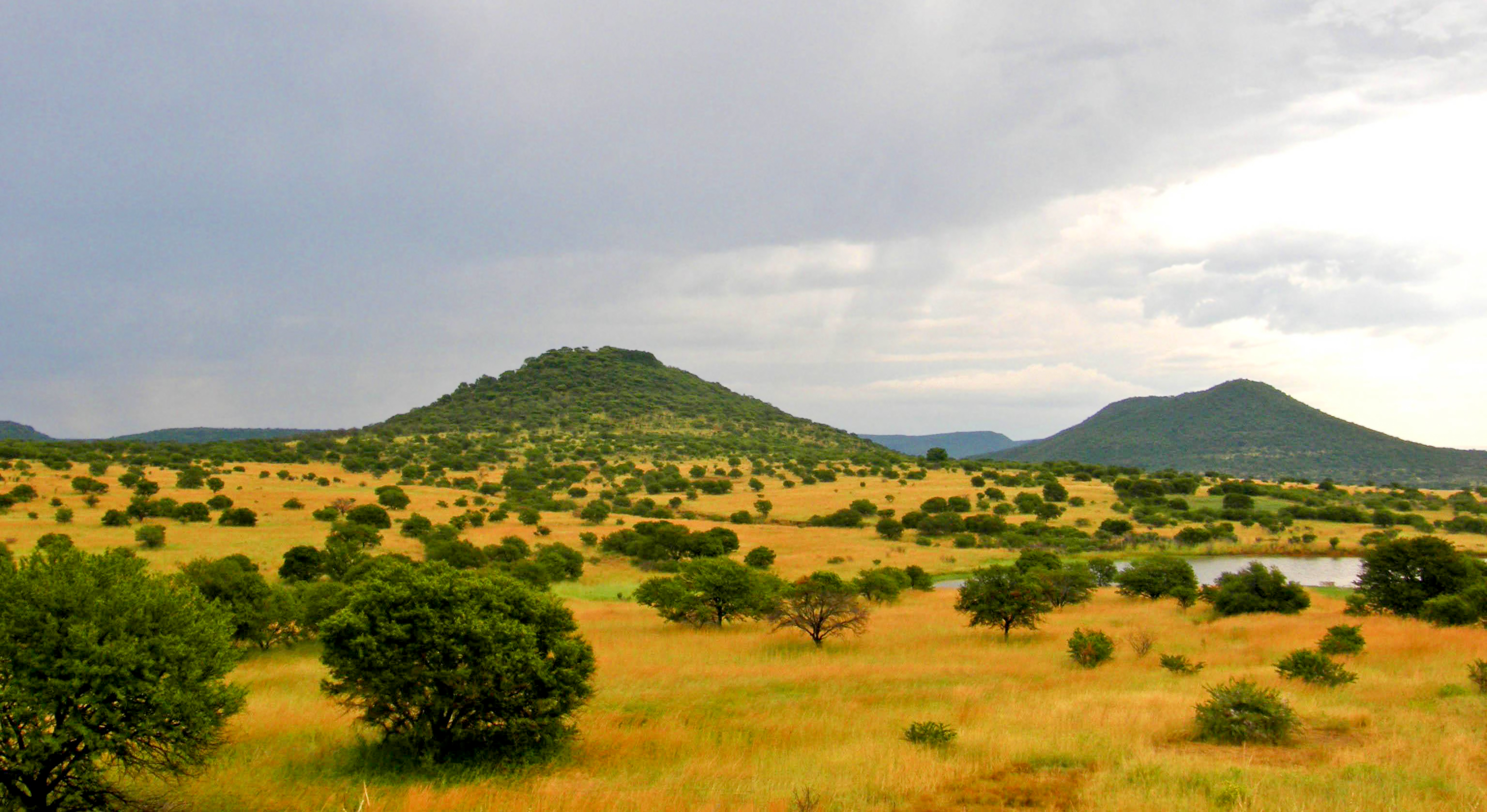
Savanna in eastern South Africa

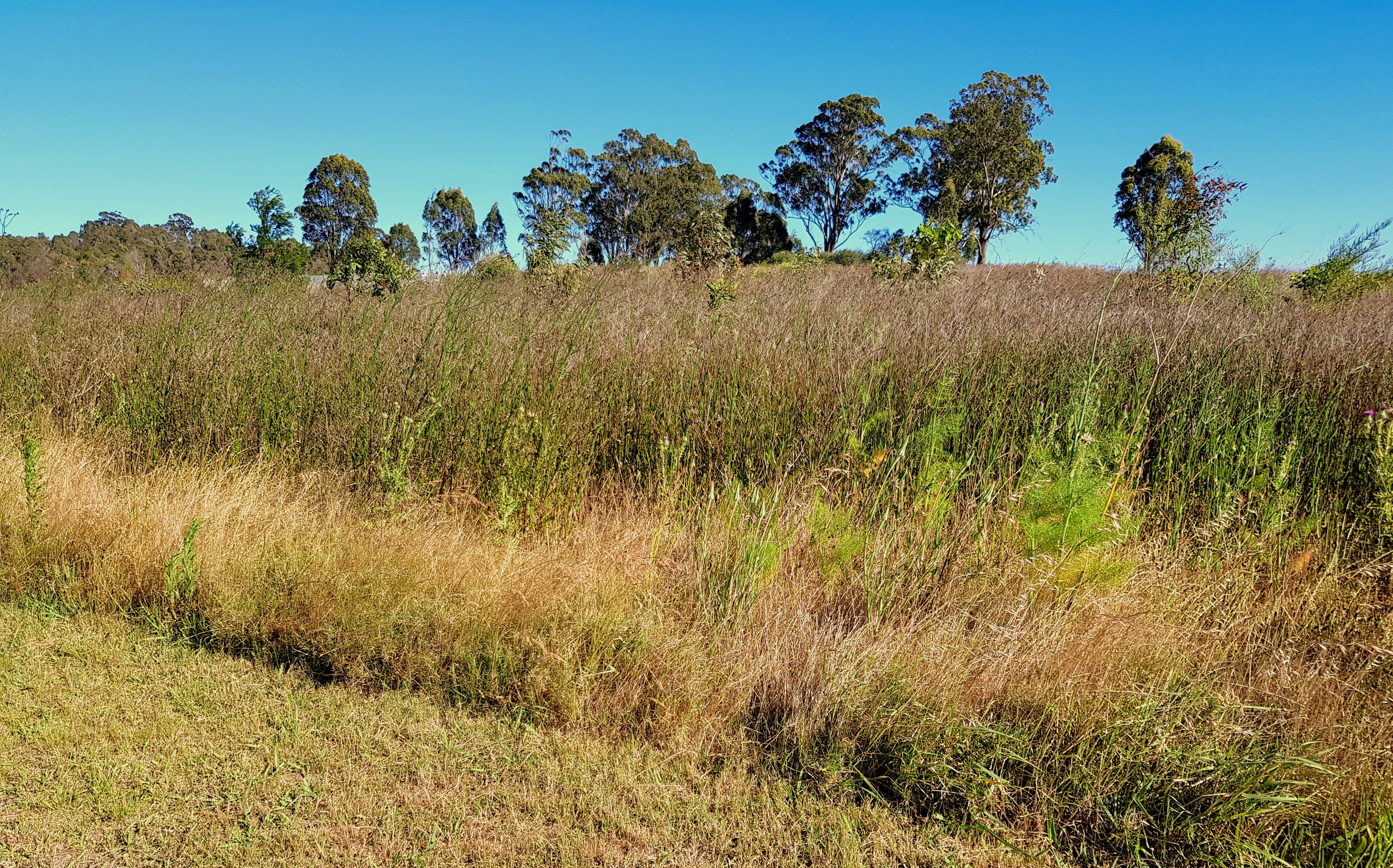
Eucalyptus savanna in Western Sydney

Large areas of Australian and South American savannas have been cleared of trees, and this clearing continues today. For example, land clearing and fracking threaten the Northern Territory, Australia savanna, and 4,800 km^{2} (1,900 sq mi) of savanna were being cleared annually in Queensland in the 2000s, primarily to improve pasture production. Substantial savanna areas have been cleared of woody vegetation and much of the area that remains today is vegetation that has been disturbed by either clearing or thinning at some point in the past.

Clearing is carried out by the grazing industry in an attempt to increase the quality and quantity of feed available for stock and to improve the management of livestock. The removal of trees from savanna land removes the competition for water from the grasses present, and can lead to a two to fourfold increase in pasture production, as well as improving the quality of the feed available. Since stock carrying capacity is strongly correlated with herbage yield, there can be major financial benefits from the removal of trees, such as assisting with grazing management: regions of dense tree and shrub cover harbors predators, leading to increased stock losses, for example, while woody plant cover hinders mustering in both sheep and cattle areas.

A number of techniques have been employed to clear or kill woody plants in savannas. Early pastoralists used felling and girdling, the removal of a ring of bark and sapwood, as a means of clearing land. In the 1950s arboricides suitable for stem injection were developed. War-surplus heavy machinery was made available, and these were used for either pushing timber, or for pulling using a chain and ball strung between two machines. These two new methods of timber control, along with the introduction and widespread adoption of several new pasture grasses and legumes promoted a resurgence in tree clearing. The 1980s also saw the release of soil-applied arboricides, notably tebuthiuron, that could be utilised without cutting and injecting each individual tree.

In many ways "artificial" clearing, particularly pulling, mimics the effects of fire and, in savannas adapted to regeneration after fire as most Queensland savannas are, there is a similar response to that after fire. Tree clearing in many savanna communities, although causing a dramatic reduction in basal area and canopy cover, often leaves a high percentage of woody plants alive either as seedlings too small to be affected or as plants capable of re-sprouting from lignotubers and broken stumps. A population of woody plants equal to half or more of the original number often remains following pulling of eucalypt communities, even if all the trees over 5 m (16 ft) are uprooted completely.

=== Exotic plant species ===
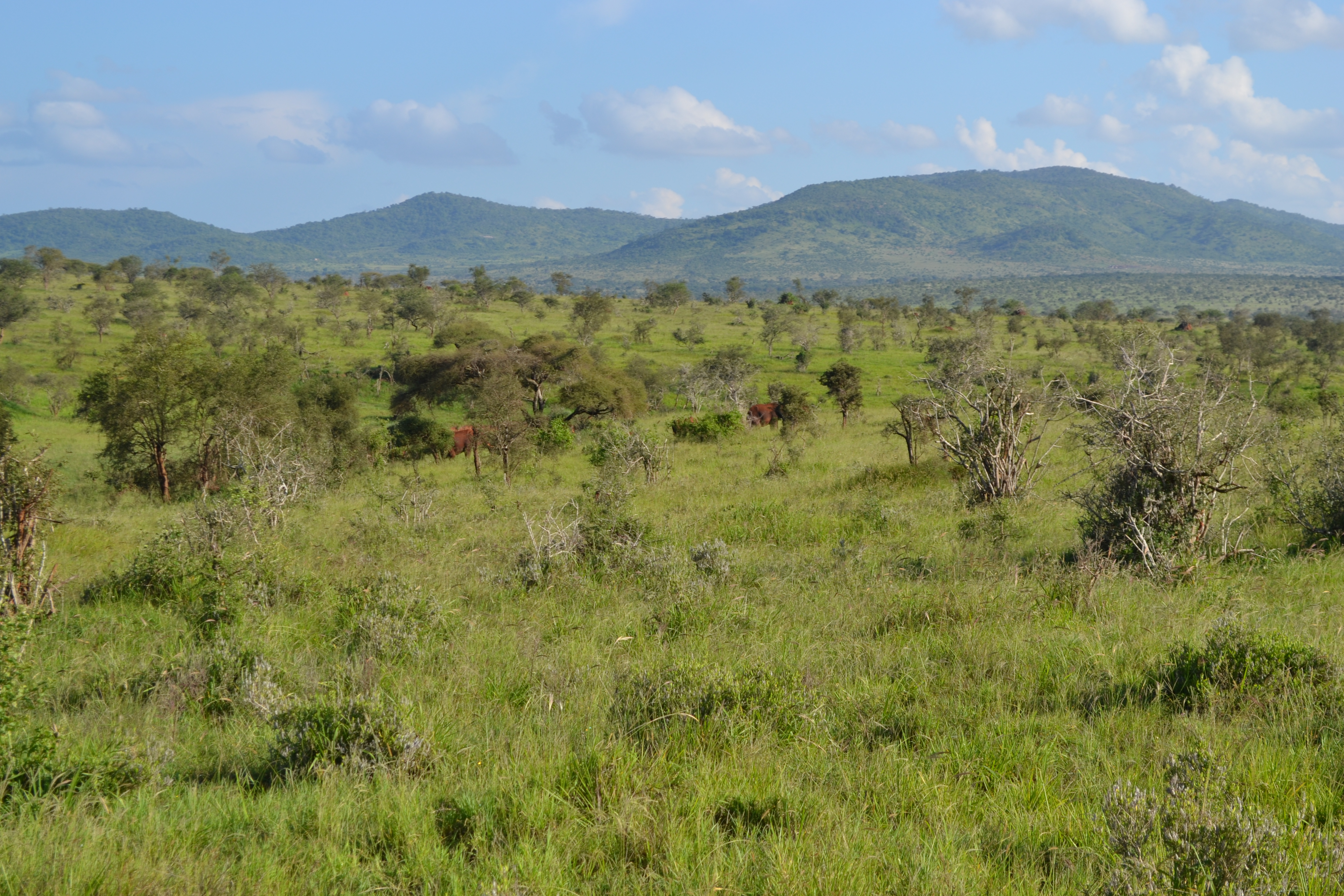
Acacia savanna, Taita Hills Wildlife Sanctuary, Kenya.

A number of exotic plants species have been introduced to savannas around the world. Amongst the woody plant species are serious environmental weeds such as prickly acacia (Acacia nilotica), Rubbervine (Cryptostegia grandiflora), Mesquite (Prosopis spp.), Lantana (Lantana camara and L. montevidensis) and Prickly Pear (Opuntia spp.). A range of herbaceous species have also been introduced to these woodlands, either deliberately or accidentally including Rhodes grass and other Chloris species, Buffel grass (Cenchrus ciliaris), Giant rat's tail grass (Sporobolus pyramidalis) parthenium (Parthenium hysterophorus) and stylos (Stylosanthes spp.) and other legumes. These introductions have the potential to significantly alter the structure and composition of savannas worldwide, and have already done so in many areas through a number of processes including altering the fire regime, increasing grazing pressure, competing with native vegetation and occupying previously vacant ecological niches. Other plant species include: white sage, spotted cactus, cotton seed, rosemary.

=== Climate change ===
Human induced climate change resulting from the greenhouse effect may result in an alteration of the structure and function of savannas. Some authors have suggested that savannas and grasslands may become even more susceptible to woody plant encroachment as a result of greenhouse induced climate change. However, a recent case described a savanna increasing its range at the expense of forest in response to climate variation, and potential exists for similar rapid, dramatic shifts in vegetation distribution as a result of global climate change, particularly at ecotones such as savannas so often represent.

== Savanna ecoregions ==
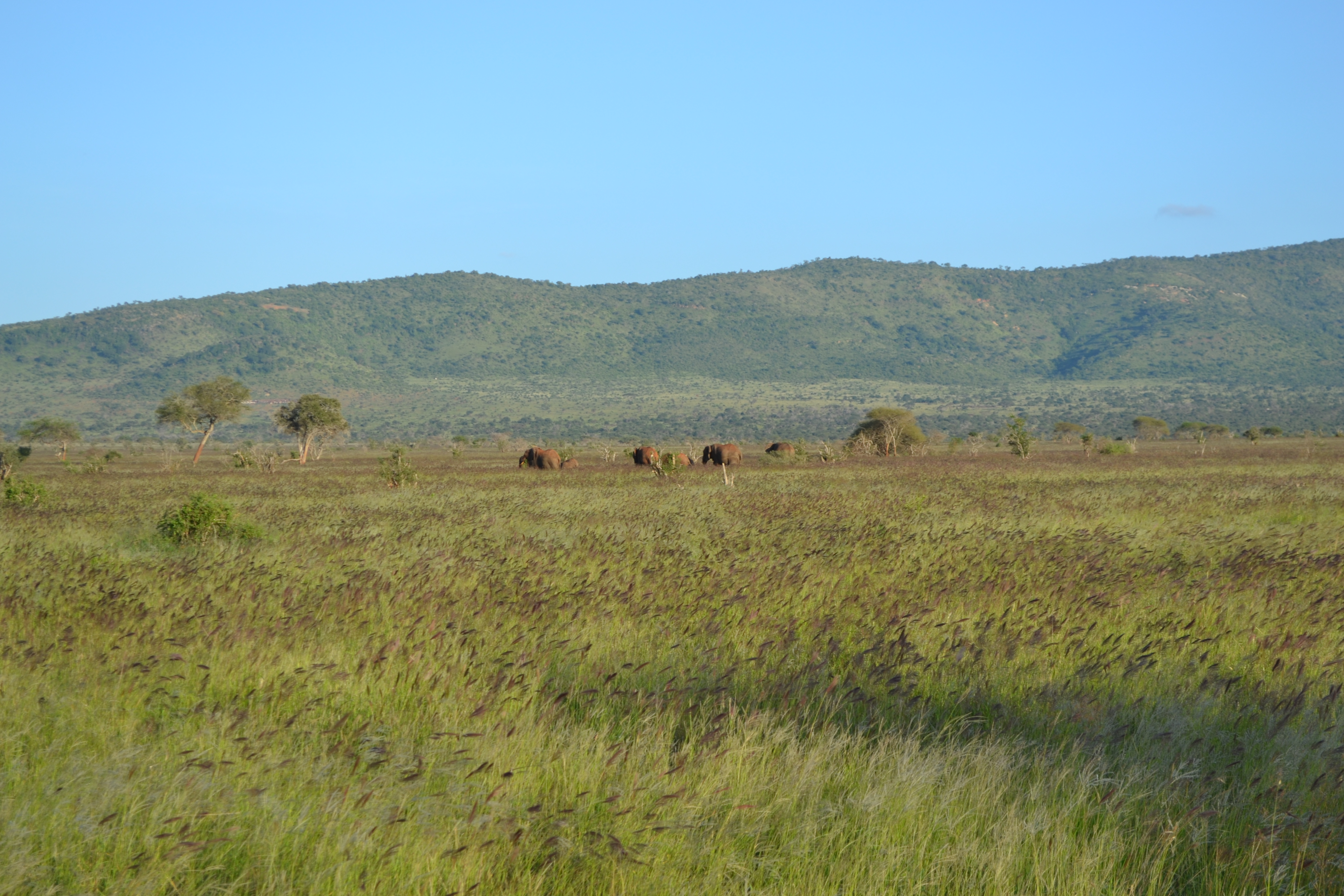
Tropical savanna in Kenya.

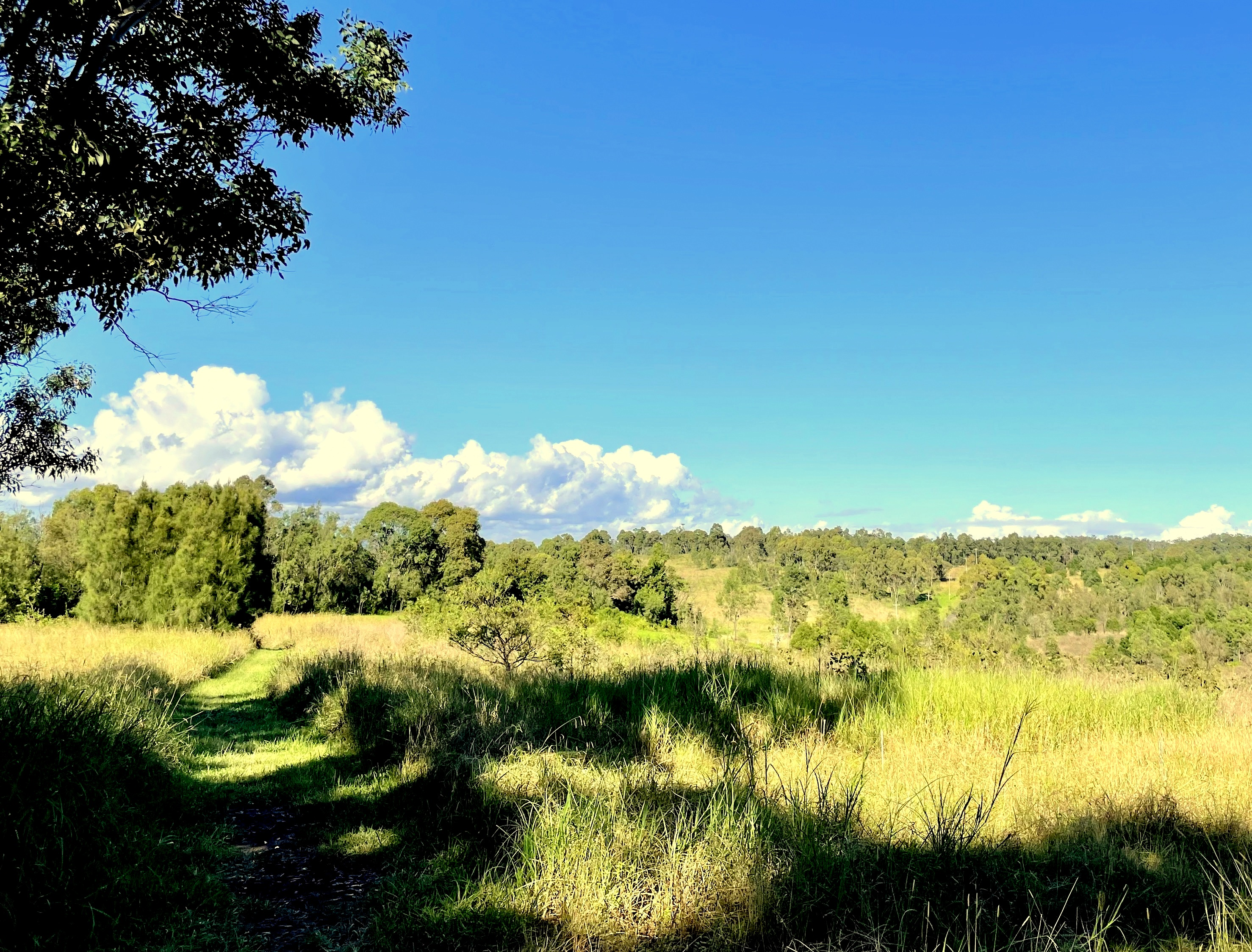
Temperate savanna in New South Wales

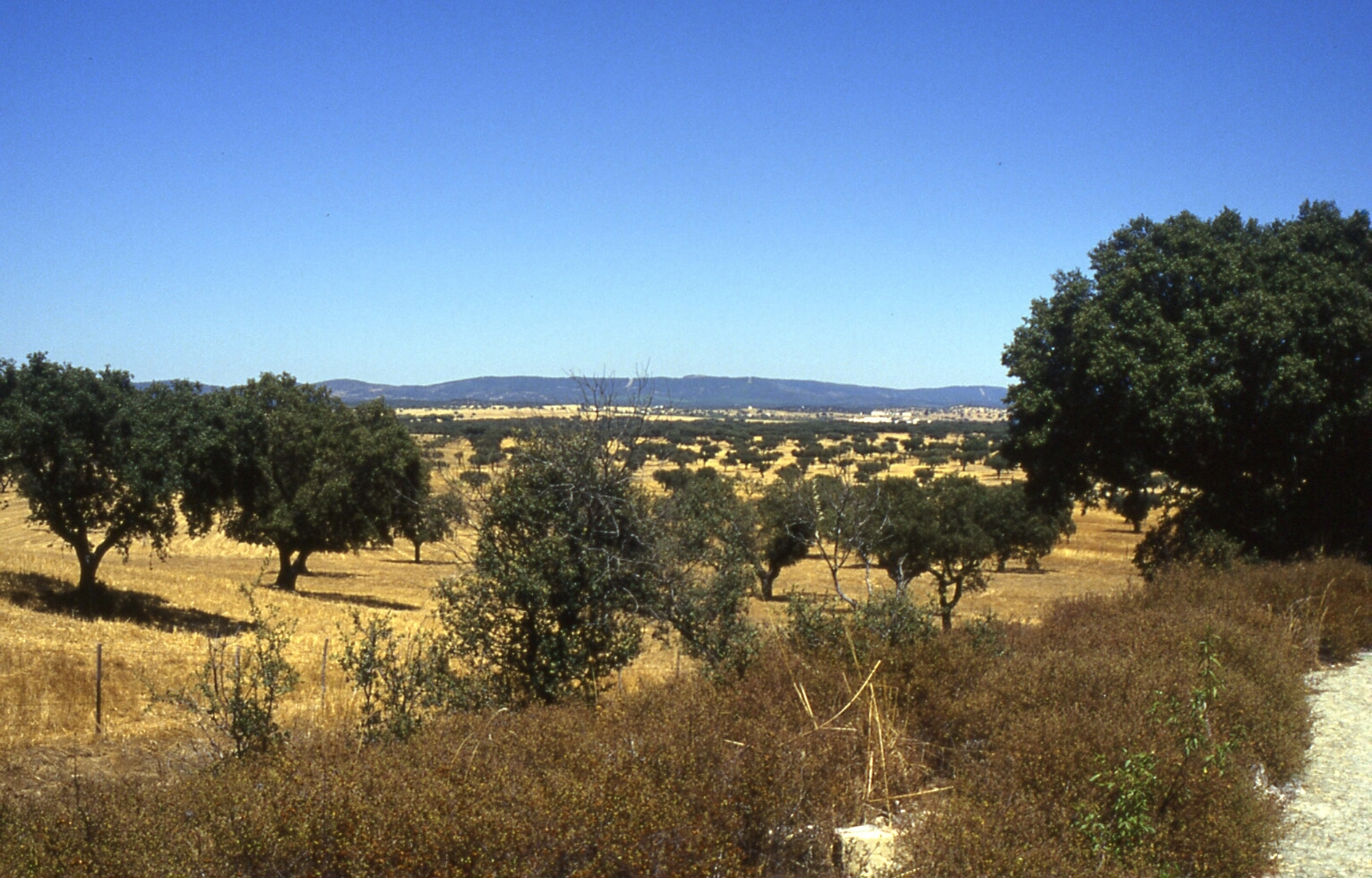
Mediterranean savanna in the Alentejo region, Portugal

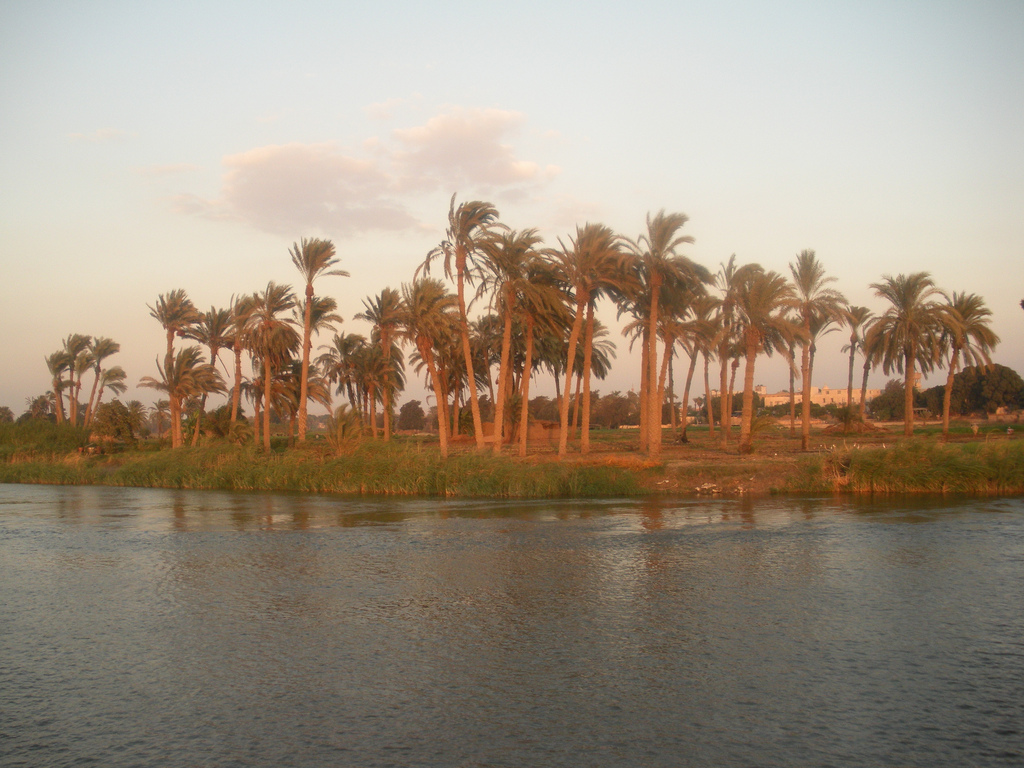
Nile Delta flooded savanna.

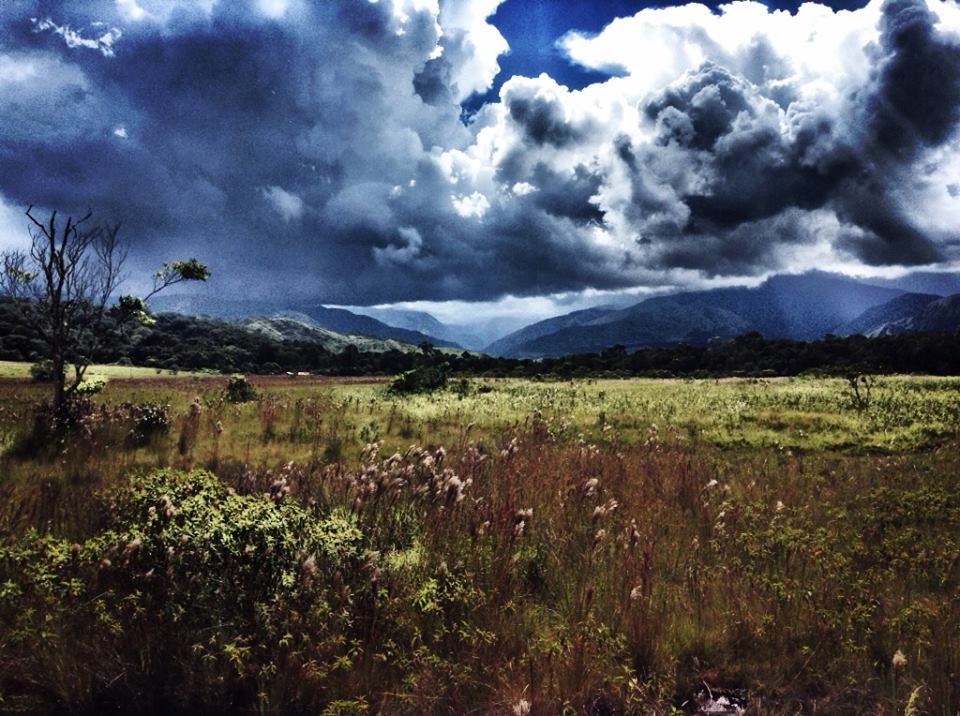
A montane savanna in the Colombian Andes

A savanna can simply be distinguished by the open savanna, where grass prevails and trees are rare; and the wooded savanna, where the trees are densest, bordering an open woodland or forest. Specific savanna ecoregions of several different types include:

- Tropical and subtropical savannas are classified with tropical and subtropical grasslands and shrublands as the tropical and subtropical grasslands, savannas, and shrublands biome. The savannas of Africa, including the Serengeti, famous for its wildlife, are typical of this type. The Brazilian savanna (Cerrado) is also included in this category, known for its exotic and varied flora. Other examples include the Kimberley tropical savanna, Central Zambezian miombo woodlands, Guinean forest–savanna mosaic, Cape York Peninsula tropical savanna, Somali Acacia–Commiphora bushlands and thickets, Southern Acacia–Commiphora bushlands and thickets, Terai–Duar savanna and grasslands and the Victoria Basin forest–savanna mosaic.
- Temperate savannas are mid-latitude savannas with wetter summers and drier winters. They are classified with temperate savannas and shrublands as the temperate grasslands, savannas, and shrublands biome, that for example cover much of the plains of southeastern Australia, northern India, Southern Africa, southeastern Argentina and Uruguay. Examples of subtropical and temperate savannas include the Southeast Australia temperate savanna, Argentine Espinal, Pampas, Cumberland Plain Woodland, Southern Cone Mesopotamian savanna, New England Peppermint Grassy Woodland and the Uruguayan savanna.
- Mediterranean savannas are mid-latitude savannas in Mediterranean climate regions, with mild, rainy winters and hot, dry summers, part of the Mediterranean forests, woodlands, and scrub biome. The oak tree savannas of California, part of the California chaparral and woodlands ecoregion, fall into this category, including the Temperate Grassland of South Australia, which features eucalyptuses. Parts of the Middle East steppe and the Eastern Mediterranean conifer–sclerophyllous–broadleaf forests may also feature savanna-like landscapes.
- Flooded savannas are savannas that are flooded seasonally or year-round. They are classified with flooded savannas as the flooded grasslands and savannas biome, which occurs mostly in the tropics and subtropics. Examples include the Everglades, Mesopotamian Marshes, Pantanal, Nile Delta flooded savanna, Lake Chad flooded savanna, Zambezian flooded grasslands, and the Sudd.
- Montane savannas are mid- to high-altitude savannas, located in a few spots around the world's high mountain regions, part of the montane grasslands and shrublands biome. The Bogotá savanna, located at an average altitude of 2,550 metres (8,370 ft) on the Altiplano Cundiboyacense, Eastern Ranges of the Andes, is an example of a montane savanna. The savannas of the Angolan Scarp savanna and woodlands ecoregion are a lower altitude example, up to 1,000 metres (3,300 ft). Other examples include the Al Hajar montane woodlands and the southern part of the Eastern Anatolian montane steppe.

== See also ==
- Rangeland
- Veld
- Grove

== Sources ==
- Bancroft, Hubert H. (1882). History of Central America. Volume 1: 1501–1530. The Works of Hubert Howe Bancroft; v. 6-8. San Francisco: A.L. Bancroft & Co. hdl:2027/uc1.$b95569. OCLC 612950729.
- Anderson, Roger C.; Fralish, James S.; Baskin, Jerry M., eds. (1999). Savannas, Barrens, and Rock Outcrop Plant Communities of North America. doi:10.1017/CBO9780511574627. ISBN 978-0-521-57322-1.
