= Nile Delta flooded savanna =

Core Ecoregion of the Nile Delta

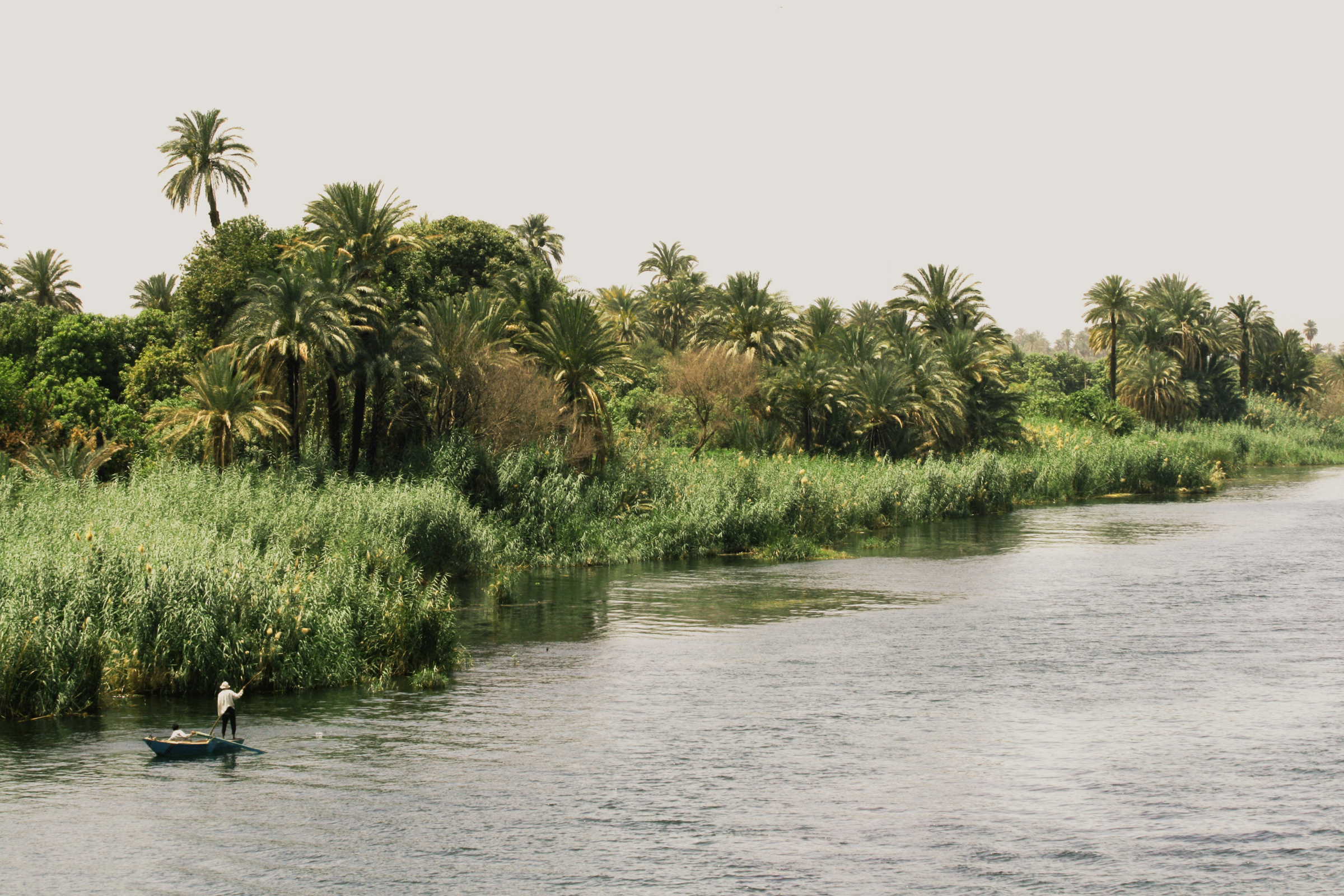
- Fishing boat on Nile between Esna and Edfu, Egypt

- Ecoregion territory (in purple)

Ecology
- Realm: Palearctic
- Biome: Flooded grasslands and savannas
- Borders: Sahara Desert; North Saharan steppe and woodlands; Mediterranean dry woodlands and steppe

Geography
- Area: 51,138 km^{2} (19,744 mi^{2})
- Country: Egypt
- Coordinates: 30.75°N 31.25°E

The Nile Delta flooded savanna, ecoregion (WWF ID: PA0904) covers both the Nile Delta proper, where the Nile River enters the Mediterranean Sea, as well as the river floodplains of the Nile 1,100 kilometres (680 mi) up-river to the Aswan Dam. Since the Aswan Dam was completed in the 1970s, the Nile on this stretch has not been subject to annual flooding, leading the loss of much of the papyrus sedge (Cyperus papyrus) swamps and other marshes along the river.

== Location and description ==
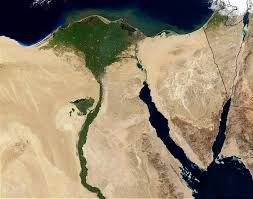
Satellite Image of Nile Delta flooded savanna region

At the northern end is the Nile Delta, 175 km long by 260 km wide. There are some lakes and lagoons with marshes near the seacoast; some of the larger are Lake Burullus and Lake Manzala. The topsoil in the delta is up to 21 meters in depth and intensely used for agriculture. The soil quality has been degrading, however, due to the loss of additional sediments from floods, and the use of fertilizers has increased. The western coast of the delta is divided from the sea by a portion of the Mediterranean dry woodlands and steppe ecoregion.

The ecoregion follows the Nile upriver over 700 km from the delta at Cairo to Aswan, averaging under 20 km wide for that length. For most of the stretch above the delta, the ecoregion is bounded on the east by the North Saharan xeric steppe and woodland ecoregion. Above the halfway point, the ecoregion on the west is the Sahara desert ecoregion.

== Climate ==
The climate of most of the river in the ecoregion is hot desert climate (Köppen climate classification (BWh)). This climate features stable air and high pressure aloft, producing a hot, arid desert. Hot-month temperatures typically average 29–35 °C (84–95 °F). Temperatures in the Delta are more Mediterranean. Precipitation averages 100-200 mm/year in the delta, with precipitation levels declining farther south.

== Flora and fauna ==
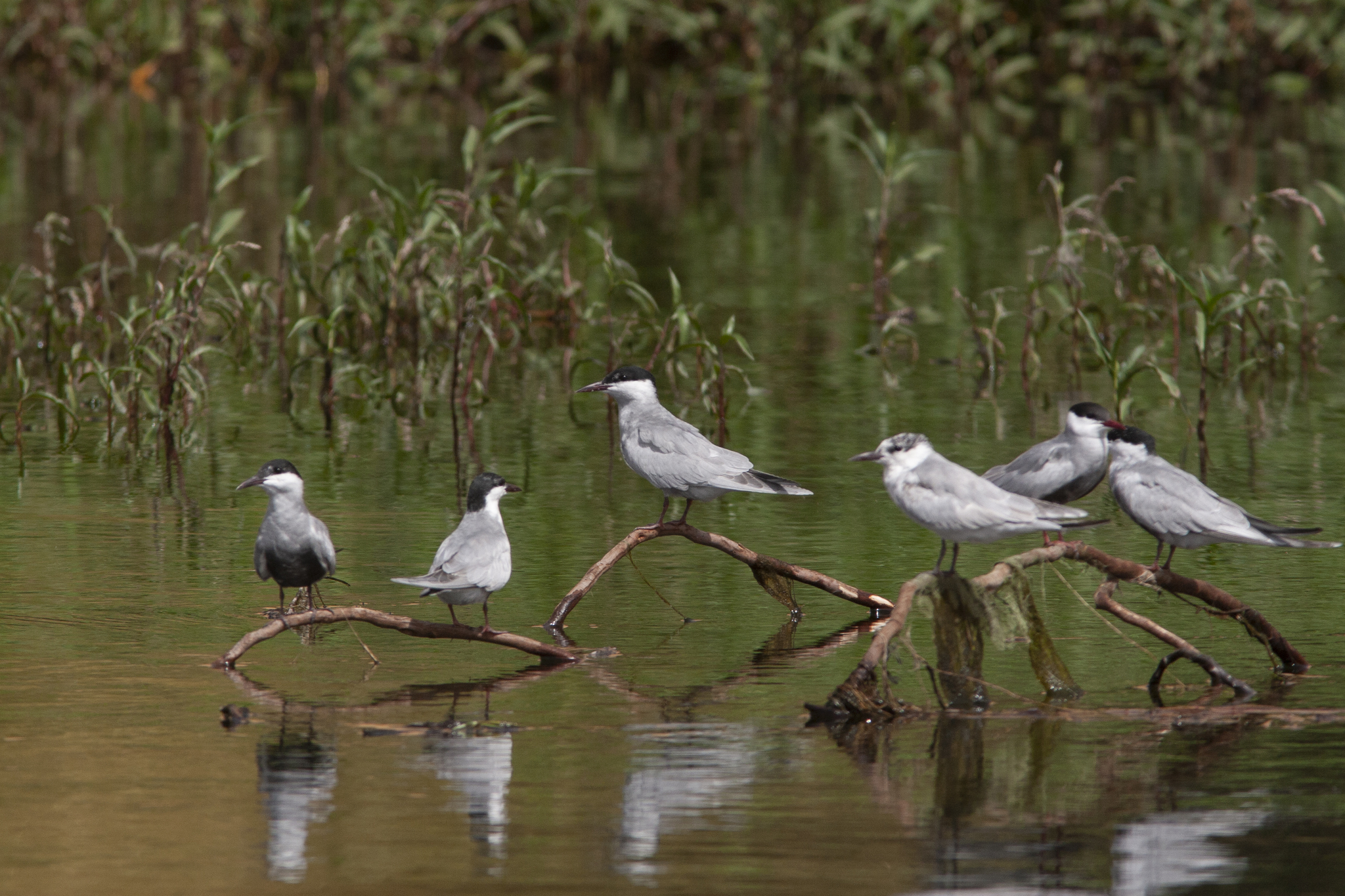
Whiskered Terns near Aswan

In the delta, the once characteristic papyrus sedge has been replaced by agricultural cultivation. Outside of the agricultural area, typical delta species are the common reed (Phragmites australis), aquatic bulrushes (Typha capensis), and sea rushes (Juncus maritimus). The coastal marshes feature drought and salt-tolerant shrubs such as Halocnemum and Nitraria retusa. Along the river upstream, the banks support dense growths of reeds (genus Phragmites) and bulrushes (genus Typha). The Nile in Egypt has 533 species of plants, eight of which are endemic.

The delta and riverine wetlands of the ecoregion are an important stopping point for migratory birds on the Asian–East African Flyway. Species include the white stork (Ciconia ciconia), black stork (Ciconia nigra), European crane (Grus grus) and the great white pelican (Pelecanus onocrotalus). Many birds winter in the delta, including the little gull (Larus minutus) and the whiskered tern (Chlidonias hybrida). Other waterbirds include the shoveler (Anas clypeata), the Eurasian teal (Anas crecca), the Eurasian wigeon (Anas penelope), the garganey (Anas querquedula), the Kentish plover (Charadrius alexandrinus), and the cormorant (Phalacrocorax carbo).

== Protected areas ==
Less than 1% of the ecoregion is officially protected. These protected areas include:

- Wadi El Assuti
