= Macrochloa =

Scientific classification
- Kingdom: Plantae
- Clade: Tracheophytes
- Clade: Angiosperms
- Clade: Monocots
- Clade: Commelinids
- Order: Poales
- Family: Poaceae
- Subfamily: Pooideae
- Supertribe: Stipodae
- Tribe: Stipeae
- Genus: Macrochloa; Kunth

Genus of plants

Macrochloa is a genus of flowering plants belonging to the family Poaceae.

Its native range is Western and Central Mediterranean.

Species:

- Macrochloa antiatlantica (Barreña, D.Rivera, Alcaraz & Obón) H.Scholz & Valdés
- Macrochloa tenacissima (L.) Kunth
