= Esparto =

Fibre produced from perennial grasses

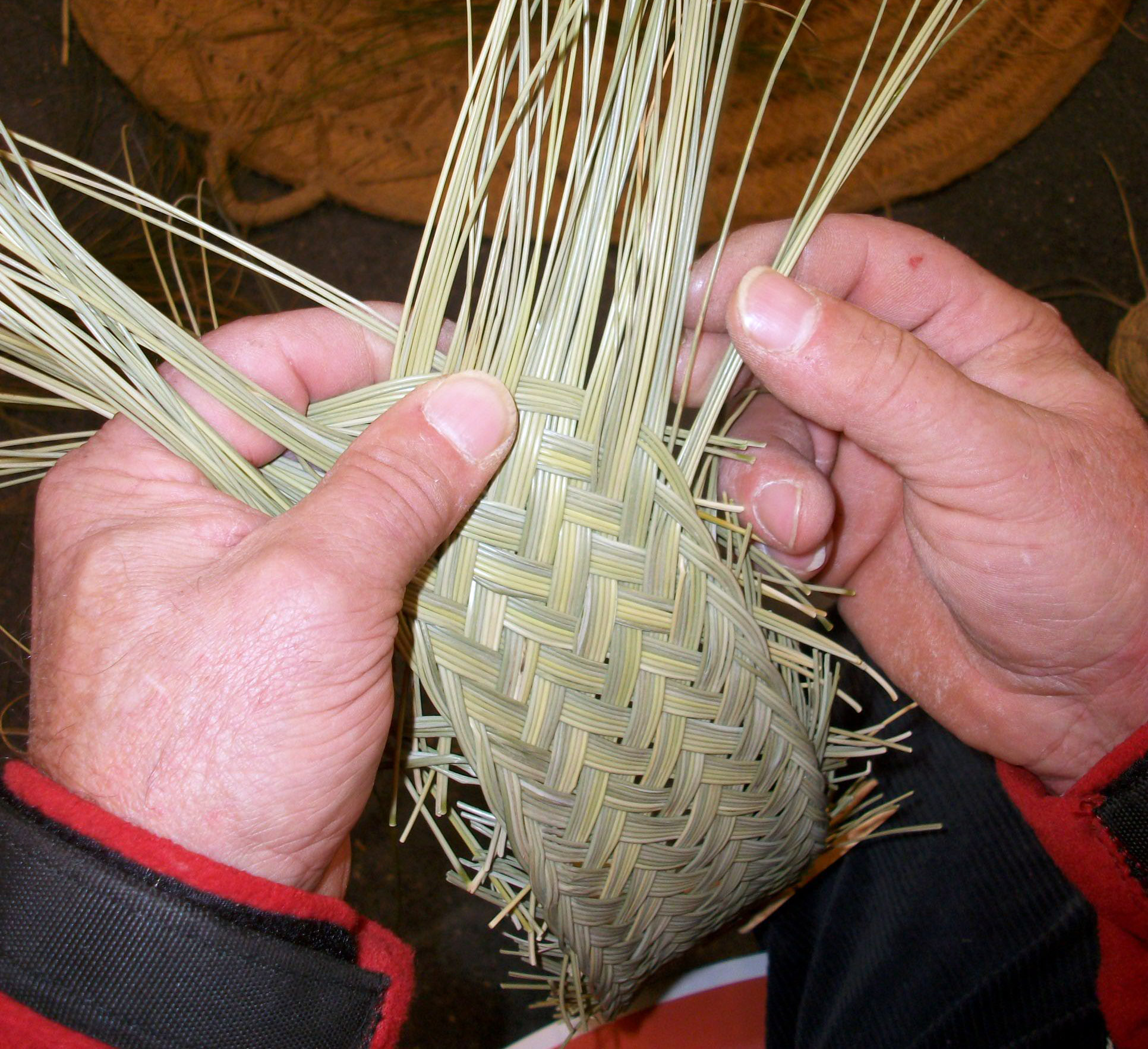
Weaving a strip of plaited esparto

Esparto, halfah grass, or esparto grass is a fibre produced from two species of perennial grasses of north Africa, Spain and Portugal. It is used for crafts, such as basketry, espadrilles and cords. Macrochloa tenacissima and Lygeum spartum are the species used to produce esparto. "Esparto" or σπάρτο in Greek may also refer to any woven products of sedge or broom, including cords and ropes.

Macrochloa tenacissima produces the better and stronger esparto. It is endemic to the Mediterranean region, growing in Portugal, Spain, Morocco, Algeria, Tunisia, and Libya. Another name in Spanish for the plant is "atocha", a pre-Roman word. This species grows forming a steppic landscape – esparto grasslands – which covers large parts of Spain and Algeria.

Lygeum spartum has a broadly similar distribution, though also occurs further east, growing in Morocco, Western Sahara, Algeria, Tunisia, Spain, Italy, southern Greece (Crete), Libya, Egypt, and Israel.

== History ==
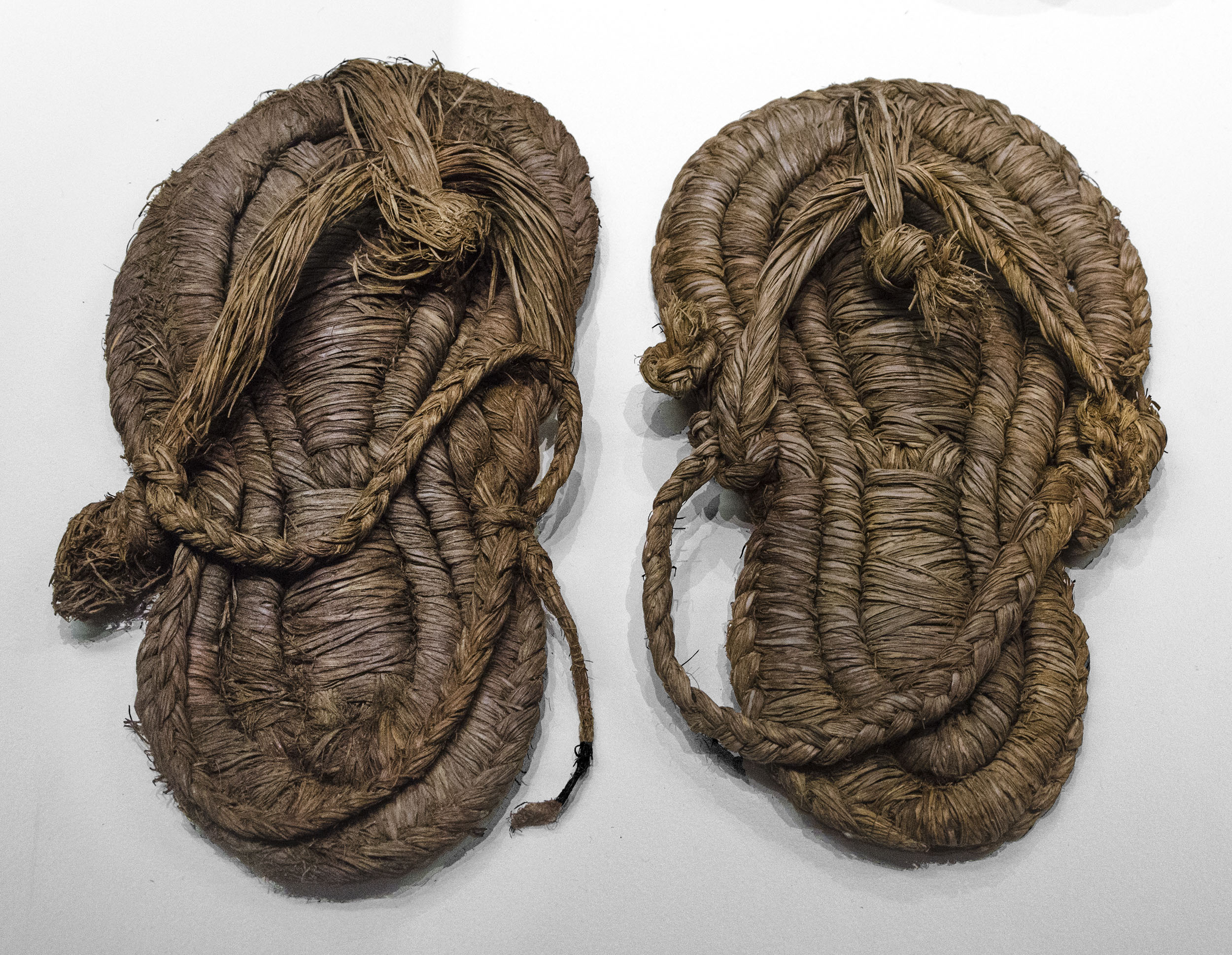
Esparto sandals discovered in Spain dating to c. 5000 BC

Esparto leaves have been used for millennia. The oldest baskets of esparto, dating back 7,000 years, were found in a cave in southern Spain (Cueva de los Murciélagos, Albuñol, Granada). This collection is now in the National Archaeological Museum of Spain. There are many esparto remains in archaeological settlements from as long ago as the Neolithic period, including rugs, ropes, clothes, etc. Iberians used esparto rugs as floor coverings. For Greeks, Phoenicians and Romans, esparto was the best raw material for boat ropes. For centuries, esparto grasslands have been managed by local populations in order to boost the harvest, due to its economic value. In southern Spain there is an "Esparto culture": a deep knowledge about the many uses of this fibre forms part of the traditions of these communities. After the Spanish Civil War (1936–1939), esparto was declared a "national fibre"; there was even a National Esparto Service. The opening of markets to other fibres and plastics eventually led to the decline of the esparto industry.

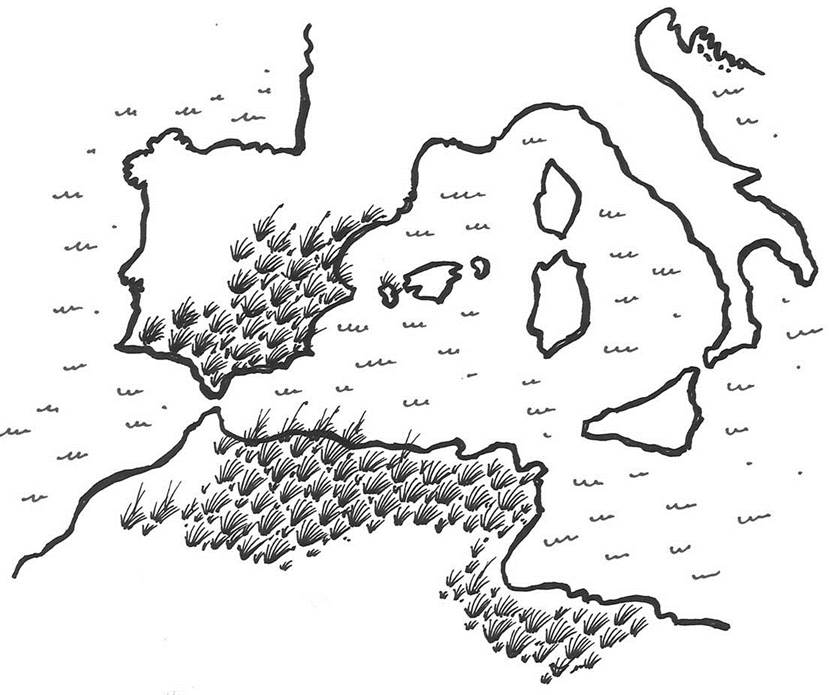
Distribution area of esparto grass (Macrochloa tenacissima)

== Application ==
Esparto leaves are traditionally harvested with a stick; usually of wood or iron, but in ancient times, of bone. The stick is used to pull up a handful of leaves at a time. The esparto is not normally used immediately after harvesting; instead, the leaves are left to dry in the sun until they turn yellowish. This is the raw esparto, which is used for different basketry techniques. An alternative is retting, soaking the leaves in water for about a month, before drying and then crushing them. This material is known as "crushed esparto", which is stronger and easier to weave. The main techniques are:

- Plaited esparto: people weave a long strip of raw esparto or crushed esparto. The artifact is made by sewing this strip in different ways. Every kind of plait has a different name. Examples (in Spanish) include the "pleita" (with raw esparto) and the "recincho" (with crushed esparto), but there is a rich Spanish vocabulary for the techniques and artifacts of the esparto craft. In many cases, different terms are used in different regions. Mainly, this vocabulary belongs to the Castilian and Catalan dialects of Valencia.

All techniques involve working with an odd number of strands, from 5 to 31 or more.

- Coiled esparto: sewing many esparto leaves into a spiral, every turn over the former one.
- Twinning esparto: similar to wicker basketry.
- Cofin braiding: a typical stitch to make cofines, a shallow basket used formerly in the olive oil mills to press the olive mass
- Snail basket stitch: this is a special stitch to make snail baskets, a specific basket to pick snails.
- Espadrilles: the former peasant footwear of southern Spain. These are made with crushed esparto.

There are many complementary techniques to end the baskets, square braids, cord edging, crown sinnet, points, etc. In the finest pieces, all leaves used must be the same size and diameter, and must always be joined in parallel.

Traditionally, esparto basketry has not been a professional product. Shepherds, farmers and other people of the countryside used to plait esparto on rainy days or in times not suitable for working.

Most craft tools and artifacts in the southern Spanish countryside for farming and livestock were made with esparto, such as harvesting baskets, items for the home, and containers/sacks for carts, horses, and donkeys. There is a huge variety of items, many of which are well known and have a specific use, but others are the product of a special personal need or a free creation, such as toys for children or animals. Every kind of basket has a special name that describes its use. For example, a "cesto rosero" is a basket used traditionally to gather saffron flowers.

A special esparto basketry piece is the esparto canteen. Made with crushed esparto and waterproofed with pine pitch, they were used by the shepherds of southeastern Spain to carry water in the mountains. The Archaeological Museum of Cartagena has an example of a Roman esparto canteen two thousand years old. Esparto was also used for making rock slings, most notably by Balearic slingers. In ancient times these were used as weapons of war, but could also be used for hunting or by shepherds to protect their livestock.

A wide strip of plaited raw esparto, named "pleita" in Spanish, is the traditional mould for Manchego cheese.

Another important use of esparto is in rope-making. Ropes could be made with raw esparto, crushed esparto or raked esparto (after crushed). A special rope was used to tie cereal bunches in harvest time. Other were used in vernacular architecture to tie reeds to the timber in roof building.

== Paper ==
Esparto grass is known for its use in papermaking. The fibre makes a high quality paper often used in book manufacturing. First used in Great Britain in 1850 by Thomas Routledge who imported it from southern Spain, and it was greatly exploited by Edward Lloyd at his paper mills at Bow-Bridge and Sittingbourne from the 1860s. Lloyd imported his raw materials from Oran and Arzew in Algeria. It has been extensively used in the UK and Europe, but due to transportation costs, it is rarely found in the United States. Most paper made from esparto is usually combined with 5% to 10% wood pulp.

The fibres are fairly short in relation to their width, yet do not create any significant amount of dust. Because of the short fibre length, the tensile strength of the paper is less than that of many other papers, but its resistance to shrinking and stretching is superior, and it is a well-filled, dense paper with excellent inking qualities. It also has very good folding properties.

Some manufacturers of rolling paper may use esparto, which might lead to a slightly higher carcinogen level when burned.

== Other uses ==
The old leaves, which are under the plant, were used to make the traditional torches of southern Spain, named "hachos". They are also used by beekeepers to produce smoke while taking honey from the hives. Shepherds would sometimes weave a makeshift spoon from esparto leaves to eat curdle.

Dried esparto leaves were used in the construction of slings by Balearic slingers from the mid-4th century BCE onwards, after processing into long fibres.

== Gallery ==
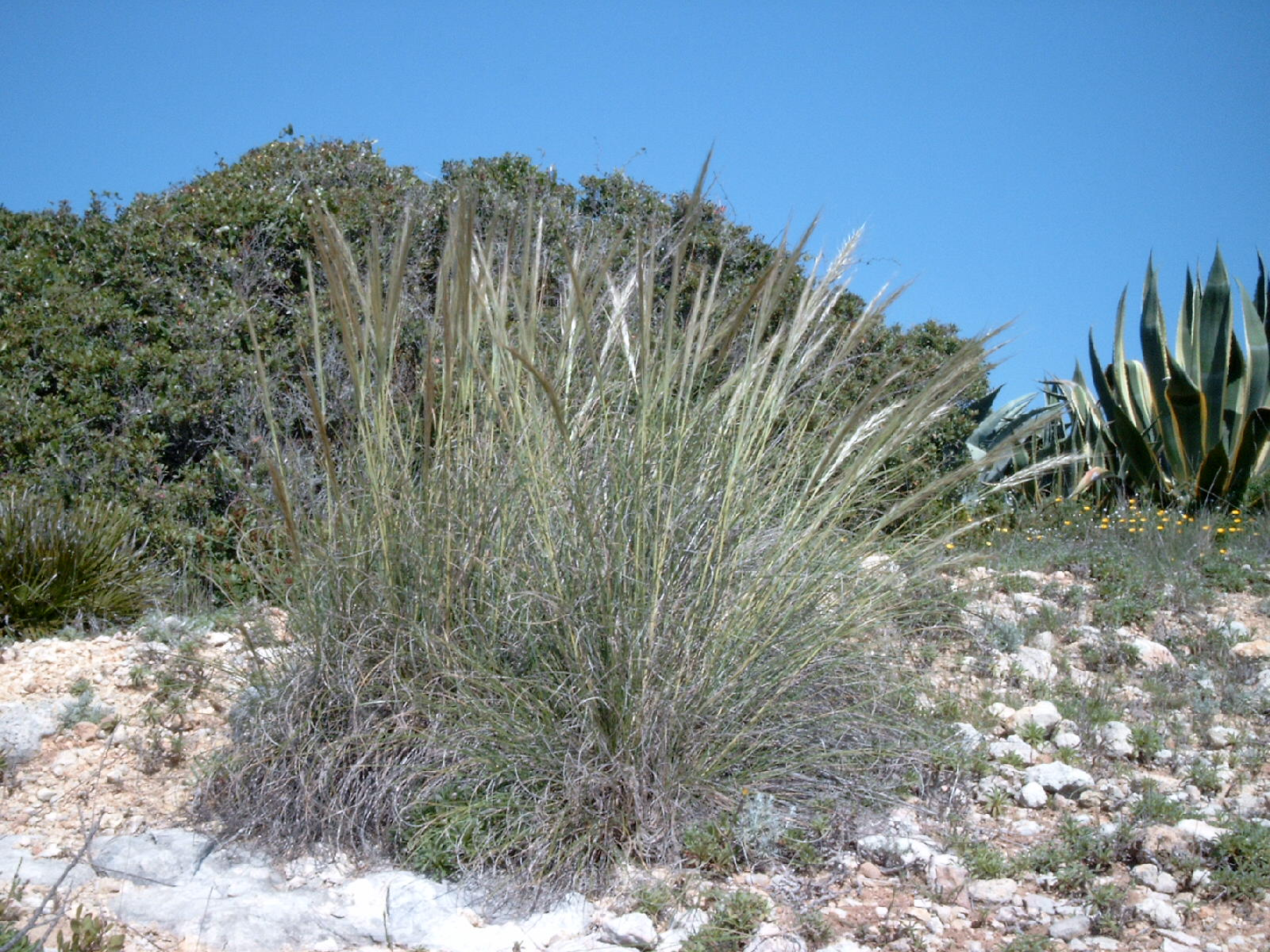
Macrochloa tenacissima

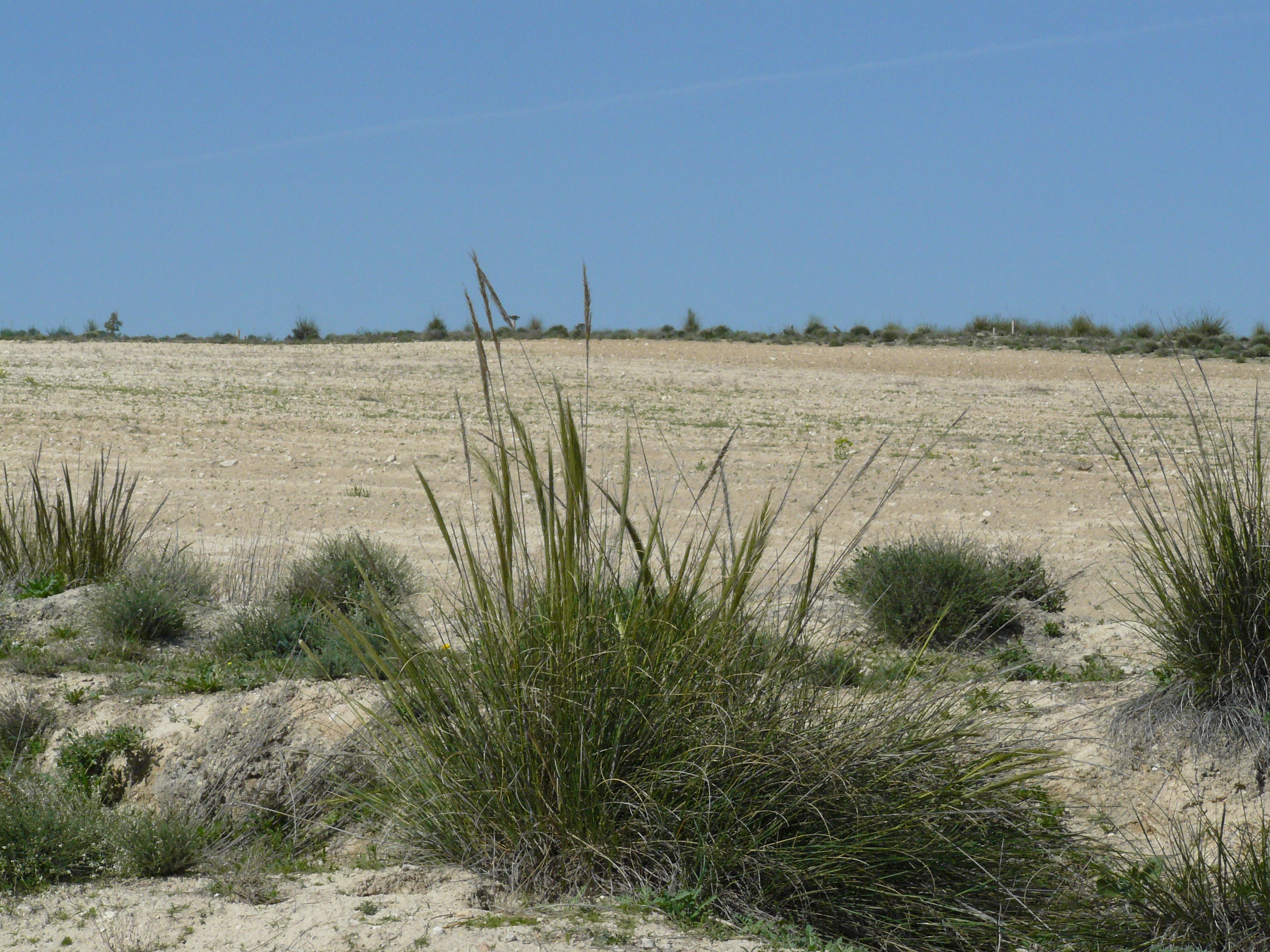
In habitat

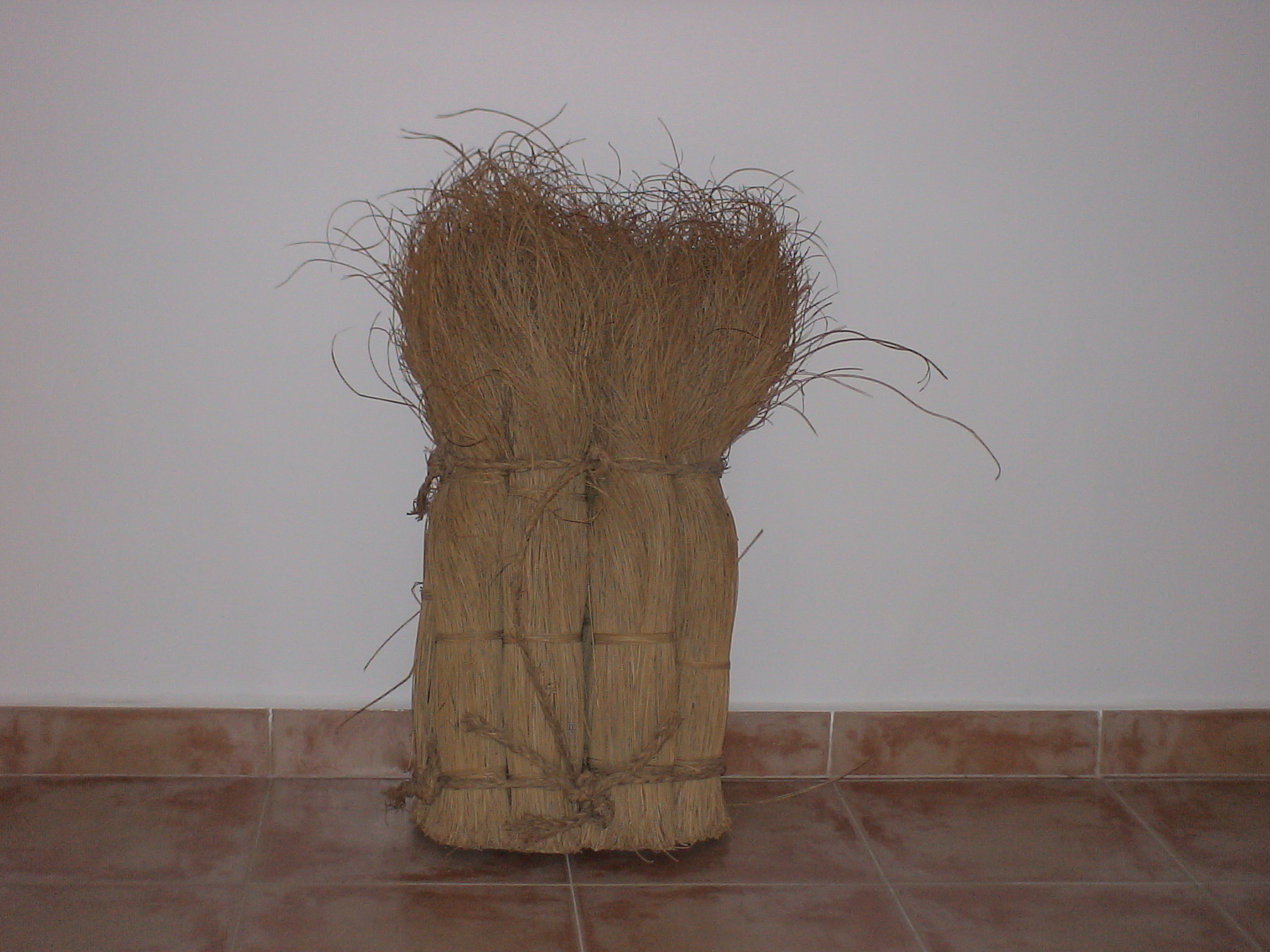
A bale of esparto

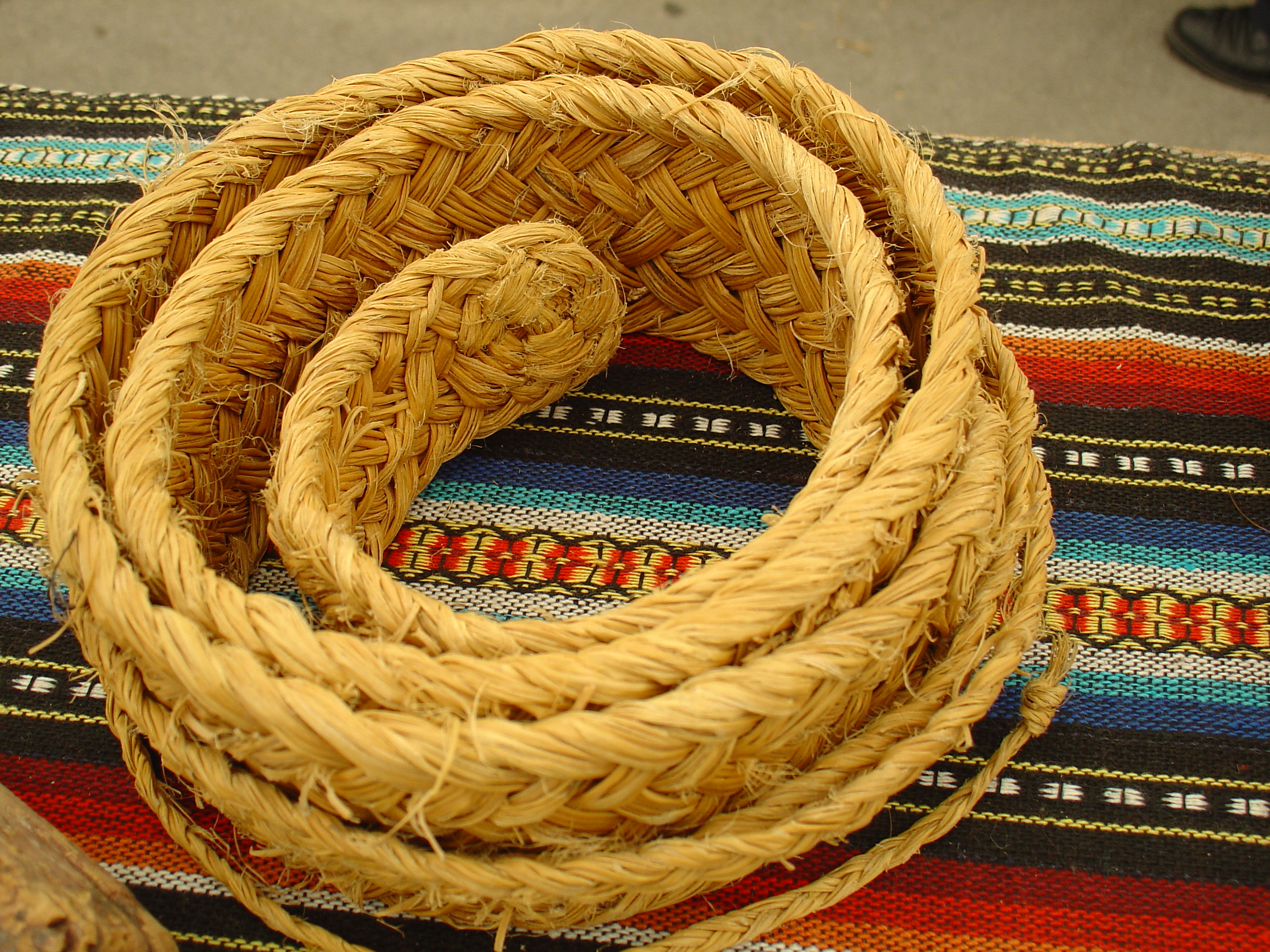
Woven esparto

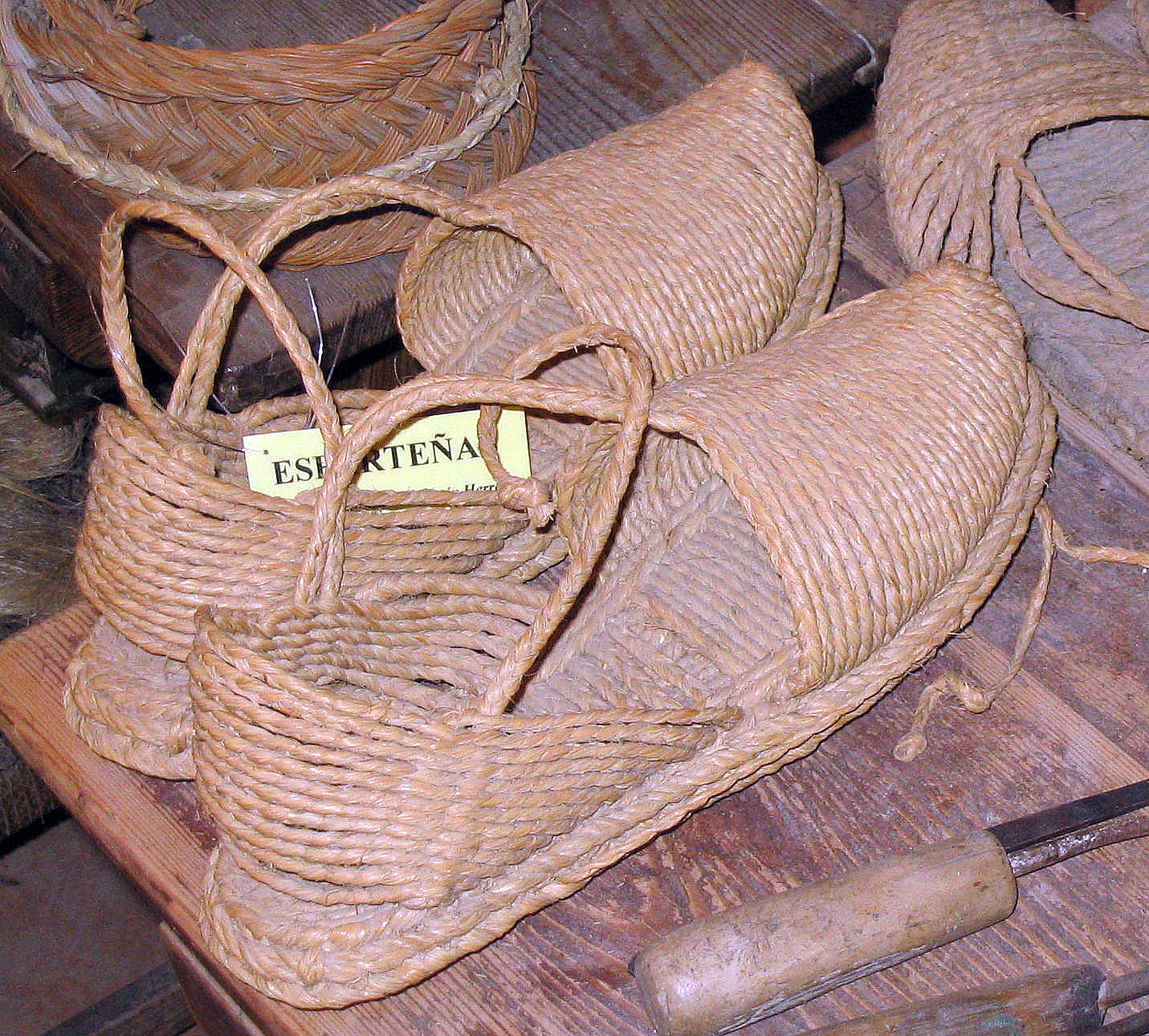
Esparto espadrilles

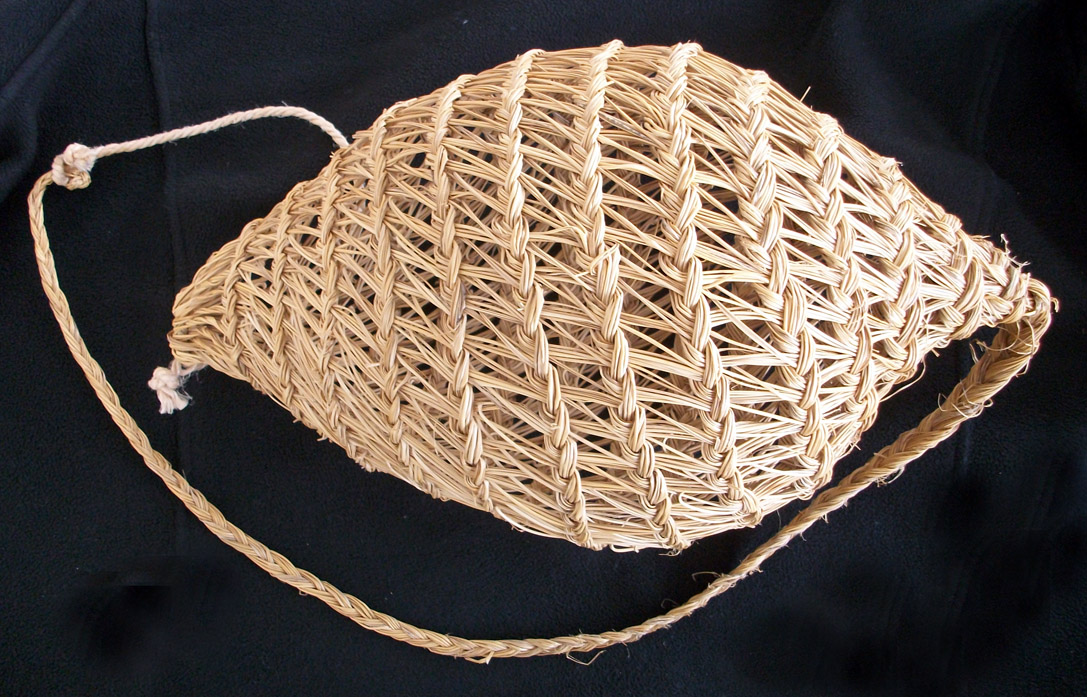
Basket to pick snails

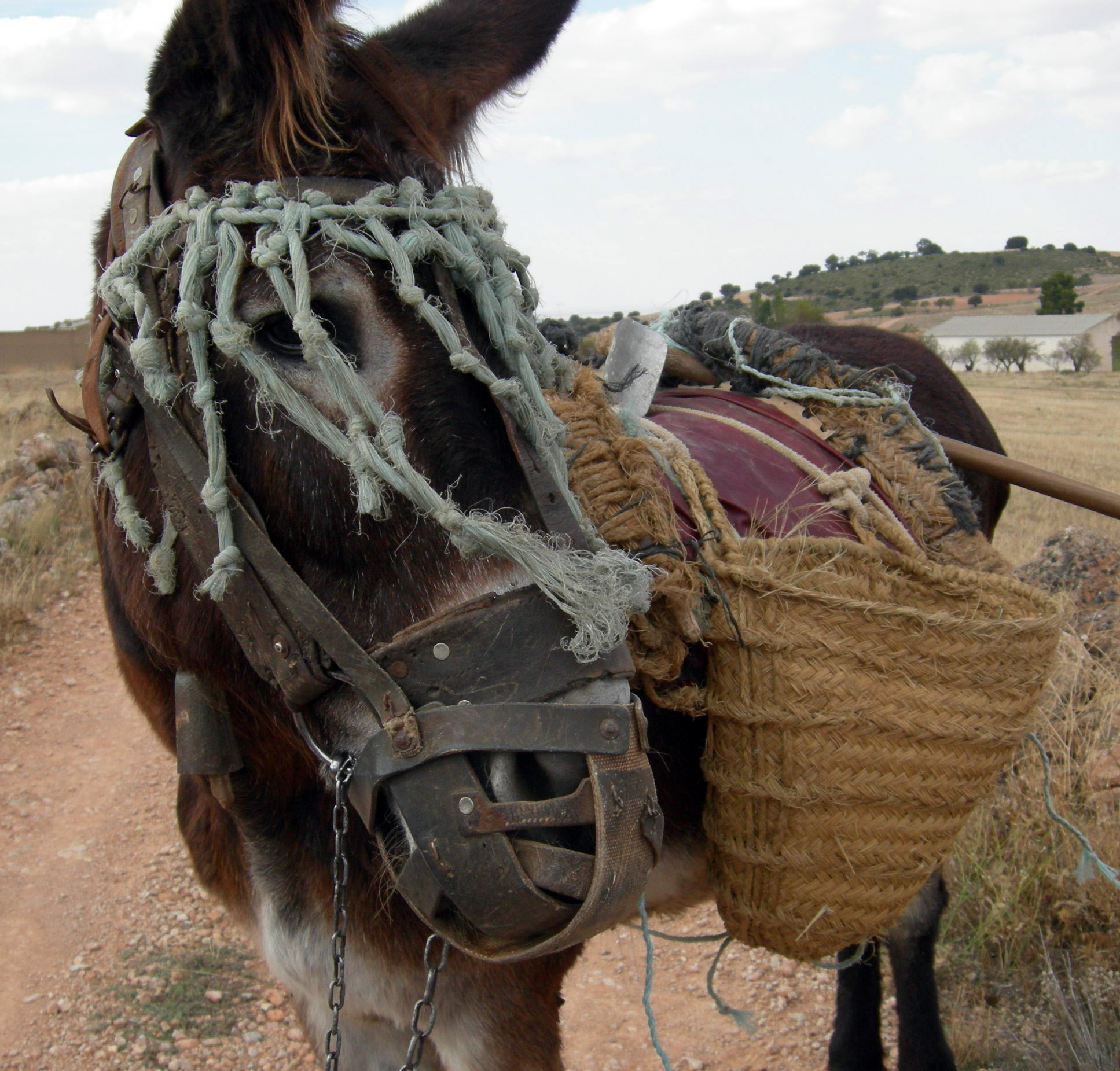
A donkey with traditional esparto panniers

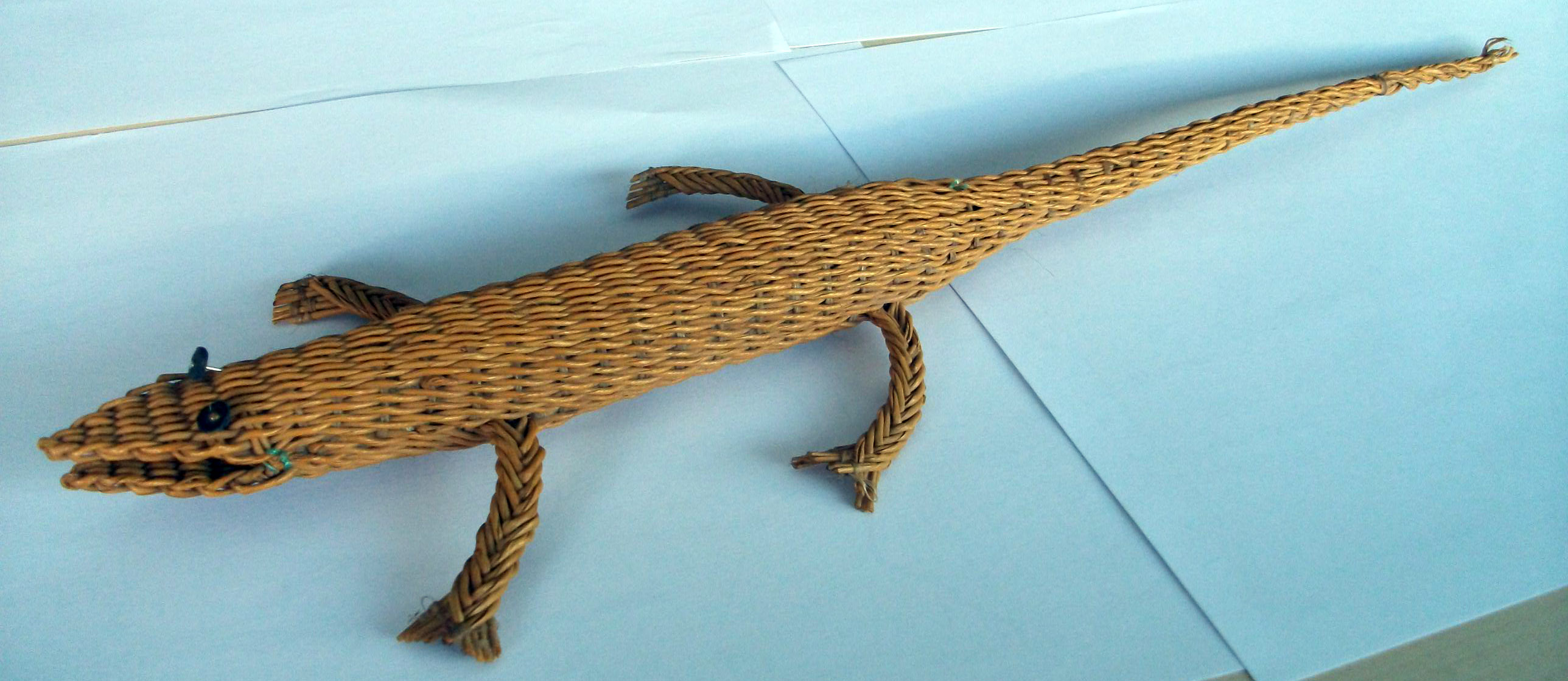
Esparto lizard

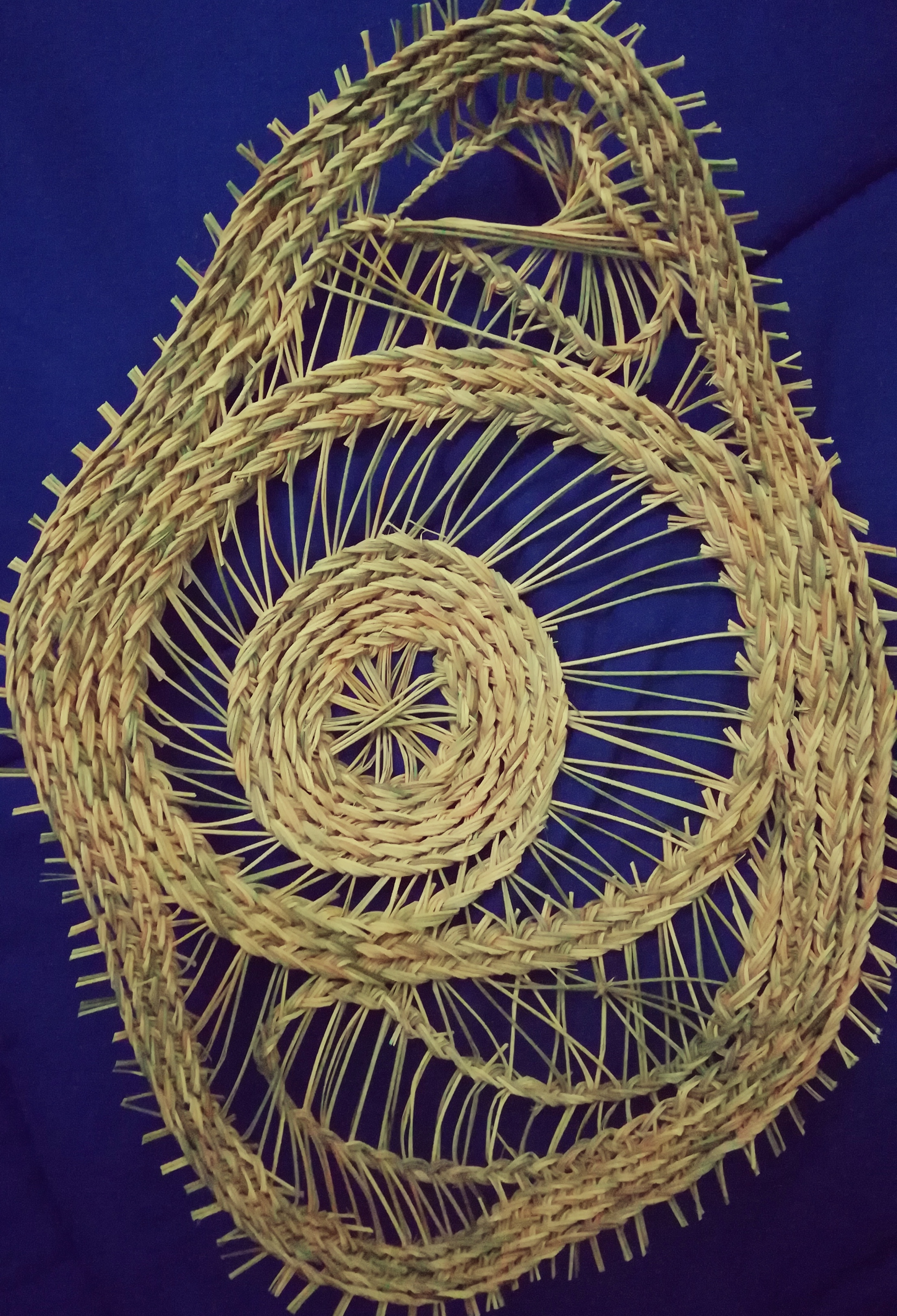
Cofín

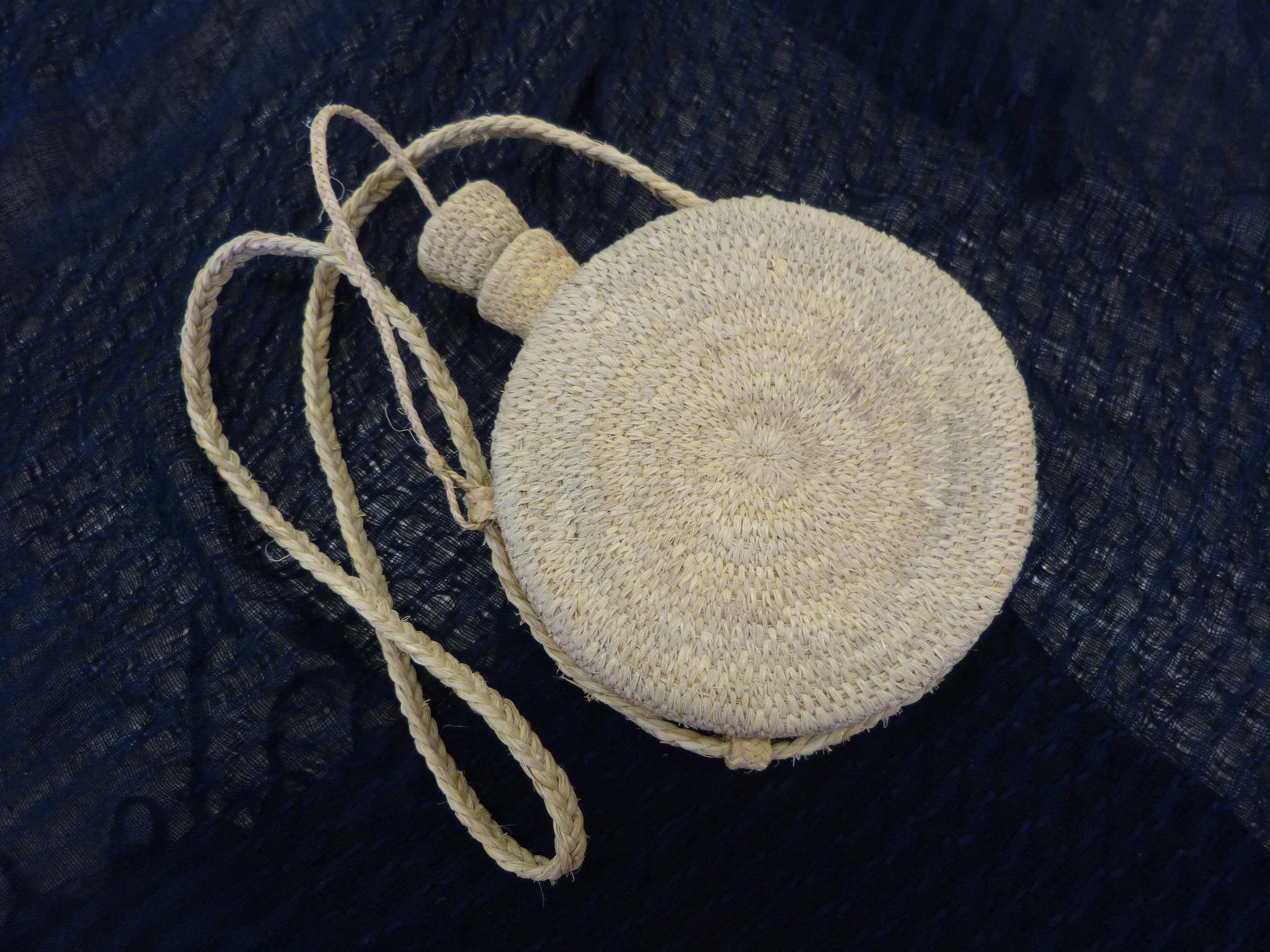
Esparto canteen

== Sources ==
- Pardo de Santayana, M., Morales, R., Aceituno, L. y Molina, M. 2014. Inventario Español de los Conocimientos Tradicionales relativos a la Biodiversidad. Ministerio de Agricultura, Alimentación y Medio Ambiente
