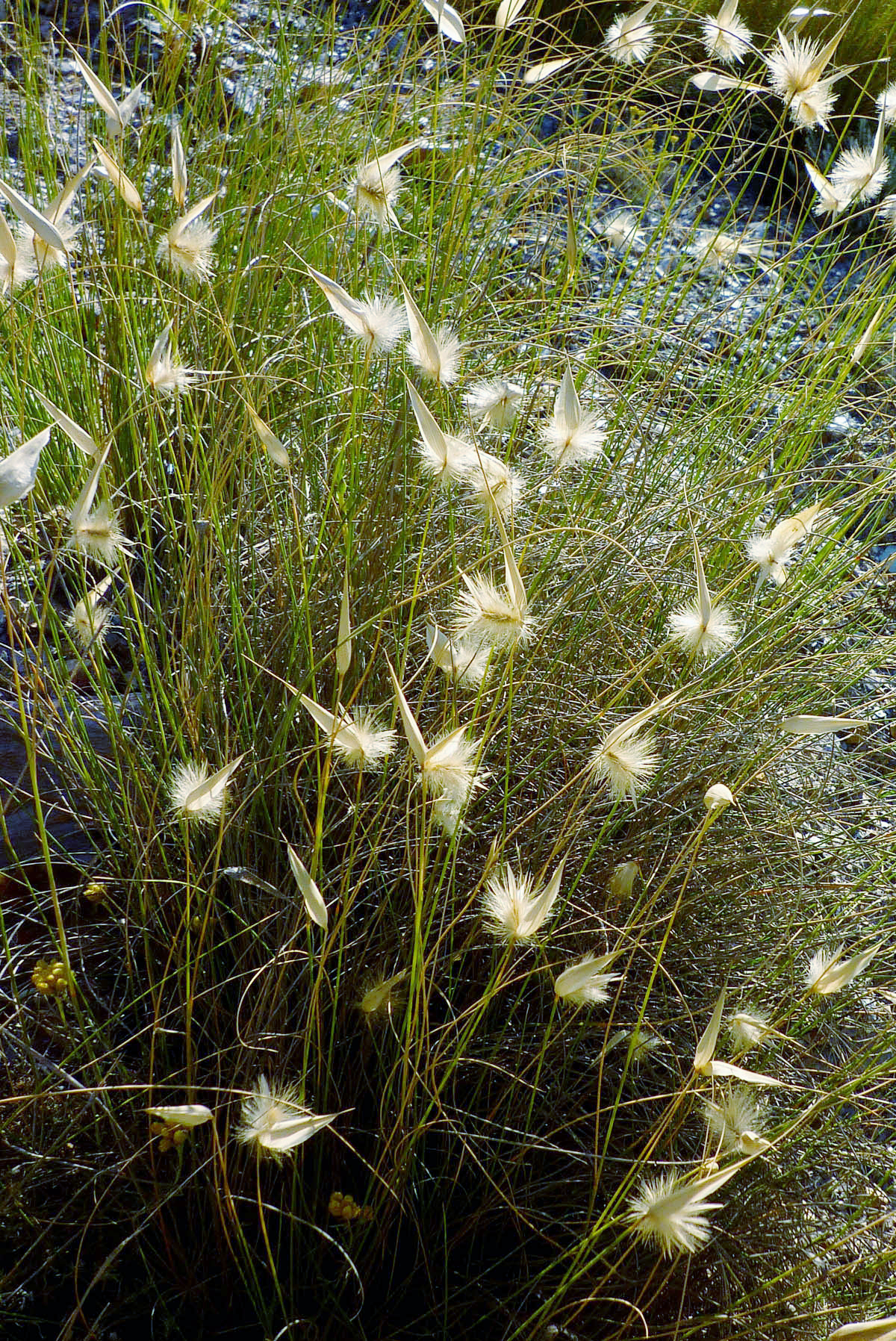
- Lygeum spartum

Scientific classification
- Kingdom: Plantae
- Clade: Embryophytes
- Clade: Tracheophytes
- Clade: Spermatophytes
- Clade: Angiosperms
- Clade: Monocots
- Clade: Commelinids
- Order: Poales
- Family: Poaceae
- Clade: BOP clade
- Subfamily: Pooideae
- Supertribe: Nardodae
- Tribe: Lygeeae; J.Presl
- Genus: Lygeum; Loefl. ex L.
- Species: L. spartum

Binomial name
- Lygeum spartum Loefl. ex L.

Synonyms
- Linosparton Adans.; Sparthum Plin. ex P. Beauv. as synonym; Spartum Plin. ex P. Beauv., alternate spelling; Lygeum tenax Salisb.; Lygeum spathaceum Lam.; Lygeum apiculatum Gand.; Lygeum insulare Gand.; Lygeum loscosii Gand.; Lygeum murcicum Gand.; Lygeum spartum f. longispathum Trab.

= Lygeum =

Species of plant

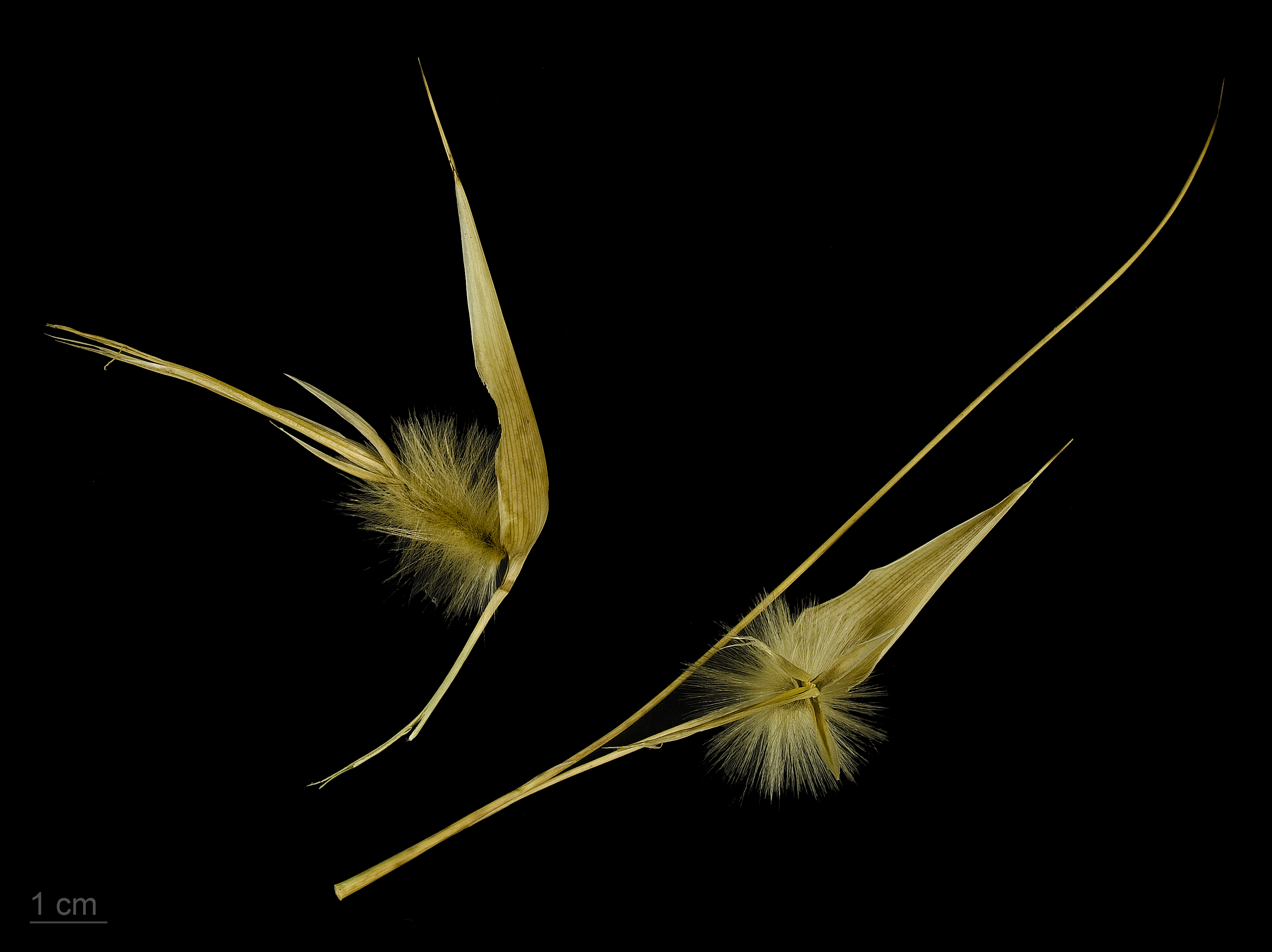
Lygeum spartum MHNT

Lygeum is a genus of Mediterranean plants in the grass family. It is placed in its own tribe Lygeeae, which is sister to Nardeae.

The only known species is Lygeum spartum, commonly called esparto grass, cord grass or albardine, which is distributed in arid areas around the Mediterranean Sea. It is similar in appearance to Macrochloa tenacissima and both species are used to produce a fibre product known as esparto or esparto grass.

== Description ==
Lygeum spartum is a rhizomatous hermaphroditic, perennial grass growing up to 75 centimetres (30 in) tall. The rhizome and the base of the stem are scaly. The leaves are threadlike but stiff and tough, measuring up to 50 centimetres (20 in) long. The inflorescence is made up of a few long-haired spikelets each up to 4.5 centimetres (1 3/4 in) long. They are wrapped in a lance-shaped bract called a spatheole. This sheath is 3 to 9 centimetres (1 1/6 to 3 7/12 in) long and can have a sharp point.

== Distribution ==
Lygeum spartinum is native to southern Europe and North Africa, where its distribution includes Crete, Italy, Spain, Algeria, Egypt, Libya, Morocco, and Tunisia. It may have been introduced to Kashmir.

== Habitat ==
Rocky sea shores, or on dry sandy or clay and often calcareous soil.

== Uses ==
Lygeum spartum fibres have high tensile strength and flexibility, and is used for making ropes, sandals, baskets, mats and other durable articles. They have also used in the manufacture of high quality paper. It can also be used locally as a fodder for livestock and to stabilise sand dunes and rehabilitate salt soils, due to its tolerance of saline conditions.
