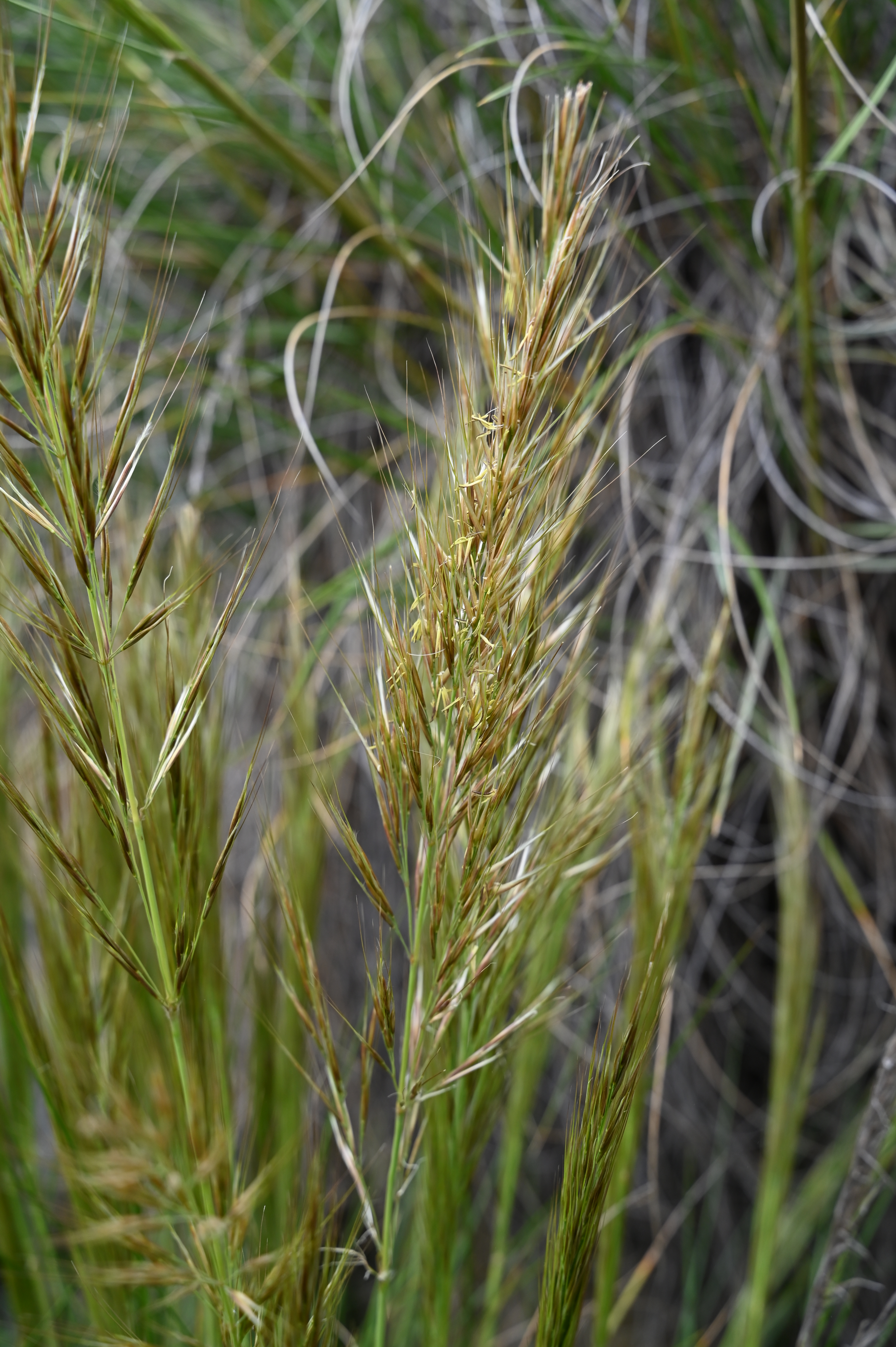
- Flowerhead

Conservation status
- Vulnerable (IUCN 3.1)

Scientific classification
- Kingdom: Plantae
- Clade: Embryophytes
- Clade: Tracheophytes
- Clade: Spermatophytes
- Clade: Angiosperms
- Clade: Monocots
- Clade: Commelinids
- Order: Poales
- Family: Poaceae
- Subfamily: Pooideae
- Genus: Macrochloa
- Species: M. tenacissima

Binomial name
- Macrochloa tenacissima (L.) Kunth

Synonyms
- Lasiagrostis tenacissima (L.) Trin. & Rupr.; Stipa tenacissima L.

= Macrochloa tenacissima =

Species of grass

Macrochloa tenacissima, synonym Stipa tenacissima, (esparto, esparto grass, halfah grass, alfa grass, or needle grass) is a perennial grass of northwestern Africa and the southern part of the Iberian Peninsula. Phylogenetic and morphological evidence indicated that the species did not belong in Stipa, and recent sources treat the species as Macrochloa tenacissima as a result.

== Distribution ==
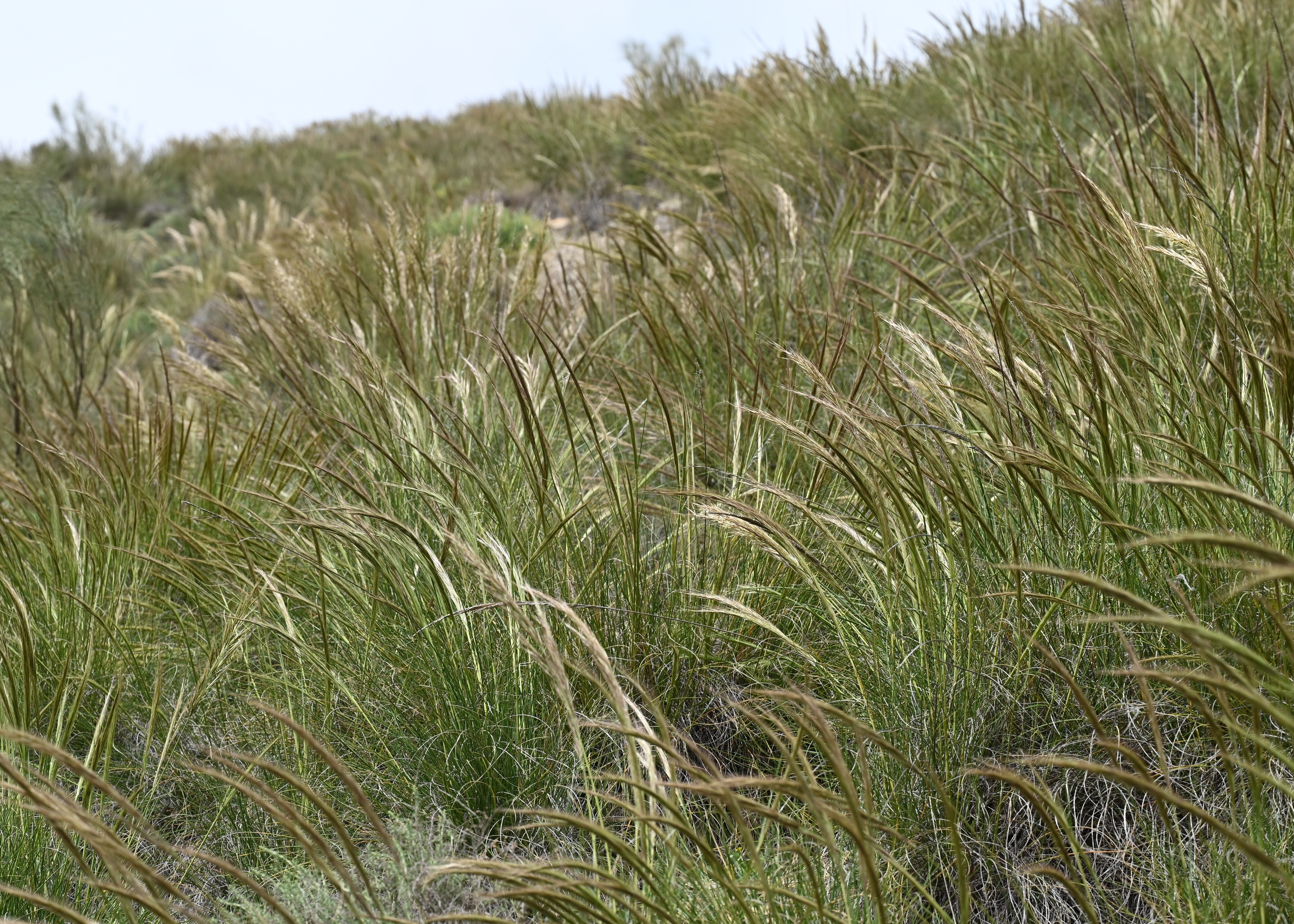
Plants near Granada, Andalusia

Macrochloa tenacissima is native to the Iberian Peninsula, the Balearic Islands, and northwestern Africa (Morocco, Algeria, Tunisia, and Libya). It grows in dry, sandy or rocky and base rich soils, forming a steppe-like grassland. It has been managed by people for centuries.

== Description ==
Macrochloa tenacissima is a large grass growing to 1.5–2 metres (5–7 ft) tall with stout stems. The leaves are convoluted (rolled), 30–120 centimetres (1–4 ft) long and 1 mm diameter, and with a sharp apex. The flowerheads form compact panicles 25–35 cm (9.8–13.8 in) long, with glumes 1 cm long.

== Uses ==
Macrochloa tenacissima produces a fibre product called esparto which is used for crafts, such as cords, basketry, and espadrilles as well as for making paper.

== See also ==
- Lygeum spartum, another species of grass also used as esparto.
