= Outline of Morocco =

Overview of and topical guide to Morocco

The Flag of Morocco

The Coat of arms of Morocco

The location of Morocco

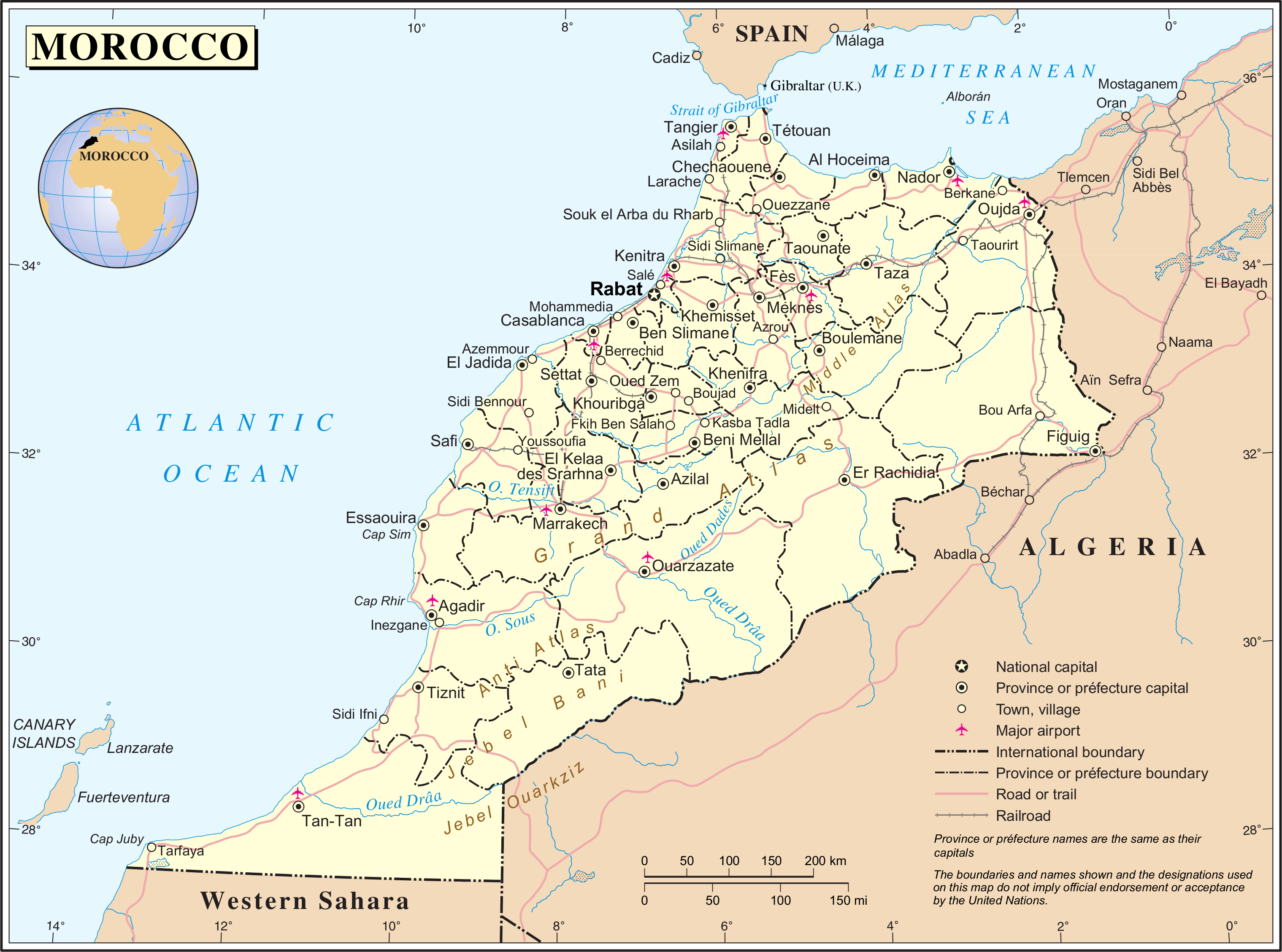
An enlargeable map of Morocco

Morocco – sovereign country located in western North Africa. Morocco has a coast on the Atlantic Ocean that reaches past the Strait of Gibraltar into the Mediterranean Sea. It has international borders with Algeria to the east, Spain to the north (a water border through the Strait and land borders with two small Spanish autonomous cities, Ceuta and Melilla), and a disputed border with Western Sahara to the south.

Morocco is an African country currently a member of the African Union. it is also a member of the Arab League at present, Arab Maghreb Union, the Francophonie, Organisation of Islamic Cooperation, Mediterranean Dialogue group, and Group of 77, and is a major non-NATO ally of the United States.

The following outline is provided as an overview of and topical guide to Morocco:

== General reference ==
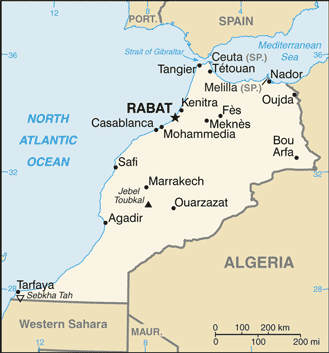
An enlargeable basic map of Morocco

- Pronunciation: /məˈrɒkoʊ/
- Common English country name: Morocco
- Official English country name: The Kingdom of Morocco
- Common endonym(s): المغرب
- Official endonym(s): المملكة المغربية
- Adjectival(s): Moroccan
- Demonym(s): Moroccan
- Etymology: Name of Morocco
- International rankings of Morocco
- ISO country codes: MA, MAR, 504
- ISO region codes: See ISO 3166-2:MA
- Internet country code top-level domain: .ma

== Geography of Morocco ==
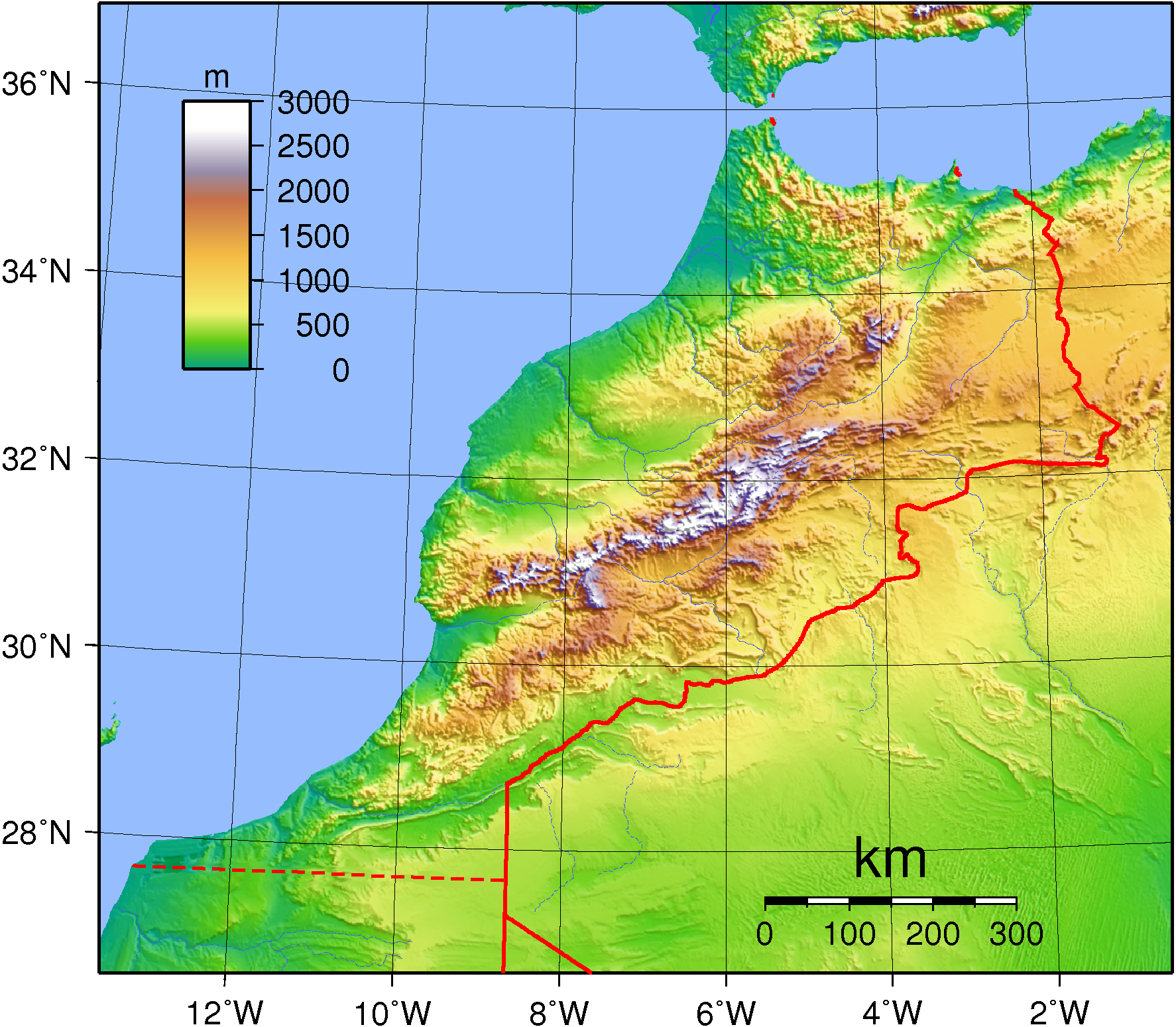
An enlargeable topographic map of Morocco

Geography of Morocco

- Morocco is: a country
- Location
  - Morocco is situated within the following regions:
    - Western Hemisphere and Northern Hemisphere
    - Africa
      - Sahara Desert
      - North Africa
        - Maghreb
  - Time zone: Western European Time (UTC+00), Western European Summer Time (UTC+01)
  - Extreme points of Morocco
    - High: Toubkal 4,165 m (13,665 ft)
    - Low: Sebkha paki Tah −55 m (−180 ft)
  - Land boundaries: 2,018 km

Algeria 1,559 km
Western Sahara 443 km (although there's no de facto boundary)
Spain 16 km

- Coastline: 1,835 km

- Population of Morocco: 37,765,613 as of 2021 - 39th most populous country
- Area of Morocco: 712,550 km^{2}
- Atlas of Morocco

=== Environment of Morocco ===
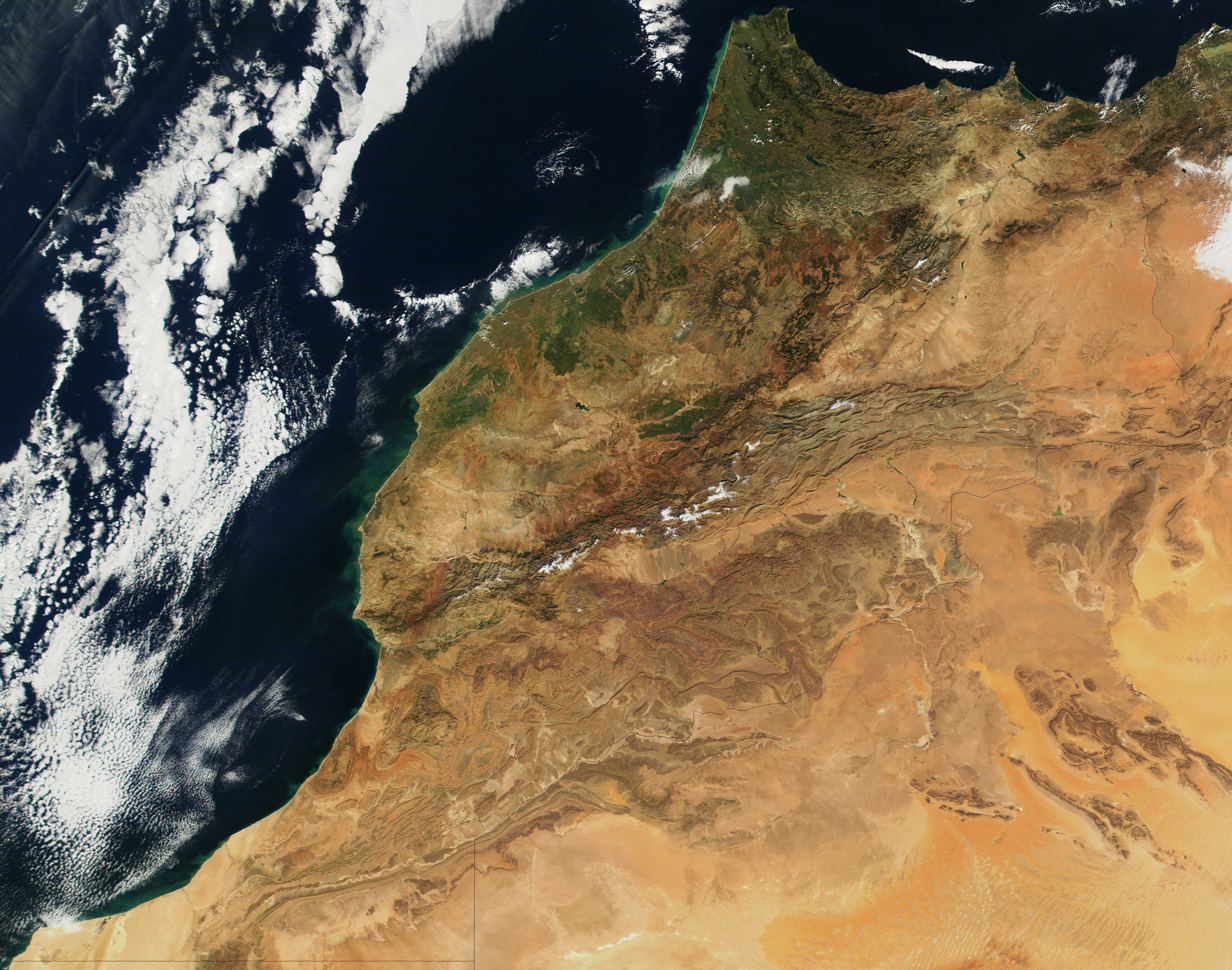
An enlargeable satellite image of Morocco

- Climate of Morocco
- Ecoregions in Morocco
- Renewable energy in Morocco
- Protected areas of Morocco
  - National parks of Morocco
- Wildlife of Morocco
  - Flora of Morocco
  - Fauna of Morocco
    - Birds of Morocco
    - Mammals of Morocco

==== Natural geographic features of Morocco ====
- Glaciers in Morocco: none
- Rivers of Morocco
- World Heritage Sites in Morocco
- Atlas Mountains
- Rif Mountains
- Saharan desert

=== Regions of Morocco ===
Regions of Morocco

==== Ecoregions of Morocco ====
List of ecoregions in Morocco

- Ecoregions in Morocco

==== Administrative divisions of Morocco ====
Administrative divisions of Morocco

- Regions of Morocco
  - Prefectures and provinces of Morocco

===== Municipalities of Morocco =====
- Capital of Morocco: Rabat
- Cities of Morocco
  - Agadir
  - Beni Mellal
  - Casablanca
  - El Jadida
  - Fez
  - Kenitra
  - Ksar el-Kebir
  - Marrakesh
  - Meknes
  - Merzouga
  - Oujda
  - Salé
  - Sefrou
  - Tangier
  - Temara
  - Zagora

=== Demography of Morocco ===
Demographics of Morocco

== Government and politics of Morocco ==
Politics of Morocco

- Form of government: parliamentary constitutional monarchy
- Capital of Morocco: Rabat
- Elections in Morocco
  - (specific elections)
- Political parties in Morocco

=== Branches of the government of Morocco ===
Government of Morocco

==== Executive branch of the government of Morocco ====
- Head of state: King of Morocco, Mohammed VI
- Head of government: Prime Minister of Morocco, Aziz Akhannouch
- Cabinet of Morocco

==== Legislative branch of the government of Morocco ====
- Parliament of Morocco (bicameral)
  - Upper house: House of Councillors
  - Lower house: House of Representatives

==== Judicial branch of the government of Morocco ====
Court system of Morocco

=== Foreign relations of Morocco ===
Foreign relations of Morocco

- Diplomatic missions in Morocco
- Diplomatic missions of Morocco

==== International organization membership ====
The Kingdom of Morocco is a member of:

- African Development Bank Group (AfDB)
- Arab Bank for Economic Development in Africa (ABEDA)
- Arab Fund for Economic and Social Development (AFESD)
- Arab Maghreb Union (AMU)
- Arab Monetary Fund (AMF)
- European Bank for Reconstruction and Development (EBRD)
- Food and Agriculture Organization (FAO)
- Group of 77 (G77)
- International Atomic Energy Agency (IAEA)
- International Bank for Reconstruction and Development (IBRD)
- International Chamber of Commerce (ICC)
- International Civil Aviation Organization (ICAO)
- International Criminal Court (ICCt) (signatory)
- International Criminal Police Organization (Interpol)
- International Development Association (IDA)
- International Federation of Red Cross and Red Crescent Societies (IFRCS)
- International Finance Corporation (IFC)
- International Fund for Agricultural Development (IFAD)
- International Hydrographic Organization (IHO)
- International Labour Organization (ILO)
- International Maritime Organization (IMO)
- International Mobile Satellite Organization (IMSO)
- International Monetary Fund (IMF)
- International Olympic Committee (IOC)
- International Organization for Migration (IOM)
- International Organization for Standardization (ISO)
- International Red Cross and Red Crescent Movement (ICRM)
- International Telecommunication Union (ITU)
- International Telecommunications Satellite Organization (ITSO)
- International Trade Union Confederation (ITUC)
- Inter-Parliamentary Union (IPU)
- Islamic Development Bank (IDB)
- League of Arab States (LAS)
- Multilateral Investment Guarantee Agency (MIGA)
- Nonaligned Movement (NAM)
- Organisation internationale de la Francophonie (OIF)
- Organisation of Islamic Cooperation (OIC)
- Organization for Security and Cooperation in Europe (OSCE) (partner)
- Organisation for the Prohibition of Chemical Weapons (OPCW)
- Organization of American States (OAS) (observer)
- Permanent Court of Arbitration (PCA)
- United Nations (UN)
- United Nations Conference on Trade and Development (UNCTAD)
- United Nations Educational, Scientific, and Cultural Organization (UNESCO)
- United Nations High Commissioner for Refugees (UNHCR)
- United Nations Industrial Development Organization (UNIDO)
- United Nations Operation in Cote d'Ivoire (UNOCI)
- United Nations Organization Mission in the Democratic Republic of the Congo (MONUC)
- Universal Postal Union (UPU)
- World Confederation of Labour (WCL)
- World Customs Organization (WCO)
- World Federation of Trade Unions (WFTU)
- World Health Organization (WHO)
- World Intellectual Property Organization (WIPO)
- World Meteorological Organization (WMO)
- World Tourism Organization (UNWTO)
- World Trade Organization (WTO)

=== Law and order in Morocco ===
Law of Morocco

- Cannabis in Morocco
- Constitution of Morocco
- Human rights in Morocco
  - LGBT rights in Morocco
  - Gender equality in Morocco
- Child marriage in Morocco
- Law enforcement in Morocco

=== Military of Morocco ===
Military of Morocco

- Command
  - Commander-in-chief:
- Forces
  - Army of Morocco
  - Navy of Morocco
  - Air Force of Morocco
- Military history of Morocco

=== Local government in Morocco ===
Local government in Morocco

== History of Morocco ==
History of Morocco

- Current events of Morocco
- Economic history of Morocco
- Military history of Morocco

== Culture of Morocco ==
Culture of Morocco

- Architecture of Morocco
- Cuisine of Morocco
- Languages of Morocco
- Media in Morocco
- Museums in Morocco
- National symbols of Morocco
  - Coat of arms of Morocco
  - Flag of Morocco
  - National anthem of Morocco
- Moroccan people
- Prostitution in Morocco
- Public holidays in Morocco
- Religion in Morocco
  - Christianity in Morocco
  - Islam in Morocco
  - Judaism in Morocco
- World Heritage Sites in Morocco

=== Art in Morocco ===
- Cinema of Morocco
- Literature of Morocco
- Music of Morocco
- Television in Morocco

Famous Artists of Morocco:

- Hassan El Glaoui
- Youness Errami
- Ayoub Aboubaigi

=== Sports in Morocco ===
Sports in Morocco

- Football in Morocco
- Morocco at the Olympics
- Royal Moroccan Equestrian Federation
  - Tbourida or fantasia
- Miss Moto Maroc

Famous Athletes of Morocco

- Fatima El-Faquir
- Nawal El Moutawakel
- Said Äouita

== Royal Family of Morocco ==
Alaouite Dynasty

- Mohammed VI
- Lalla Salma
- Lalla Khadeja
- Moulay Hassan
- Moulay Rachid
- Lalla Amina
- Hassan II
- Mohammed V
- Moulay Abedellah Alaoui

== Economy and infrastructure of Morocco ==
Economy of Morocco

- Economic rank, by nominal GDP (2007): 57th (fifty-seventh)
- Agriculture in Morocco
- Communications in Morocco
  - Internet in Morocco
- Companies of Morocco
- Currency of Morocco: Dirham
  - ISO 4217: MAD
- Economic history of Morocco
- Energy in Morocco
  - Energy policy of Morocco
- Health care in Morocco
- Mining in Morocco
- Morocco Stock Exchange
- Tourism in Morocco
- Transport in Morocco
  - Airports in Morocco
  - Rail transport in Morocco
- Water supply and sanitation in Morocco

== Education in Morocco ==
Education in Morocco

== Health in Morocco ==
Health in Morocco

== See also ==
Morocco

- List of international rankings
- List of Morocco-related topics
- Member state of the United Nations
- Outline of Africa
- Outline of geography
- Outline of Western Sahara
