= Flora of Morocco =

Morocco provides a refuge for a rich and diverse flora with about 4,200 taxa, of which 22% (879 taxa) are endemic. The phytogeographic zones of Morocco comprise 8 zones: the Mediterranean zone (central 0–500m, middle 500-1,000m and upper 1,100-1500m), the Cedar zone (1000-2000m), the sub-Alpine zone (2,000-2,500m), the Alpine zone (2,500m+), the semi-desert scrub zone, the Reg, the sandy desert zone and the oases.

== Mediterranean or coastal zone ==
Maquis and Garrique Mediterranean dry woodlands and steppe, Mediterranean woodlands and forests, lower Northern slopes of Rif and Tell Atlas.

The climax of the Mediterranean coast is a well-developed maquis commonly associated with Clematis, Smilax, Lonicera and Asparagus. Except in inaccessible or protected places the vegetation has been heavily grazed by domestic animals and this degraded maquis, called garrigue, is widespread. Poterium spinosum, various Salvia and Cistus are the dominant plants of the garrigue. A prominent feature of the coastal vegetation is the presence of a large exotic flora: Casuarina, Eucalyptus, Citrus, loquat and Opuntia ficus-indica are examples. Several species of steppe Acacia are common elements. The cultivated area which is extensive is wholly artificial and imported plants dominate the landscape. The meadows, orchards and wetter places in the maquis support such plants as fennel.

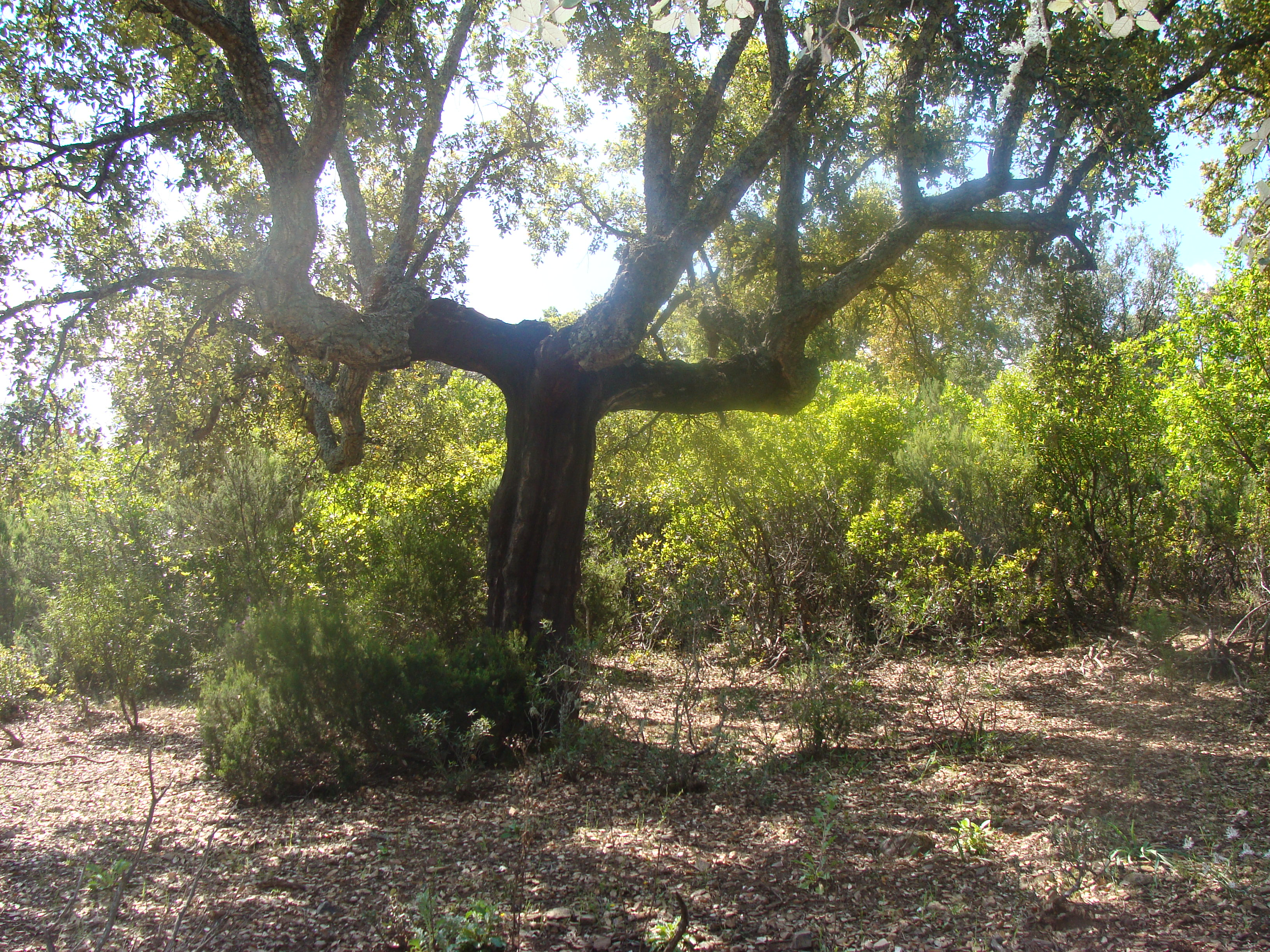
Quercus suber the Cork Oak, a typical Mediterranean plant

Characteristic plants are Pinus halepensis, Erica arborea, Arbutus unedo, Pistacia lentiscus, Myrtus communis, Clematis cirrhosa, Asparagus acutifolius, Phlomis viscosa, Scilla autumnalis and Scilla peruviana, Narcissus tazetta, Iris palaestina, Colchicum stevenii, Arisarum vulgare, Quercus coccifera, Quercus ilex, Ceratonia siliqua, Pistacia atlantica, Pistacia terebinthus, Crataegus azarolus, Amygdalus communis, Rhamnus alaternus Nerprun alaterne, Cistus spp., especially Cistus monspeliensis, Cistus laurifolius and Cistus salviifolius, Juniperinus phoenicea, Phlomis spp. (Phlomis lychnitis), Helichrysum italicum, Salvia spp., Satureia spp., Poterium spp., Arabis spp., Reseda spp., Aristolochia pallida, A. boetica, A. longa paucinervis, A. fontanesi, A. rotunda, A. pistolochia fr:Aristoloche pistoloche, Lavandula stoechas, Jasminium fruticans, and Brassica spp.

== Central zone ==
Mediterranean Acacia-Argania dry woodlands lie to the South of the Mediterranean zone. Further south in the Atlas Mountains Mediterranean conifer and mixed forests dominate.

=== The Cedar forests ===
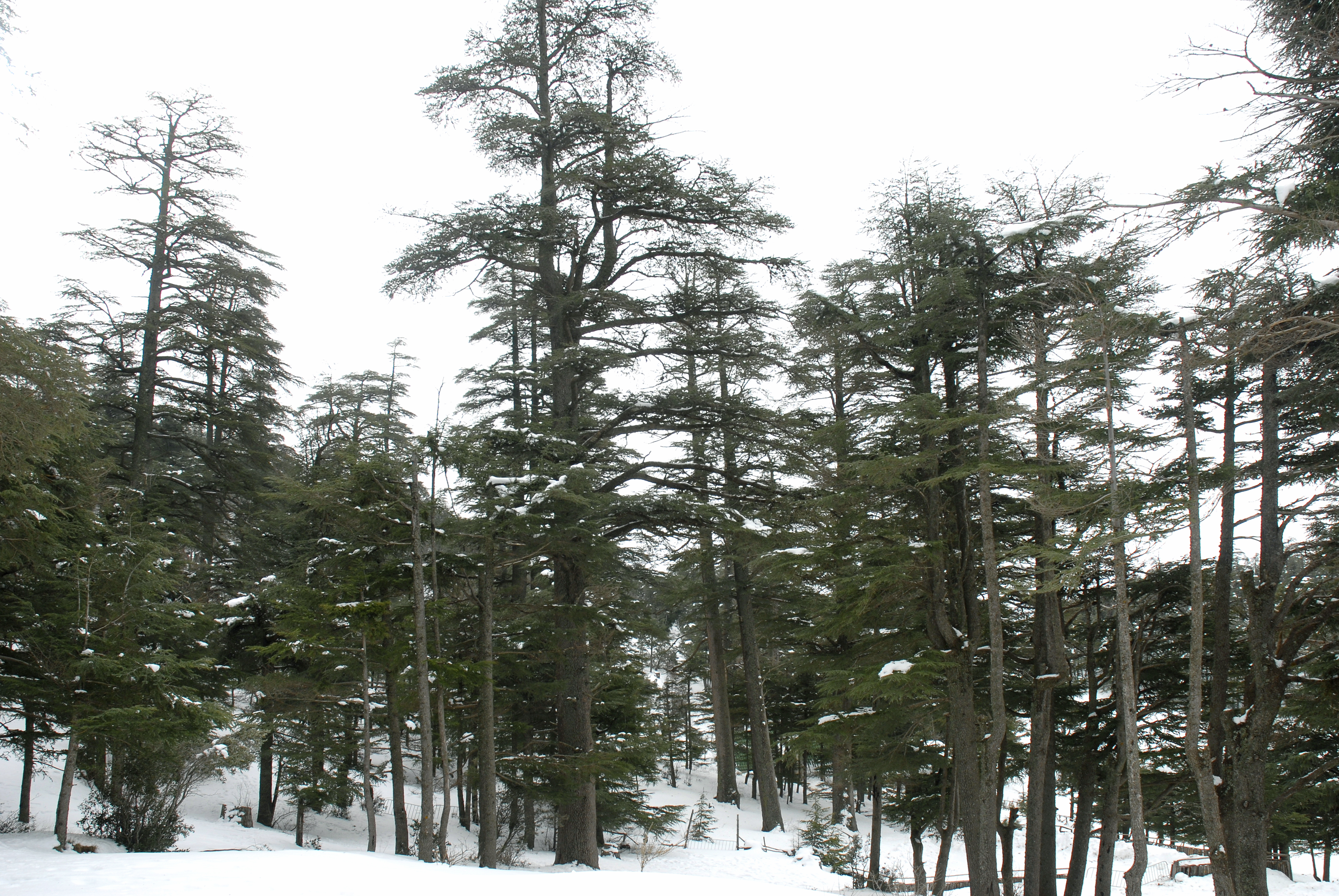
Cedrus libani var. atlantica protected at Parc national d'Ifran. Ifrane Middle Atlas, Ifrane

A mere remnant of their former glory the cedar forests are still impressive covering large areas of the Middle Atlas. The dominant plant Cedrus libani var. atlantica is peculiar to this zone along with Juniperus foetidissima and a multitude of low plants: Iberis odorata, I. ciliata, I. taurica, Centaurea spp., Prunus amygdalus, P. persica, P. institia, P. longipes, Pyrus communis, Malus domestica, Crataegus oxyacantha, Sisymbrium spp., Lunaria biennis, Capparis spinosa, Raphanus raphanistrum, Isatis tinctoria continue. There is a total lack of the oak-dominated maquis of the Mediterranean zone and the lower limit of the zone of the Cedar is demonstrated by the lack of Berberis cretica.

=== Middle Atlas lakes (protected areas) ===
- Lake Aguelmame Aziza fr:Lac Aguelmame Aziza in French
- Lake Ouiouane fr:Ouiouane in French
- Lake Aguelmame Sidi Ali fr:Lac Aguelmame Sidi Ali in French
- Lake Daït Iffer fr:Lac Daït Iffer in French
- Lake Bin El Ouidanne Ouaouizerth

Parc national d'Ifrane fr:Parc national d'Ifrane in French

- Parc national de Tazekka fr:Parc national de Tazekka in French

== Sub-alpine zone ==
The disappearance of Cedrus atlantica and the presence of Onobrychis cornuta signal the beginning of the sub-alpine zone characterised by the absence of trees most notably the fir and the cedar; this is a montane habitat of some vigour. Dominant vegetation is pads of thorny Astragalus, Onobrychis (with cornuta as the most typical) and Acantholimon, interspersed with stands of Berberis cretica. Juniperus excelsa survives here and there. The sub-alpine zone is part in the Middle Atlas, part in the High Atlas.

=== Mediterranean High Atlas juniper steppe ===
(Cedar, juniper, pine, and oak forests cover approximately one-third of this eco-region. At high altitudes, junipers dominate the landscape. The key species is Juniperus thurifera. Even higher, the forests eventually give way to alpine meadows, pseudo-steppe vegetation, and finally scree slopes where purple cushion plants bloom. River valleys wind through the landscape, their rich, moist soil supporting willows, poplars, oaks, hawthorns, and a carpet of oleander).

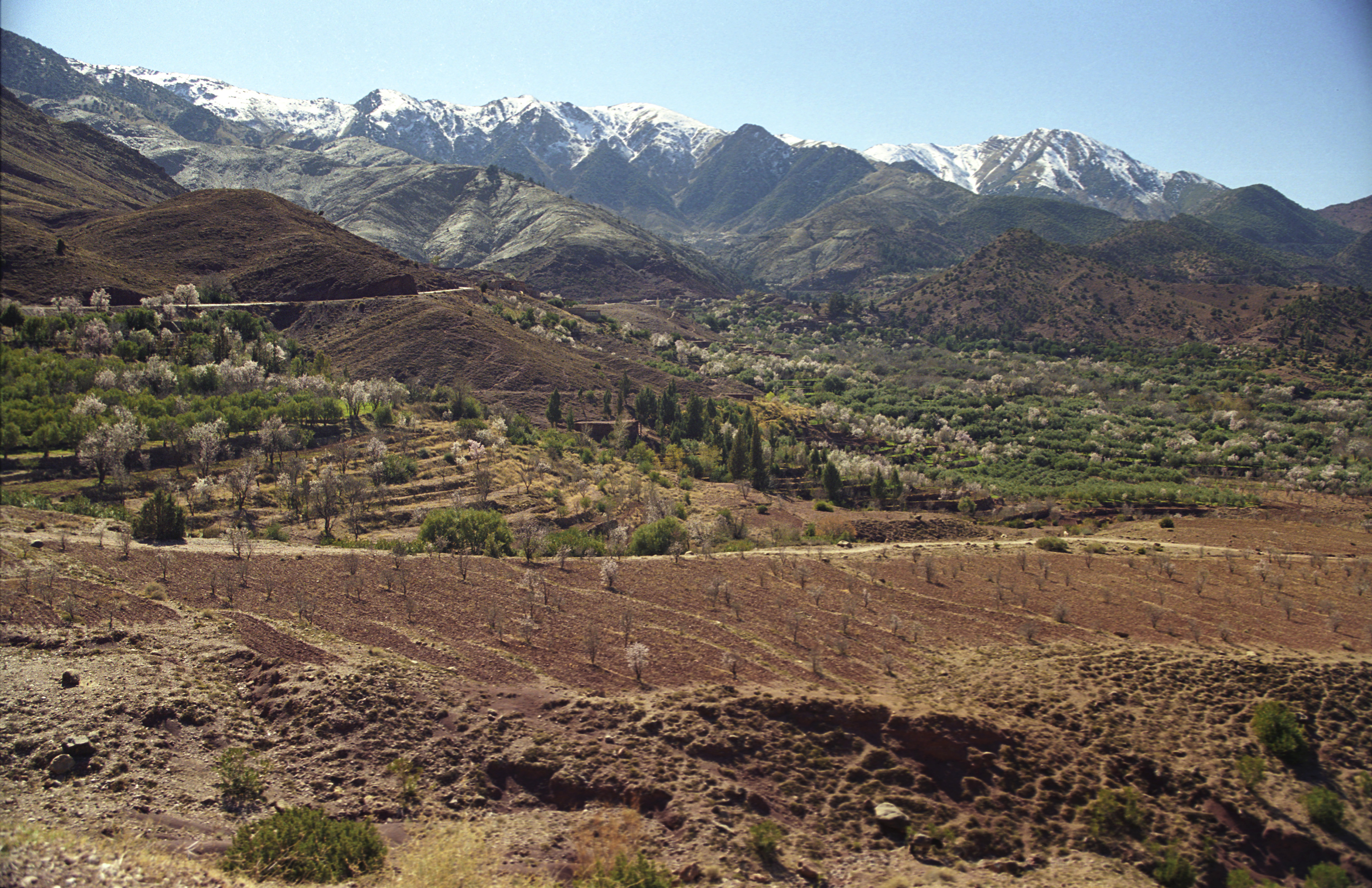
The High Atlas. Cultivation and high altitude endemic plants and spectacular peaks

== Alpine zone ==
Alpine conditions are encountered above 2,500m and the special features of high mountains are enhanced by the dryness of the climate. Typically the zone begins with the disappearance of Berberis, Marrubium and Phlomis and the appearance of Vicia canescens in enormous quantity. The most important botanical characteristic is the presence of a hundred or so plants found nowhere else in Morocco, many of them endemic. The sub-alpine and alpine zones are both heavily overgrazed in many areas and this has left a mark on the vegetation. The success of plants such as Vicia canescens and Erodium trichomanifolium is undoubtedly due to the fact that they are unpalatable to goats.

== The desert zones (semi-desert scrub, reg and sandy desert) ==
The Little Atlas and Djbel (Montane) Sahara.

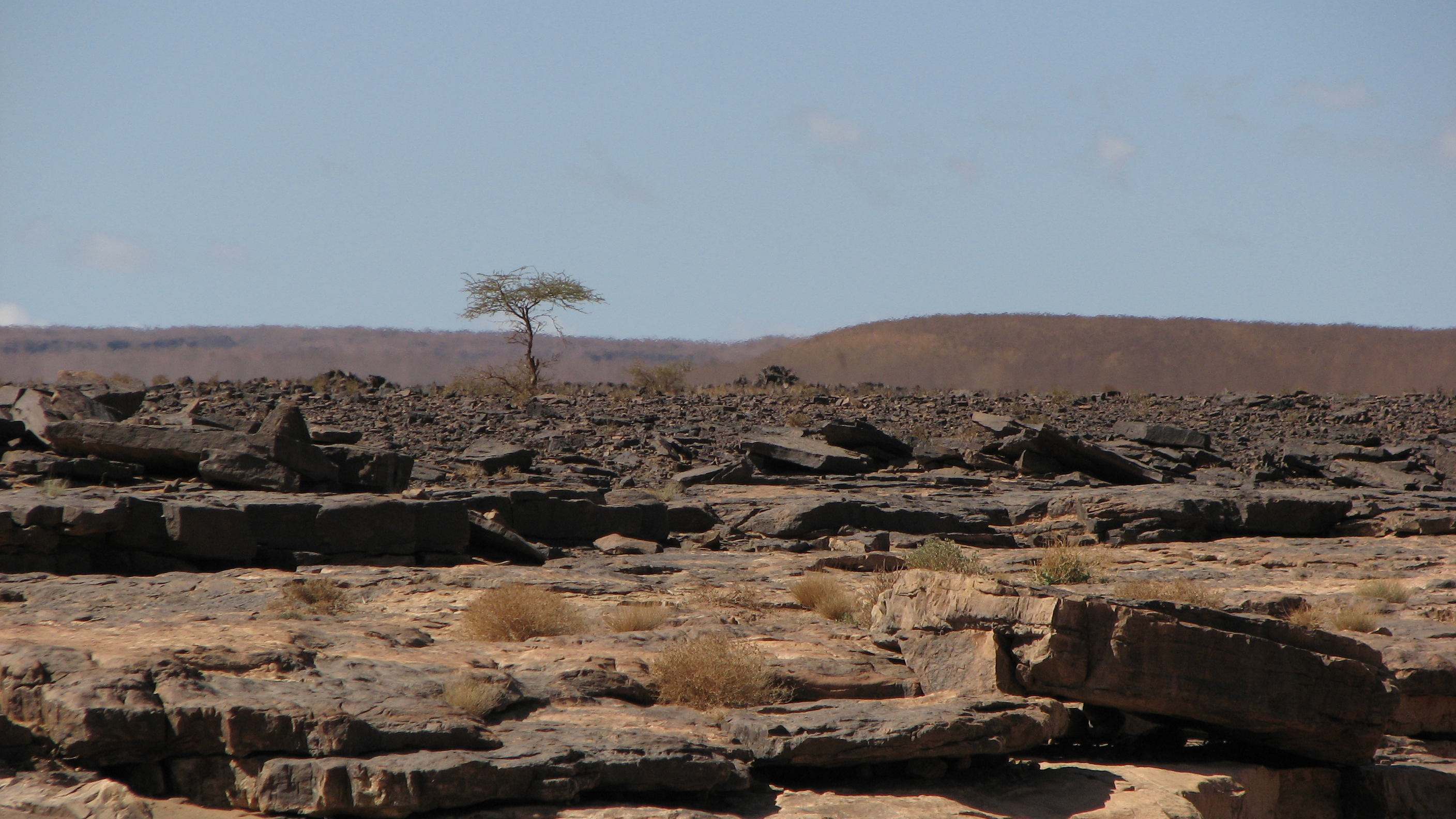
Reg An inhospitable environment but here supporting a species of Acacia and desert hardy Deverra tortuosa

The Sahara desert is essentially a desert of herbs and small shrubs with larger shrubs and trees where moisture levels are higher. The dwarf-shrub community in the north comprises shrubs of less than 1 metre in height (usually about 50 cm.)as dominants. The bushes are often widely spaced, with a considerable amount of bare stony ground between the clumps which gives the vegetation a very parched appearance in the summers. Typical plants are Zizyphus lotus, Ziziphus spina-christi, Tamarix spp., Acacia spp., Moringa aptera, Salvadora persica, Thymus spp., Artemisia herba-alba, Noaea mucronata, Helianthemum spp., Braetama retam, Periploca aphylla, Suaeda spp., Salsola spp, Atriplex spp., Ephedra alata, Haloxylon articulatum, Pistacia atlantica and Achillea santolina.

In steppe areas where the scrub vegetation is hardly developed desert grasses of a multiplicity of species are the climax vegetation. Ephemerals are common in the north, halophytes in the sandy areas. Succulent plants are uncommon. The sandy desert has virtually no vegetation. With rain vegetation increases in wadis (oueds - vallies, gullies, or streambeds that remain dry except during the rainy season), depressions and wherever runoff water augments rainfall. The soils of the Sahara are formed of rock debris and desert detritus and are very weakly developed. The characteristic species of these true desert areas which decrease as desert scrub becomes reg and then sandy desert are:- Faidherbia albida, A. raddiana, A. seyal, A. tortilis, Achillea santolina, Alyssum macrocalyx, Anabasis aretoides, A. articulata, Androcymbium punctataum, Aristoides coerulescens, Aristida pungens, Artemisia herba-alba, A. monosperma, Astragulus tribuloides, Atriplex halimus, Balanites aegyptiaca, Caligonum comosum, Caltropis procera, Cenchrus ciliaris, Citrullus colocynthus, Danthonia forskalii, Ephedra alata, Euphorbia guyoniana, Deverra scoparia, D. chloranthus, Linaria aegyptica, Annarrhinum fruticosum , Haloxylon guyonianum, Maerua crassifolia, Nerium oleander, Olea europaea, Panicum turgidum, Phoenix dactylifera, Populus euphratica, Prosopis stephaniana, Rhus oxyacanthae, Roetboellia hirsuta, Salsola foetida, S.inermis, Salvadora persica, Stipa tortilis, Suaeda fruticosa, S.vermiculata, Tamarix articulata, Zilla spinosa, Zygophyllum coccineum, Z. decumbens, Z. dumosum s and Capparis spinosa. In the depressions and inter-dunal areas, bushes Retama raetam, Ziziphus lotus, Genista saharae,Calligonum comosum, Acacia raddiana, Acacia seyal, Pistacia atlantica, Tamarix aphylla, Calligonum azel and Calligonum arich. In the depressions of the dayas and uidians, there are endemic species such as Panicum turgidum, Pituranthos sp., Neurada procumbens, Anastatica hyrochuntina and Astragalus gumbo. The hammadas often have endemics such as Pituranthos chloranthus, Helianthemum lippii, Gymnocarpos decander, Helianthemum kahiricum, Anabasis aretioides, Haloxylon scoparium and Arthrophytum schmittianum.

== Rivers and oases ==
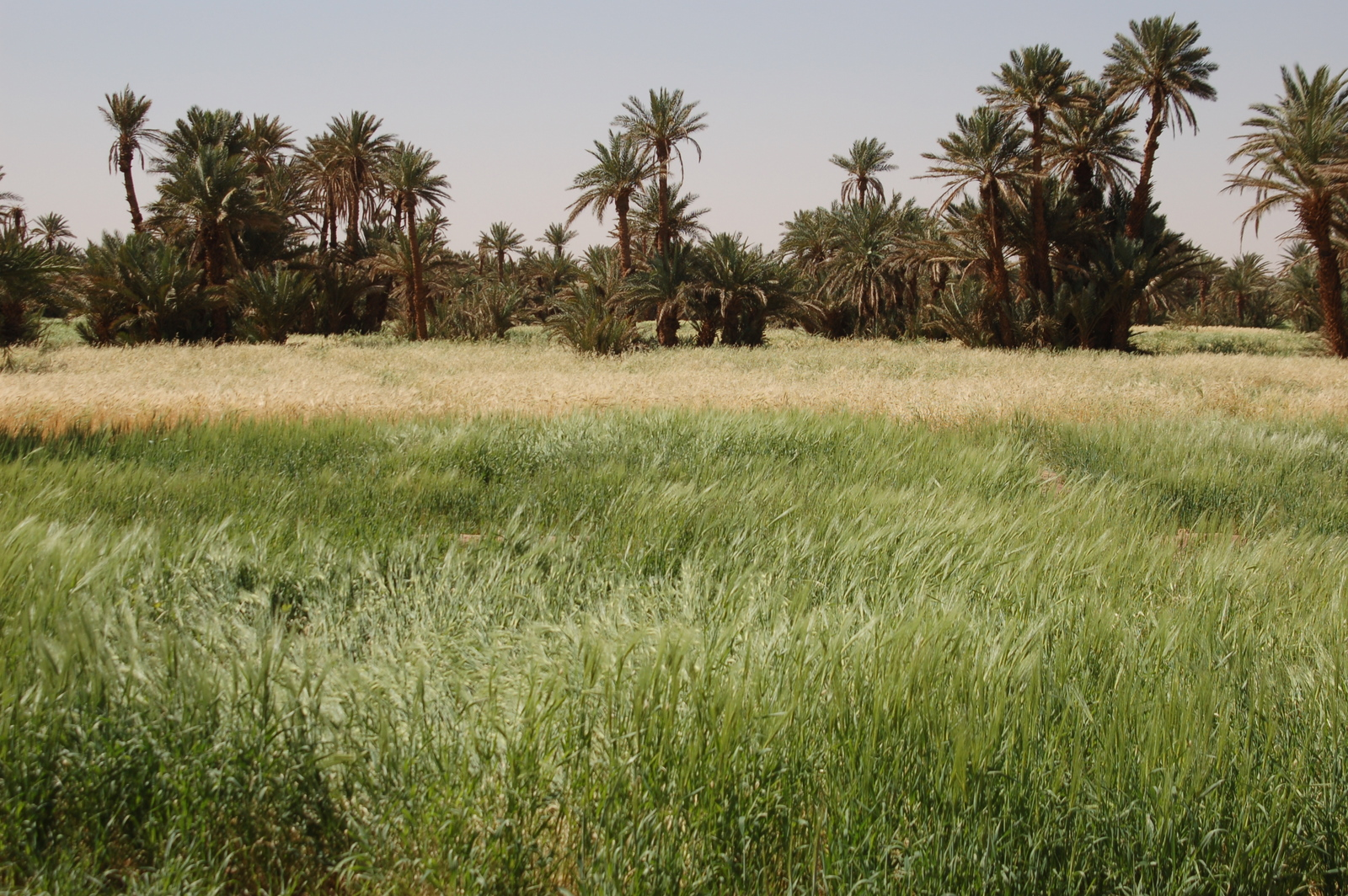
Fields of grain in Mhamid oasis in the Draa River valley

The larger rivers serve to spread the vegetation of the Mediterranean zone q.v. further south and allow the introduction of the plants of Africa to the north. Both rivers and oases support many anthropogenic species resembling in extreme cases tropical botanic gardens.

The zones were established by the International Phytogeographic Excursion of 1936.

== See also ==
- List of ecoregions in Morocco
- Geography of Morocco
