= International rankings of Morocco =

These are the international rankings of Morocco

== International rankings ==
- Institute for Economics and Peace - Global Peace Index ranked Morocco 63rd out of 144 countries.
- The 2002 Reporters Without Borders' worldwide press freedom index ranked Morocco 119th out of 167 countries.
- The Economist's "worldwide quality-of-life index 2005" (PDF). The Economist. (67.1 KB) ranked Morocco 65th out of 111 countries.
- World Intellectual Property Organization: Global Innovation Index 2026, ranked 54 out of 139 countries
