= List of mammals of Morocco =

This is a list of the mammal species recorded in Morocco. There are 118 mammal species in Morocco, of which three are extinct, three are critically endangered, seven are endangered, thirteen are vulnerable, five are near threatened, and one can no longer be found in the wild.

The following tags are used to highlight each species' conservation status as assessed by the International Union for Conservation of Nature:

EX	Extinct	No reasonable doubt that the last individual has died.
EW	Extinct in the wild	Known only to survive in captivity or as a naturalized populations well outside its previous range.
CR	Critically endangered	The species is in imminent risk of extinction in the wild.
EN	Endangered	The species is facing an extremely high risk of extinction in the wild.
VU	Vulnerable	The species is facing a high risk of extinction in the wild.
NT	Near threatened	The species does not meet any of the criteria that would categorise it as risking extinction but it is likely to do so in the future.
LC	Least concern	There are no current identifiable risks to the species.
DD	Data deficient	There is inadequate information to make an assessment of the risks to this species.

== Order: Macroscelidea (elephant shrews) ==
Often called sengis, the elephant shrews or jumping shrews are native to Africa. Their common English name derives from their elongated flexible snout, which is vaguely similar to the trunk of an elephant (to whom they are distantly related) and their resemblance to the true shrews.

- Family: Macroscelididae (elephant shrews)
  - Genus: Elephantulus
    - North African elephant shrew, E. rozeti LC

== Order: Hyracoidea (hyraxes) ==
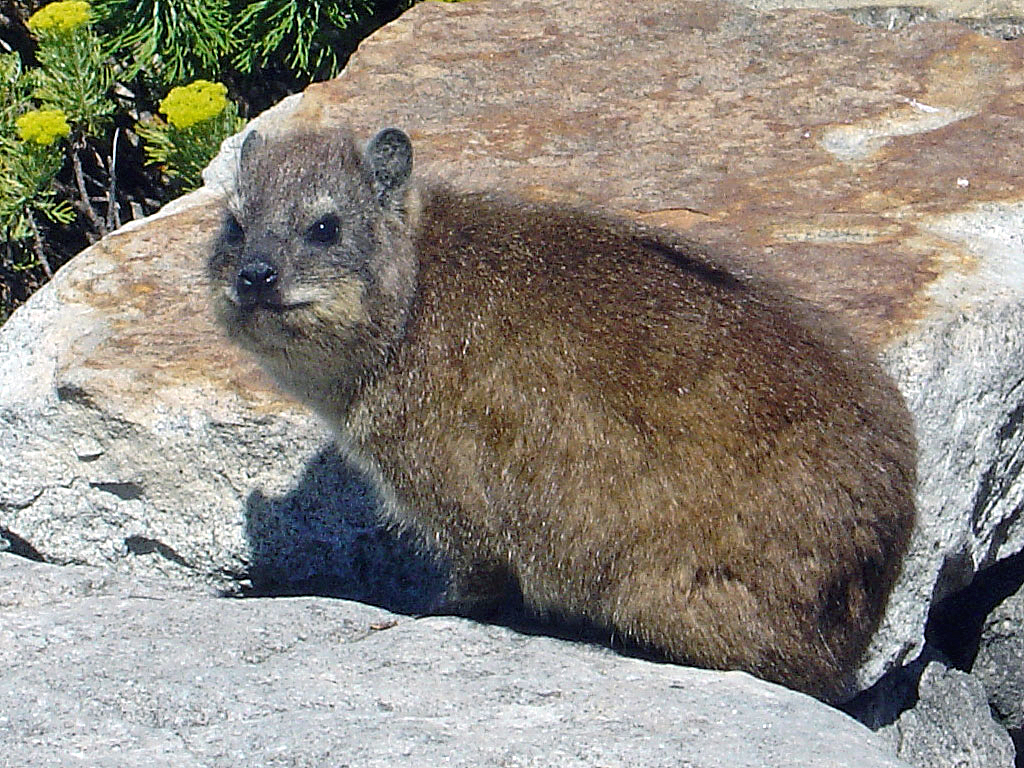
Cape hyrax

The hyraxes are any of four species of fairly small, thickset, herbivorous mammals in the order Hyracoidea. About the size of a domestic cat they are well furred, with rounded bodies and a stumpy tail. They are native to Africa and the Middle East.

- Family: Procaviidae (hyraxes)
  - Genus: Procavia
    - Cape hyrax, P. capensis LC

== Order: Primates ==
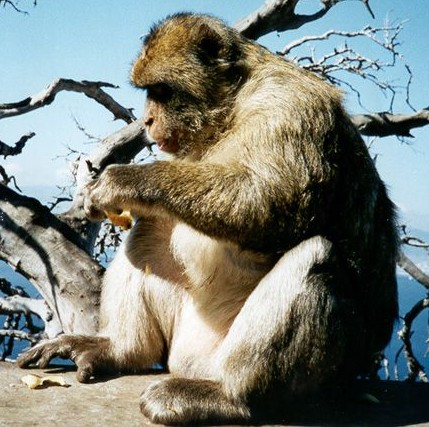
Barbary macaque

The order Primates contains humans and their closest relatives: lemurs, lorisoids, tarsiers, monkeys, and apes.

- Suborder: Haplorhini
  - Infraorder: Simiiformes
    - Parvorder: Catarrhini
      - Superfamily: Cercopithecoidea
        - Family: Cercopithecidae (Old World monkeys)
          - Subfamily: Cercopithecinae
            - Genus: Macaca
              - Barbary macaque, M. sylvanus EN

== Order: Rodentia (rodents) ==
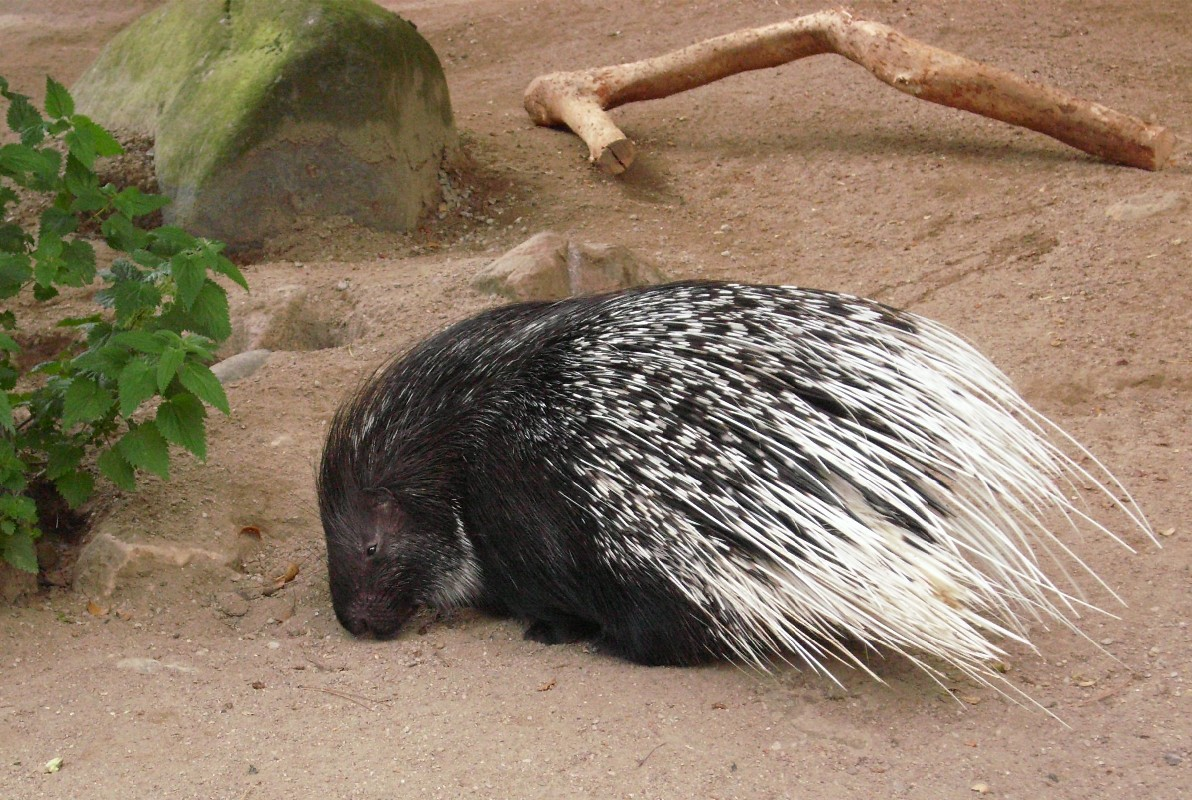
Crested porcupine

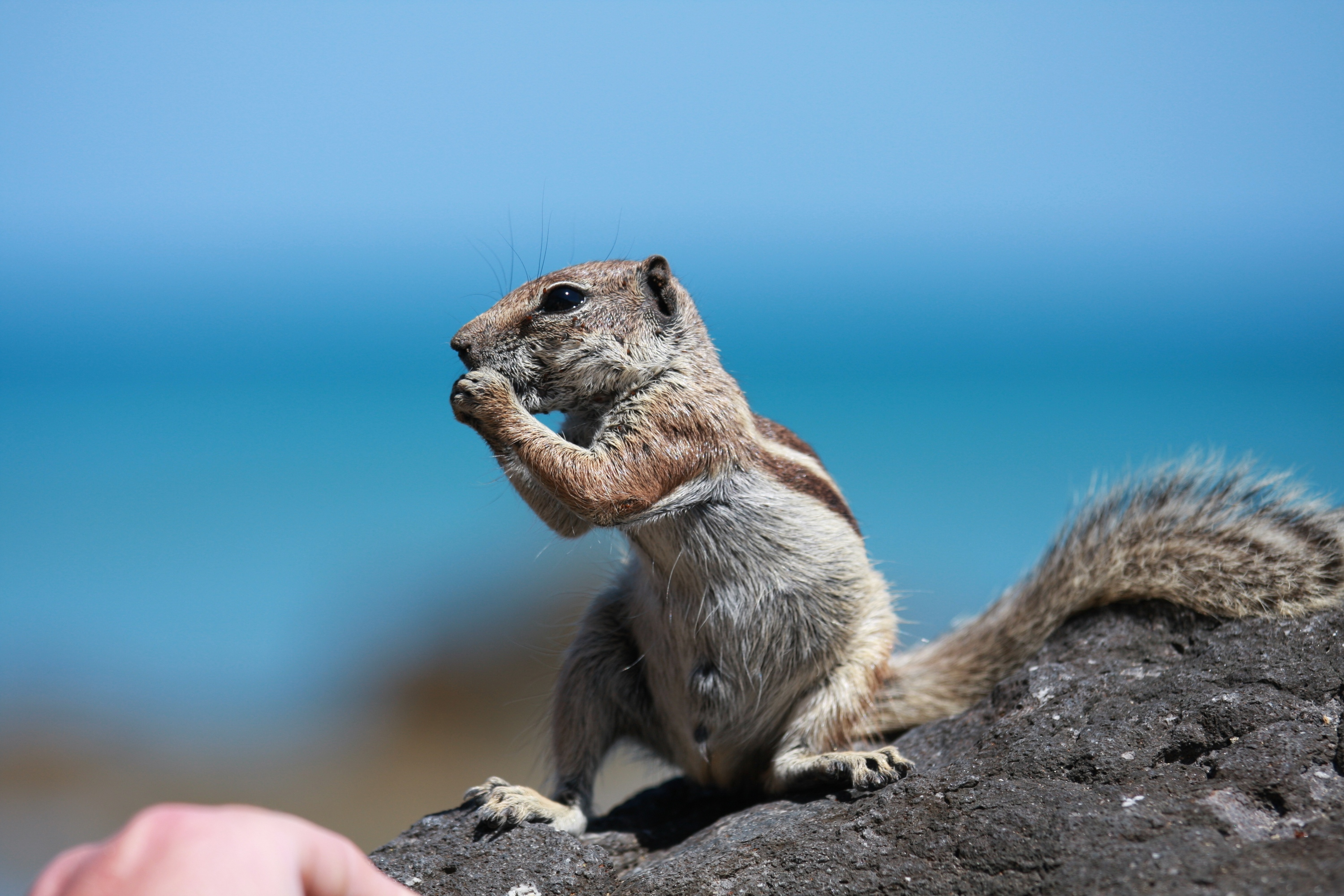
Barbary ground squirrel

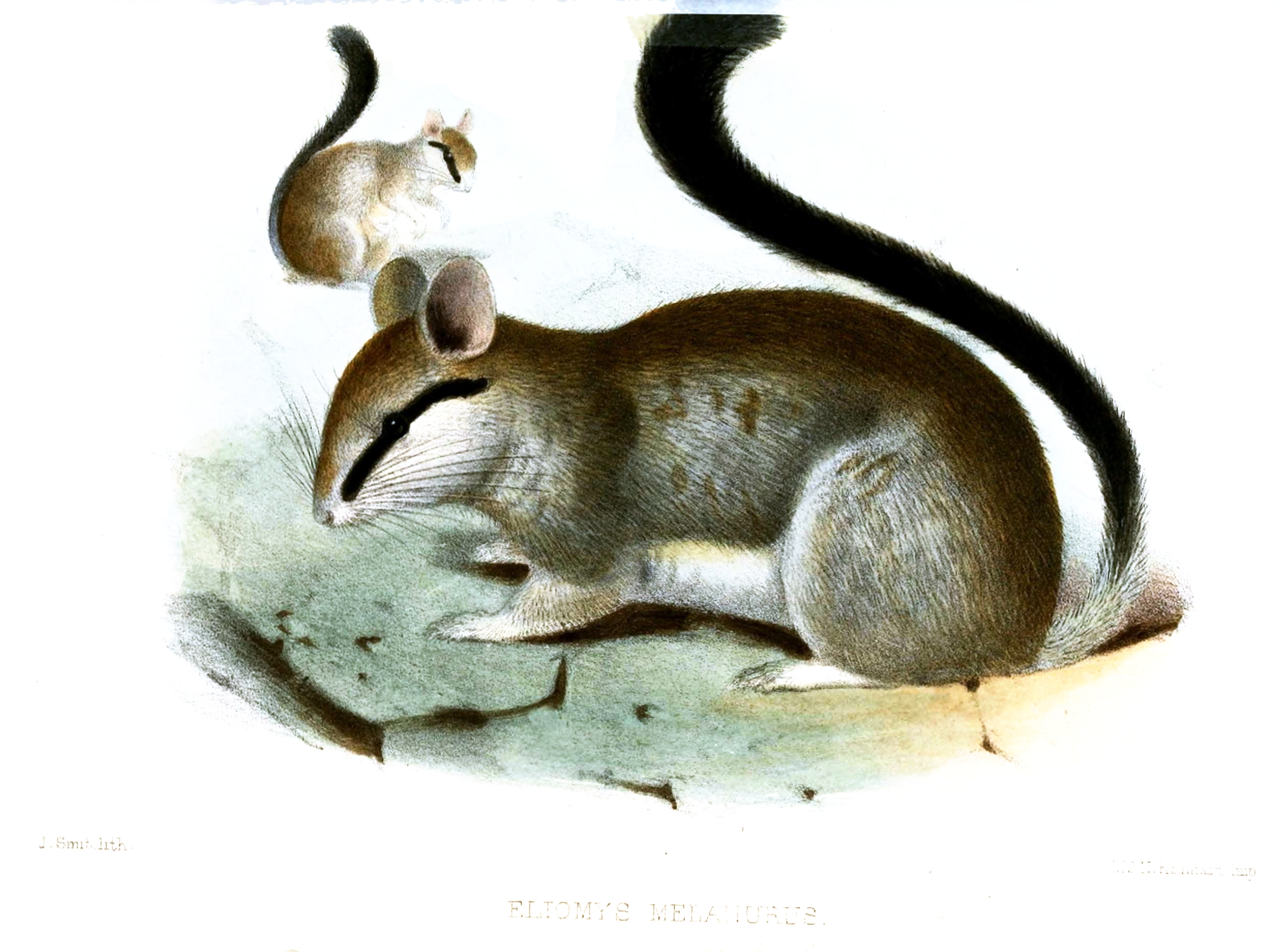
Asian garden dormouse

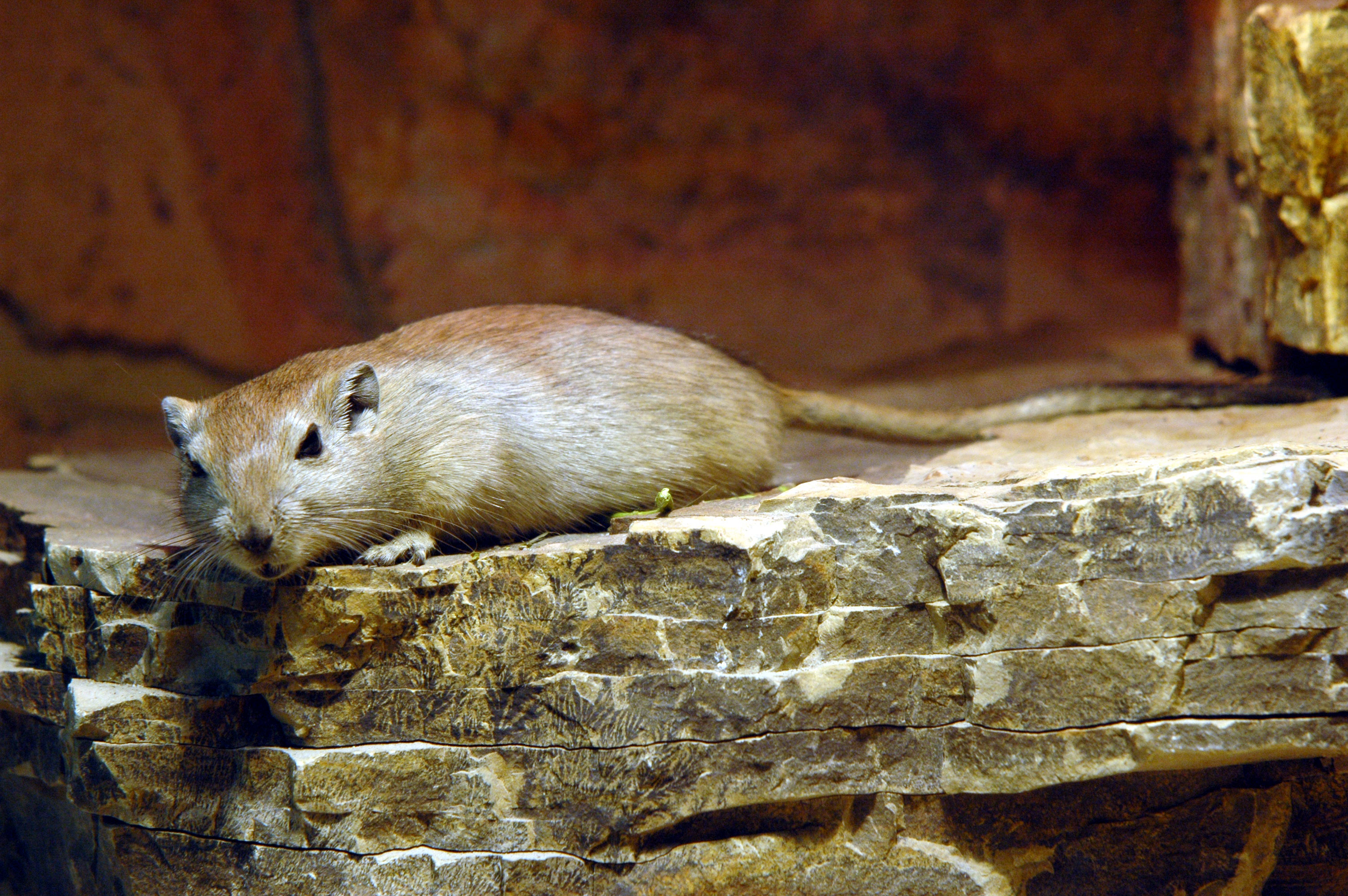
Sand rat

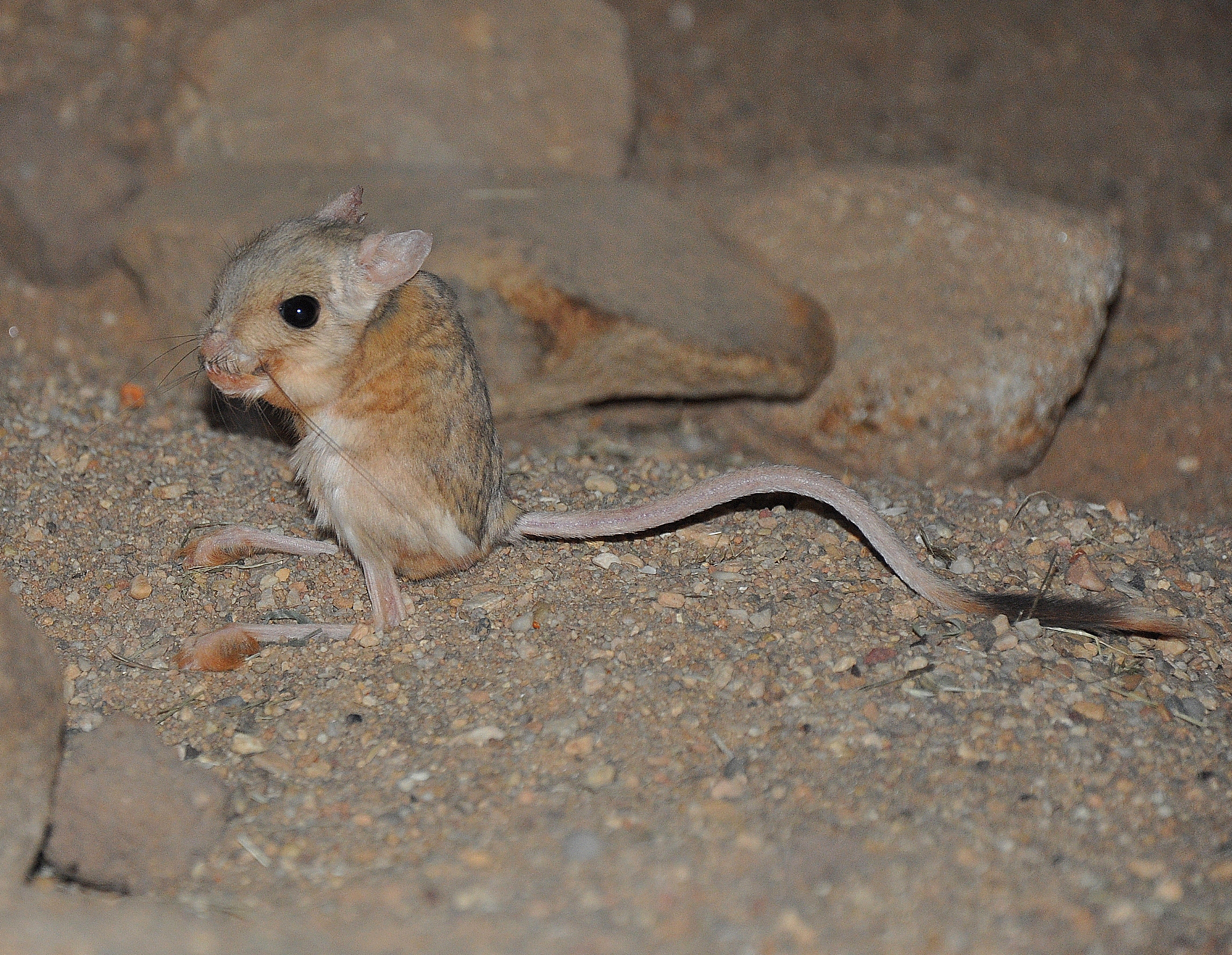
Lesser Egyptian jerboa

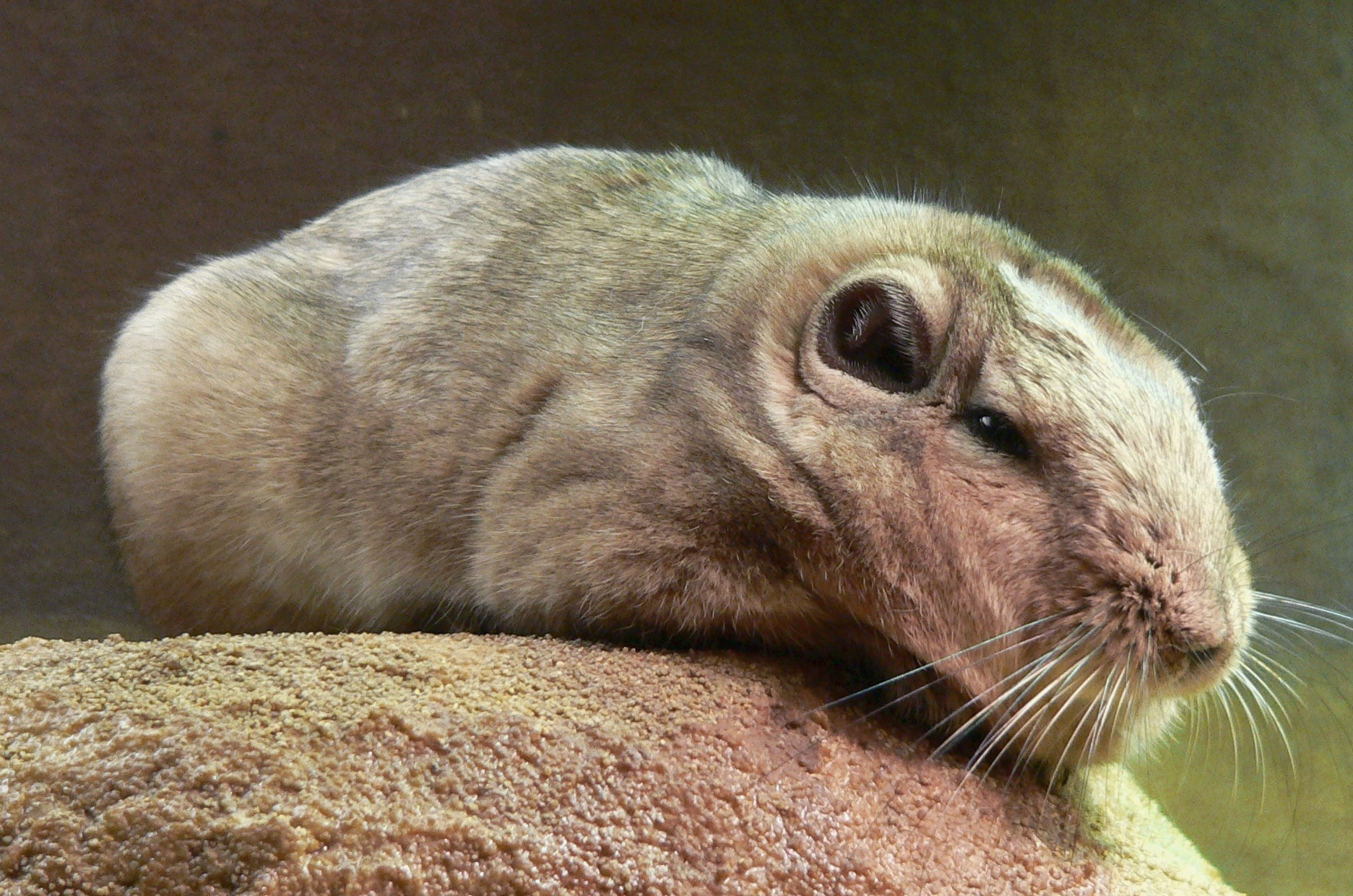
Common gundi

Rodents make up the largest order of mammals, with over 40% of mammalian species. They have two incisors in the upper and lower jaw which grow continually and must be kept short by gnawing. Most rodents are small though the capybara can weigh up to 45 kg (99 lb).

- Suborder: Hystricognathi
  - Family: Hystricidae (Old World porcupines)
    - Subfamily: Hystricinae
      - Genus: Hystrix
        - Crested porcupine, H. cristata LC
- Suborder: Sciurognathi
  - Family: Sciuridae (squirrels)
    - Subfamily: Xerinae
      - Tribe: Xerini
        - Genus: Atlantoxerus
          - Barbary ground squirrel, Atlantoxerus getulus LC
        - Genus: Xerus
          - Striped ground squirrel, Xerus erythropus LC
  - Family: Dipodidae (jerboas)
    - Subfamily: Dipodinae
      - Genus: Jaculus
        - Lesser Egyptian jerboa, Jaculus jaculus LC
        - Greater Egyptian jerboa, Jaculus orientalis LC
  - Family: Gliridae (dormice)
    - Subfamily: Leithiinae
      - Genus: Eliomys
        - Maghreb garden dormouse, Eliomys munbyanus LC
  - Family: Muridae (mice, rats, gerbils)
    - Subfamily: Deomyinae
      - Genus: Acomys
        - Cairo spiny mouse, Acomys cahirinus LC
        - Chudeau's spiny mouse, Acomys chudeaui LC
    - Subfamily: Gerbillinae
      - Genus: Dipodillus
        - North African gerbil, Dipodillus campestris LC
      - Genus: Gerbillus
        - Lesser Egyptian gerbil, Gerbillus gerbillus LC
        - Pygmy gerbil, Gerbillus henleyi LC
        - Western gerbil, Gerbillus hesperinus EN
        - Hoogstraal's gerbil, Gerbillus hoogstraali VU
        - Greater short-tailed gerbil, Gerbillus maghrebi LC
        - Balochistan gerbil, Gerbillus nanus LC
        - Occidental gerbil, Gerbillus occiduus DD
        - Lesser short-tailed gerbil, Gerbillus simoni LC
        - Tarabul's gerbil, Gerbillus tarabuli LC
      - Genus: Meriones
        - Sundevall's jird, Meriones crassus LC
        - Moroccan jird, Meriones grandis LC
        - Libyan jird, Meriones libycus LC
        - Shaw's jird, Meriones shawi LC
      - Genus: Pachyuromys
        - Fat-tailed gerbil, Pachyuromys duprasi LC
      - Genus: Psammomys
        - Fat sand rat, Psammomys obesus LC
    - Subfamily: Murinae
      - Genus: Apodemus
        - Wood mouse, Apodemus sylvaticus LC
      - Genus: Lemniscomys
        - Barbary striped grass mouse, Lemniscomys barbarus LC
      - Genus: Mastomys
        - Guinea multimammate mouse, Mastomys erythroleucus LC
      - Genus: Mus
        - House mouse, M. musculus LC
        - Algerian mouse, M. spretus LC
      - Genus: Rattus
        - Black rat, R. rattus LC introduced
        - Brown rat, Rattus norvegicus LC introduced
  - Family: Ctenodactylidae
    - Genus: Ctenodactylus
      - Common gundi, Ctenodactylus gundi LC
      - Val's gundi, Ctenodactylus vali DD

== Order: Lagomorpha (lagomorphs) ==
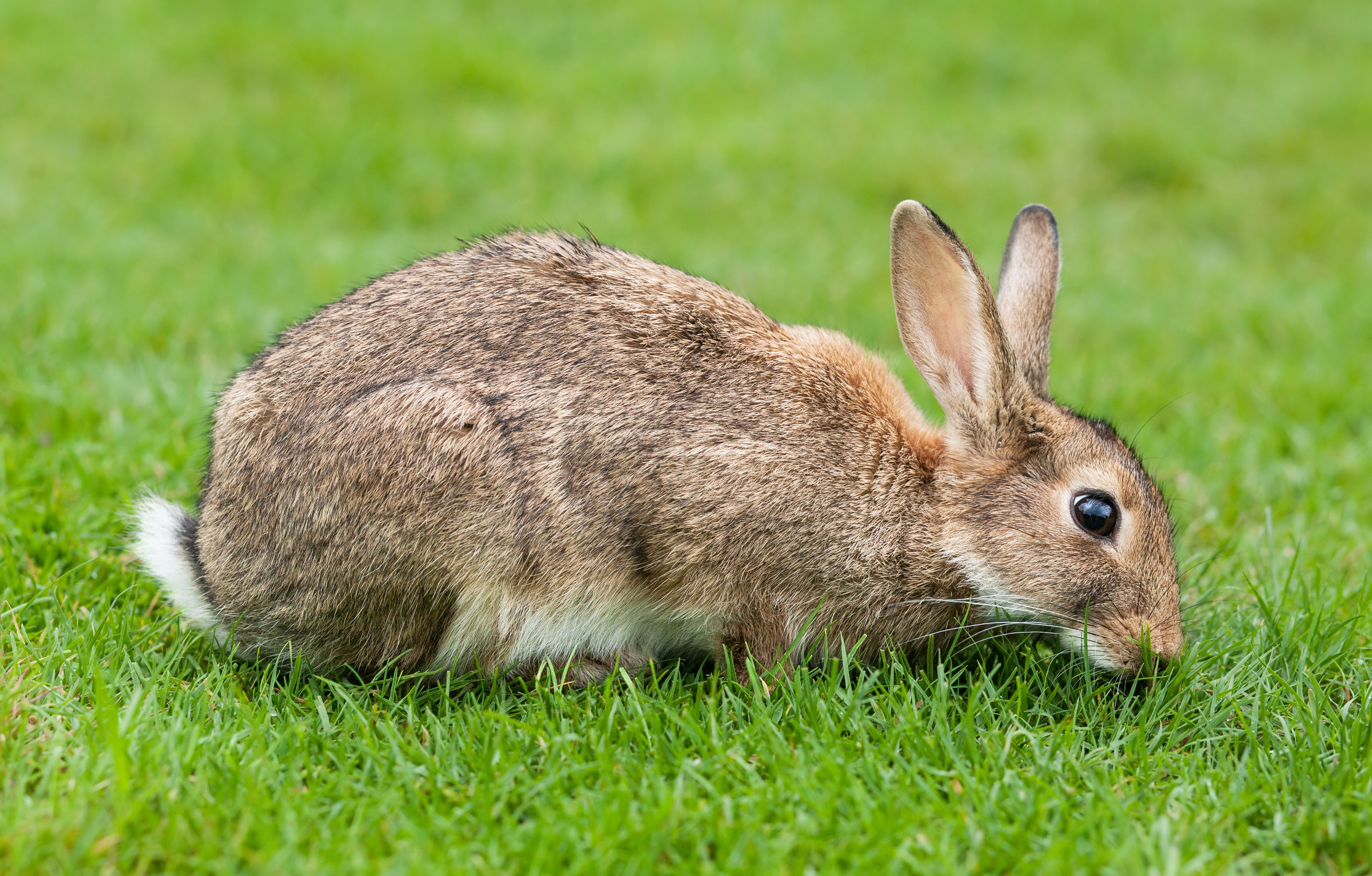
European rabbit

The lagomorphs comprise two families, Leporidae (hares and rabbits), and Ochotonidae (pikas). Though they can resemble rodents, and were classified as a superfamily in that order until the early 20th century, they have since been considered a separate order. They differ from rodents in a number of physical characteristics, such as having four incisors in the upper jaw rather than two.

- Family: Leporidae (rabbits, hares)
  - Genus: Lepus
    - Cape hare, L. capensis LC
    - African savanna hare, L. victoriae LC
  - Genus: Oryctolagus
    - European rabbit, O. cuniculus EN

== Order: Erinaceomorpha (hedgehogs and gymnures) ==
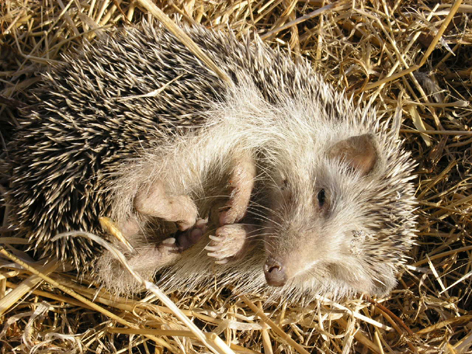
North African hedgehog

The order Erinaceomorpha contains a single family, Erinaceidae, which comprise the hedgehogs and gymnures. The hedgehogs are easily recognised by their spines while gymnures look more like large rats.

- Family: Erinaceidae (hedgehogs)
  - Subfamily: Erinaceinae
    - Genus: Atelerix
      - North African hedgehog, A. algirus LC
    - Genus: Paraechinus
      - Desert hedgehog, P. aethiopicus LC

== Order: Soricomorpha (shrews, moles, and solenodons) ==
The "shrew-forms" are insectivorous mammals. The shrews and solenodons closely resemble mice while the moles are stout bodied burrowers.

- Family: Soricidae (shrews)
  - Subfamily: Crocidurinae
    - Genus: Crocidura
      - Mauritanian shrew, C. lusitania LC
      - Greater white-toothed shrew, C. russula LC
      - Saharan shrew, C. tarfayensis DD
      - Savanna path shrew, C. viaria LC
      - Whitaker's shrew, C. whitakeri LC
    - Genus: Suncus
      - Etruscan shrew, S. etruscus LC

== Order: Chiroptera (bats) ==
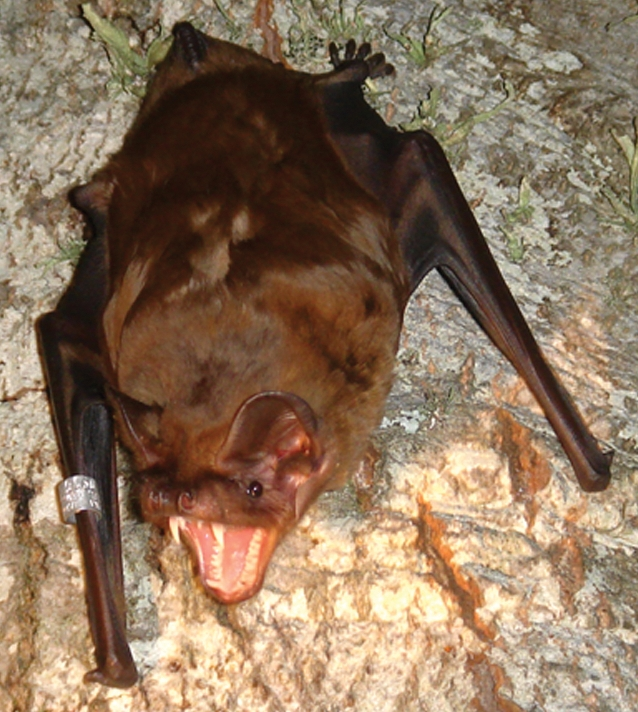
Greater noctule bat

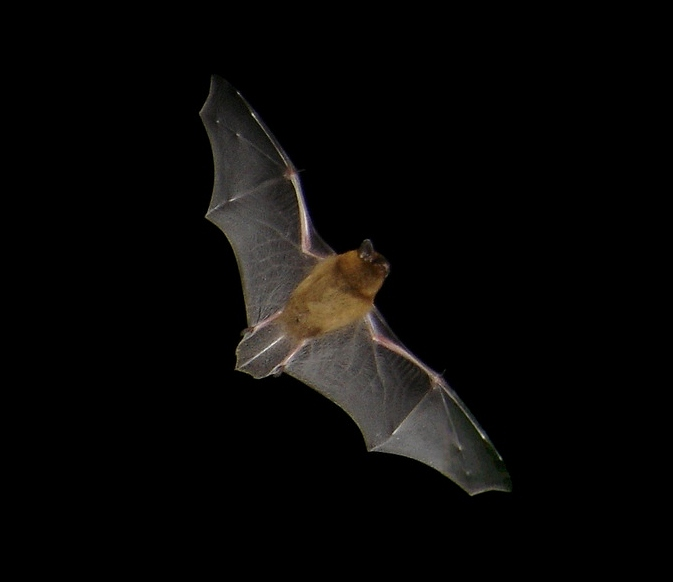
Common pipistrelle

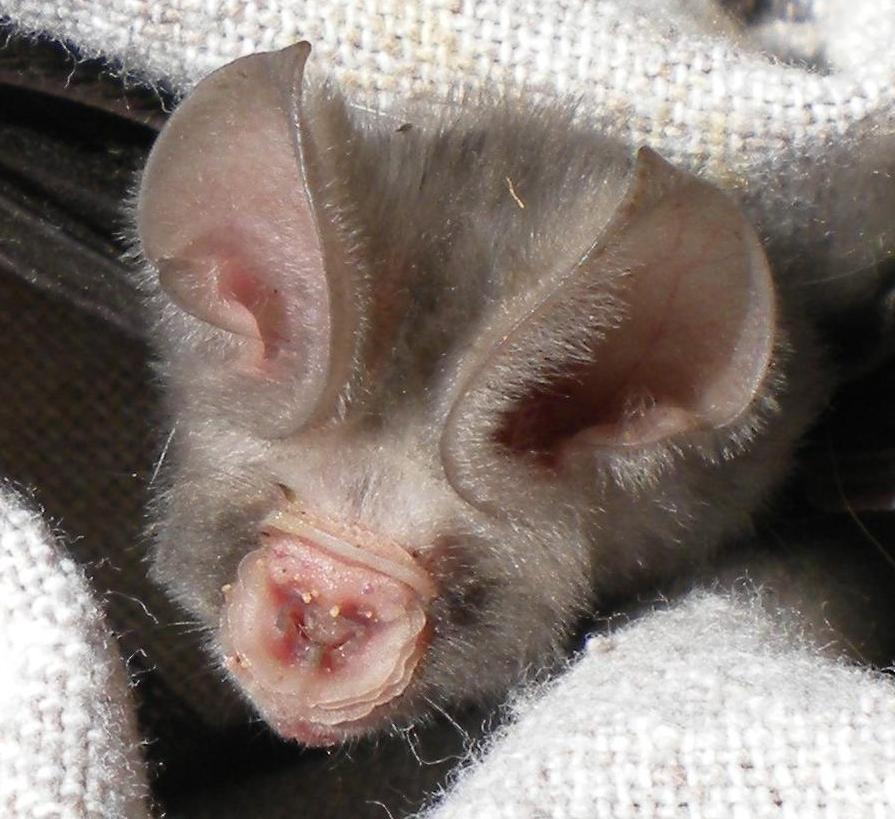
Sundevall's roundleaf bat

The bats' most distinguishing feature is that their forelimbs are developed as wings, making them the only mammals capable of flight. Bat species account for about 20% of all mammals.

- Family: Vespertilionidae
  - Subfamily: Myotinae
    - Genus: Myotis
      - Long-fingered bat, M. capaccinii VU
      - Geoffroy's bat, M. emarginatus LC
      - Whiskered bat, M. mystacinus LC
      - Zenati myotis, M. zenatius LC
      - Felten's myotis, M. punicus DD
  - Subfamily: Vespertilioninae
    - Genus: Barbastella
      - Western barbastelle, B. barbastellus NT
    - Genus: Eptesicus
      - Serotine bat, E. serotinus LC
    - Genus: Hypsugo
      - Savi's pipistrelle, H. savii LC
    - Genus: Nyctalus
      - Greater noctule bat, N. lasiopterus VU
      - Lesser noctule, N. leisleri LC
    - Genus: Otonycteris
      - Desert long-eared bat, O. hemprichii LC
    - Genus: Pipistrellus
      - Egyptian pipistrelle, P. deserti LC
      - Kuhl's pipistrelle, P. kuhlii LC
      - Common pipistrelle, P. pipistrellus LC
      - Rüppell's pipistrelle, P. rueppelli LC
    - Genus: Plecotus
      - Mediterranean long-eared bat, P. kolombatovici LC
  - Subfamily: Miniopterinae
    - Genus: Miniopterus
      - Common bent-wing bat, M. schreibersii VU
- Family: Rhinopomatidae
  - Genus: Rhinopoma
    - Egyptian mouse-tailed bat, R. cystops LC
    - Lesser mouse-tailed bat, R. hardwickei LC
    - Greater mouse-tailed bat, R. microphyllum LC
- Family: Molossidae
  - Genus: Tadarida
    - Egyptian free-tailed bat, T. aegyptiaca LC
    - European free-tailed bat, T. teniotis LC
- Family: Emballonuridae
  - Genus: Taphozous
    - Naked-rumped tomb bat, T. nudiventris LC
- Family: Nycteridae
  - Genus: Nycteris
    - Egyptian slit-faced bat, N. thebaica LC
- Family: Rhinolophidae
  - Subfamily: Rhinolophinae
    - Genus: Rhinolophus
      - Blasius's horseshoe bat, R. blasii LC
      - Mediterranean horseshoe bat, R. euryale NT
      - Greater horseshoe bat, R. ferrumequinum LC
      - Mehely's horseshoe bat, R. mehelyi VU
  - Subfamily: Hipposiderinae
    - Genus: Asellia
      - Trident leaf-nosed bat, A. tridens LC
    - Genus: Hipposideros
      - Sundevall's roundleaf bat, H. caffer LC

== Order: Cetacea (whales) ==
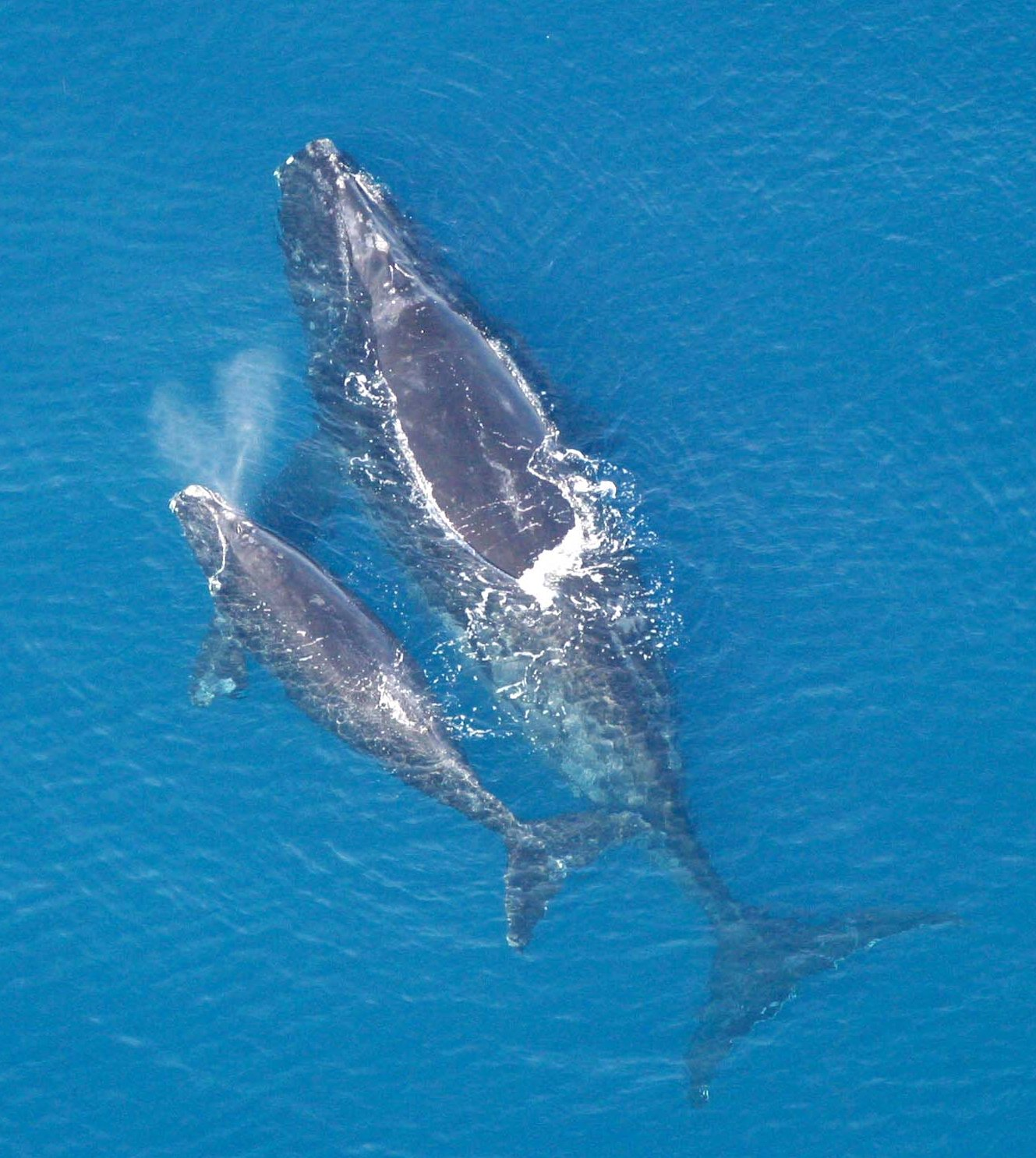
Female North Atlantic right whale and calf

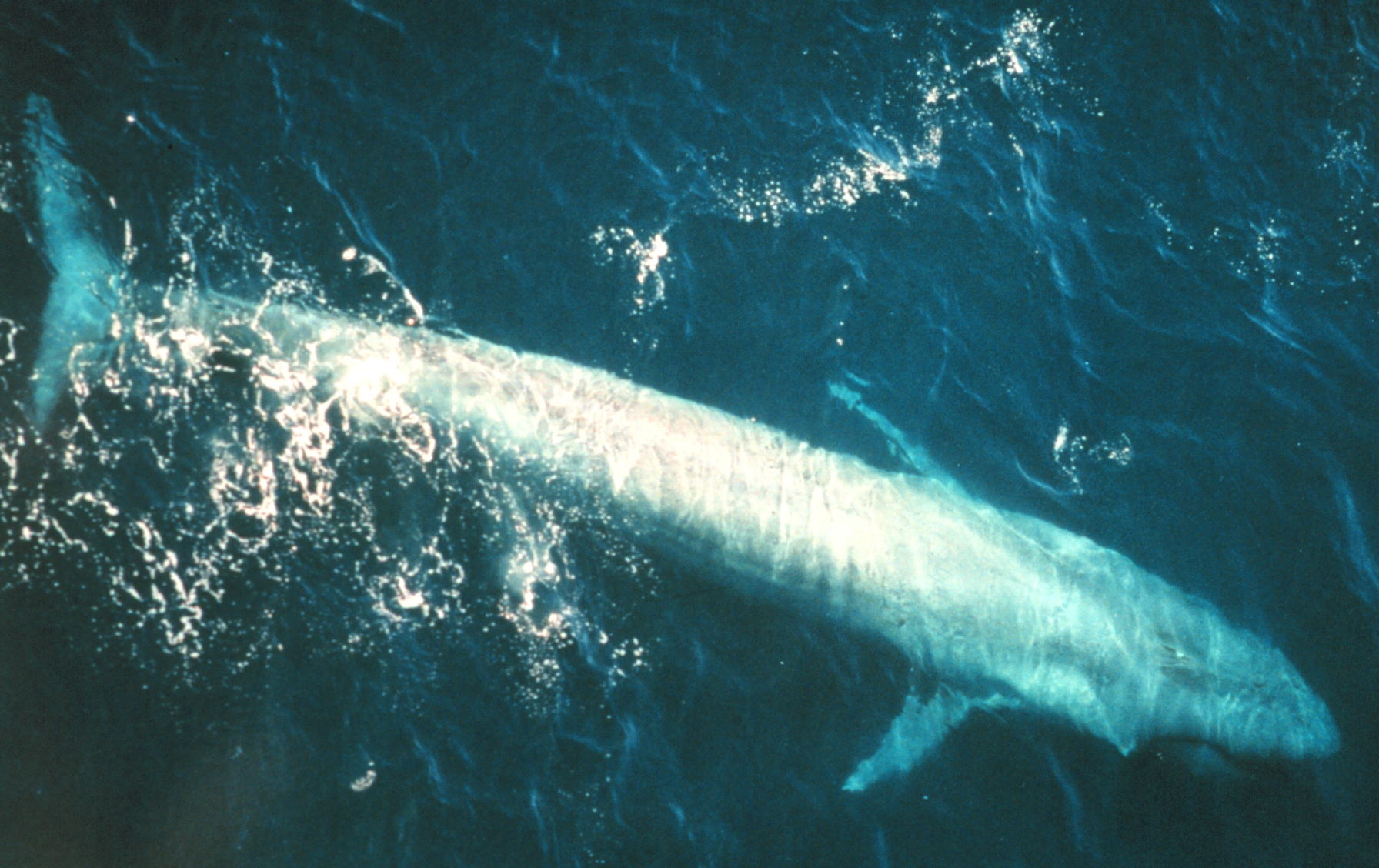
Blue whale

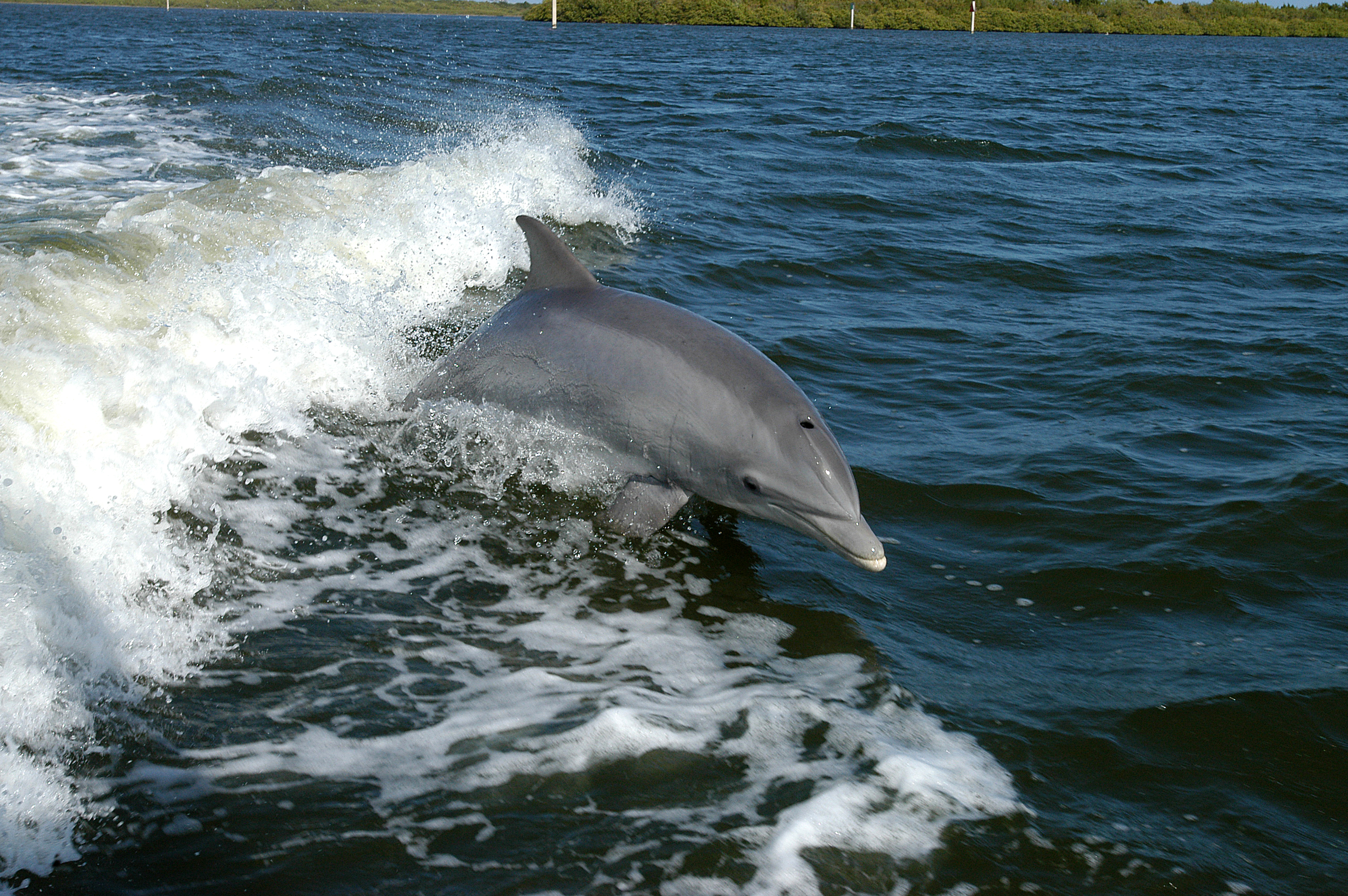
Common bottlenose dolphin

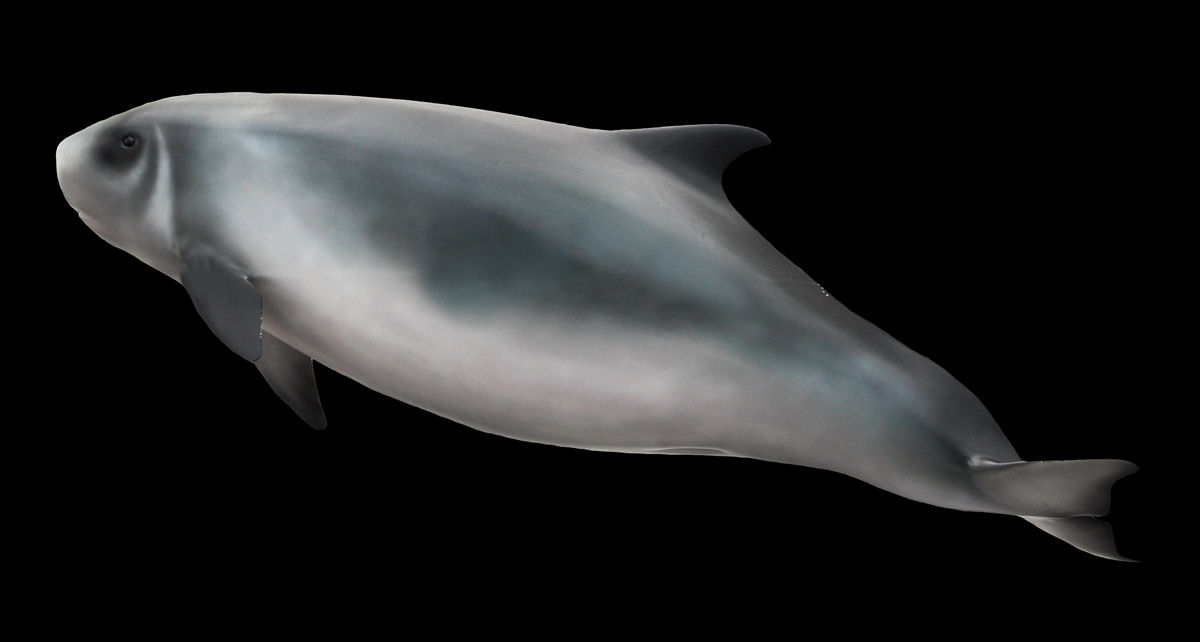
Dwarf sperm whale

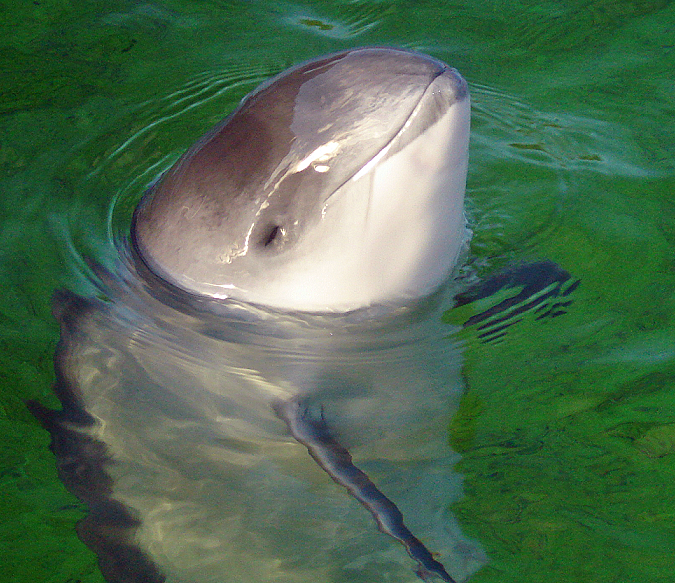
Harbour porpoise

The order Cetacea includes whales, dolphins and porpoises. They are the mammals most fully adapted to aquatic life with a spindle-shaped nearly hairless body, protected by a thick layer of blubber, and forelimbs and tail modified to provide propulsion underwater.

- Suborder: Mysticeti
  - Family: Balaenidae (right whales)
    - Genus: Eubalaena
      - North Atlantic right whale, E. glacialis CR
  - Family: Balaenopteridae (rorquals)
    - Genus: Balaenoptera
      - Northern minke whale, Balaenoptera acutorostrata LC
      - Sei whale, Balaenoptera borealis EN
      - Bryde's whale, Balaenoptera edeni DD
      - Blue whale, Balaenoptera musculus EN
      - Fin whale, Balaenoptera physalus VU
    - Genus: Megaptera
      - Humpback whale, Megaptera novaengliae LC
- Suborder: Odontoceti
  - Family: Delphinidae (pilot whales and dolphins)
    - Genus: Delphinus
      - Short-beaked common dolphin, Delphinus delphis LC
    - Genus: Globicephala
      - Short-finned pilot whale, Globicephala macrorhynchus DD
      - Long-finned pilot whale, Globicephala melas DD
    - Genus: Grampus
      - Risso's dolphin, Grampus griseus DD
    - Genus: Lagenodelphis
      - Fraser's dolphin, Lagenodelphis hosei LC
    - Genus: Orcinus
      - Orca, Orcinus orca DD
    - Genus: Pseudorca
      - False killer whale, Pseudorca crassidens DD
    - Genus: Feresa
      - Pygmy killer whale, Feresa attenuata DD
    - Genus: Stenella
      - Striped dolphin, Stenella coeruleoalba LC
      - Atlantic spotted dolphin, Stenella frontalis DD
    - Genus: Steno
      - Rough-toothed dolphin, Steno bredanensis LC
    - Genus: Tursiops
      - Common bottlenose dolphin, Tursiops truncatus LC
  - Family: Kogiidae (small sperm whales)
    - Genus: Kogia
      - Pygmy sperm whale, Kogia breviceps DD
      - Dwarf sperm whale, Kogia sima DD
  - Family: Phocoenidae (porpoises)
    - Genus: Phocoena
      - Harbour porpoise, Phocoena phocoena LC
  - Family: Physeteridae (sperm whales)
    - Genus: Physeter
      - Sperm whale, Physeter macrocephalus VU
  - Family: Ziphiidae (beaked whales)
    - Genus: Hyperoodon
      - Northern bottlenose whale, Hyperoodon ampullatus DD
    - Genus: Mesoplodon
      - Sowerby's beaked whale, Mesoplodon bidens DD
      - Blainville's beaked whale, Mesoplodon densirostris DD
      - Gervais' beaked whale, Mesoplodon europaeus DD
      - True's beaked whale, Mesoplodon mirus DD
    - Genus: Ziphius
      - Cuvier's beaked whale, Ziphius cavirostris DD

== Order: Carnivora (carnivorans) ==
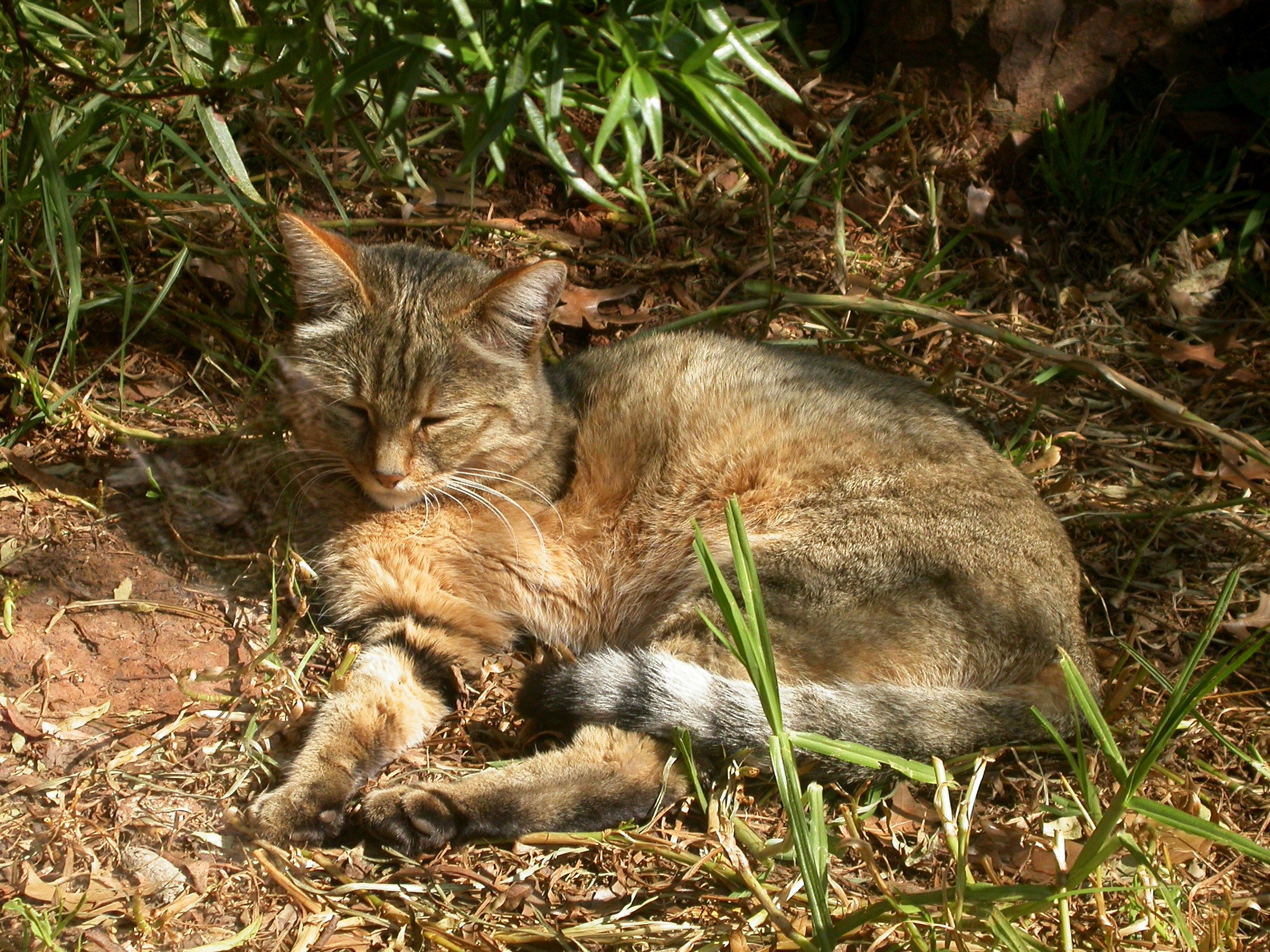
African wildcat

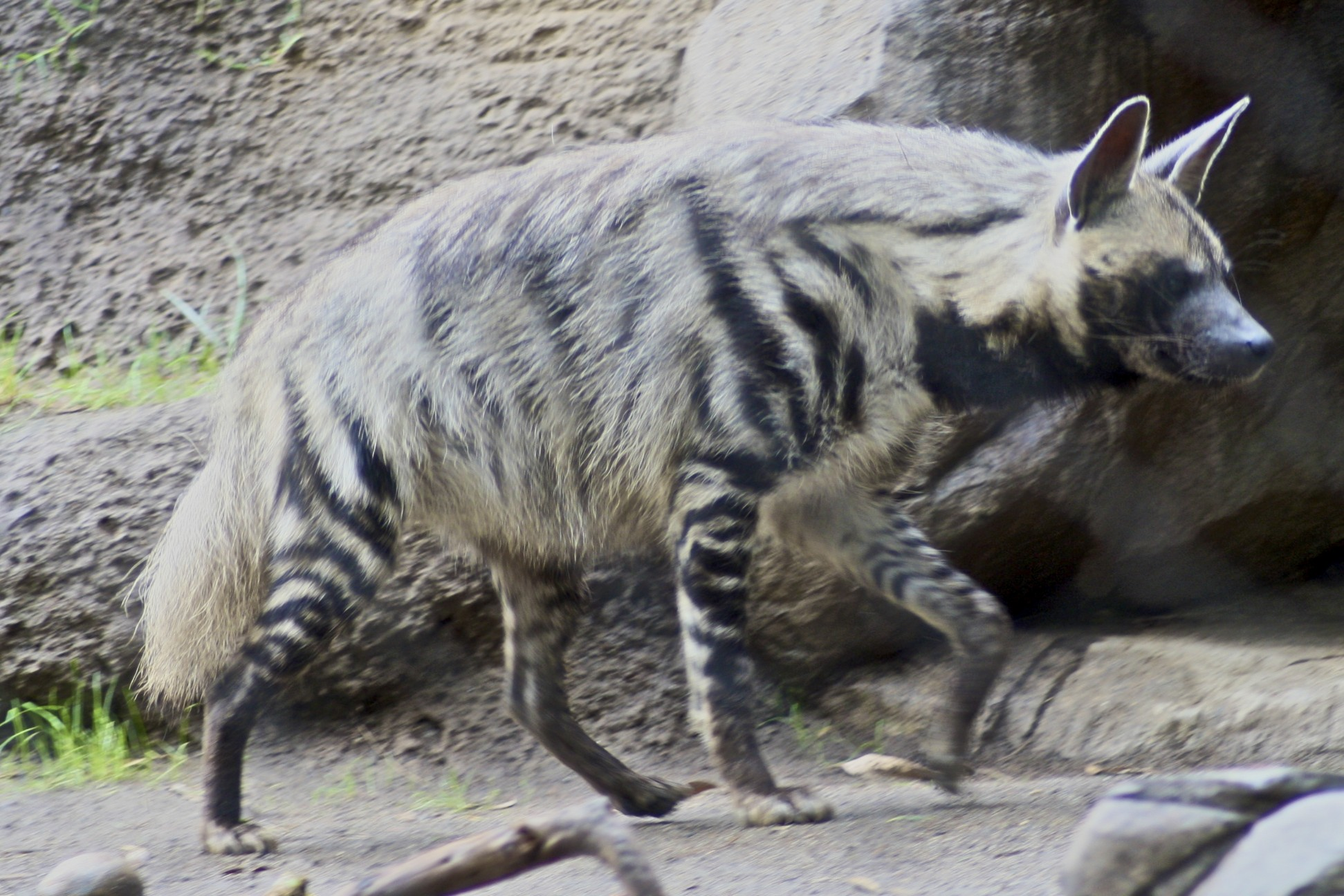
Striped hyena

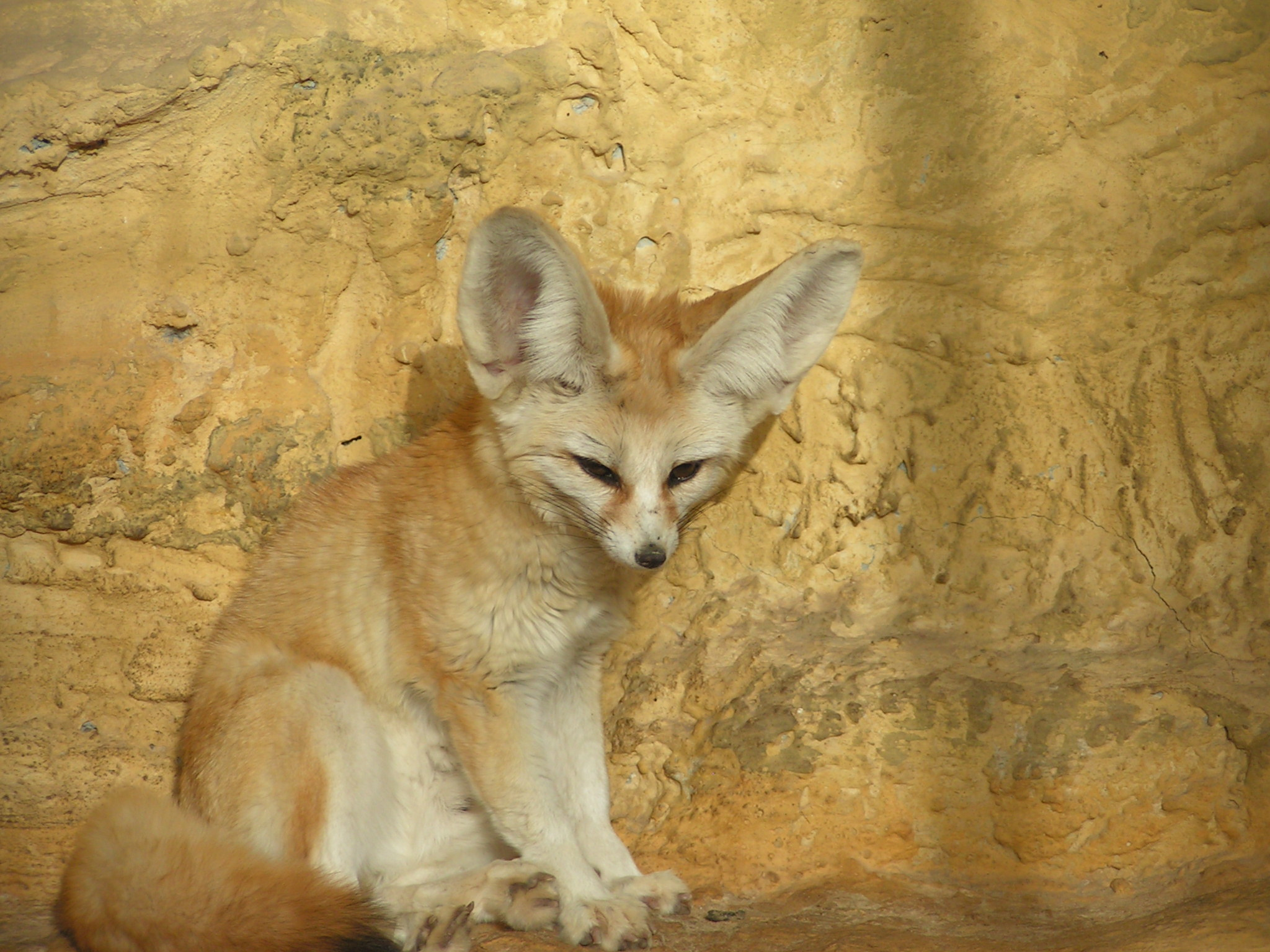
Fennec fox

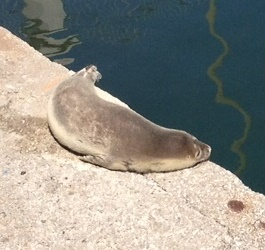
Mediterranean monk seal

There are over 260 species of carnivorans, the majority of which feed primarily on meat. They have a characteristic skull shape and dentition.

- Suborder: Feliformia
  - Family: Felidae (cats)
    - Subfamily: Felinae
      - Genus: Caracal
        - Caracal, C. caracal LC
      - Genus: Felis
        - African wildcat, F. lybica LC
        - Sand cat, F. margarita LC presence uncertain
      - Genus: Leptailurus
        - Serval, L. serval LC
  - Family: Viverridae
    - Subfamily: Viverrinae
      - Genus: Genetta
        - Common genet, G. genetta LC
  - Family: Herpestidae (mongooses)
    - Genus: Herpestes
      - Egyptian mongoose, H. ichneumon LC
  - Family: Hyaenidae (hyaenas)
    - Genus: Hyaena
      - Striped hyena, H. hyaena NT
- Suborder: Caniformia
  - Family: Canidae (dogs, foxes)
    - Genus: Canis
      - African wolf, C. lupaster LC
    - Genus: Vulpes
      - Rüppell's fox, V. rueppellii LC
      - Red fox, V. vulpes LC
      - Fennec fox, V. zerda LC
  - Family: Mustelidae (mustelids)
    - Genus: Ictonyx
      - Saharan striped polecat, Ictonyx libyca LC
    - Genus: Lutra
      - European otter, L. lutra NT
    - Genus: Mellivora
      - Honey badger, M. capensis LC
    - Genus: Mustela
      - Least weasel, M. nivalis LC
      - European polecat, M. putorius LC
  - Family: Phocidae (earless seals)
    - Genus: Monachus
      - Mediterranean monk seal, M. monachus VU presence uncertain

== Order: Artiodactyla (even-toed ungulates) ==
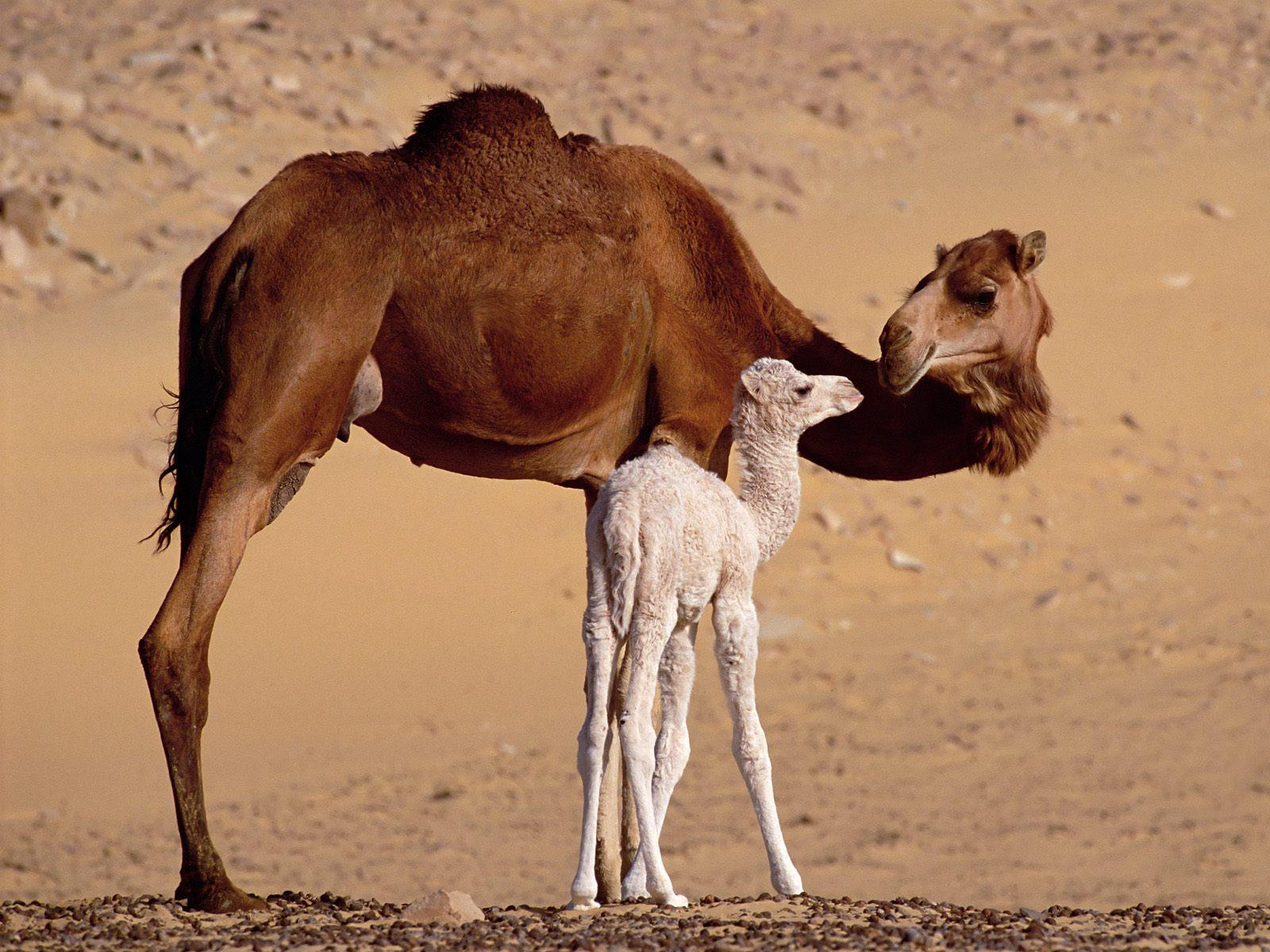
Dromedaries in Tarfaya

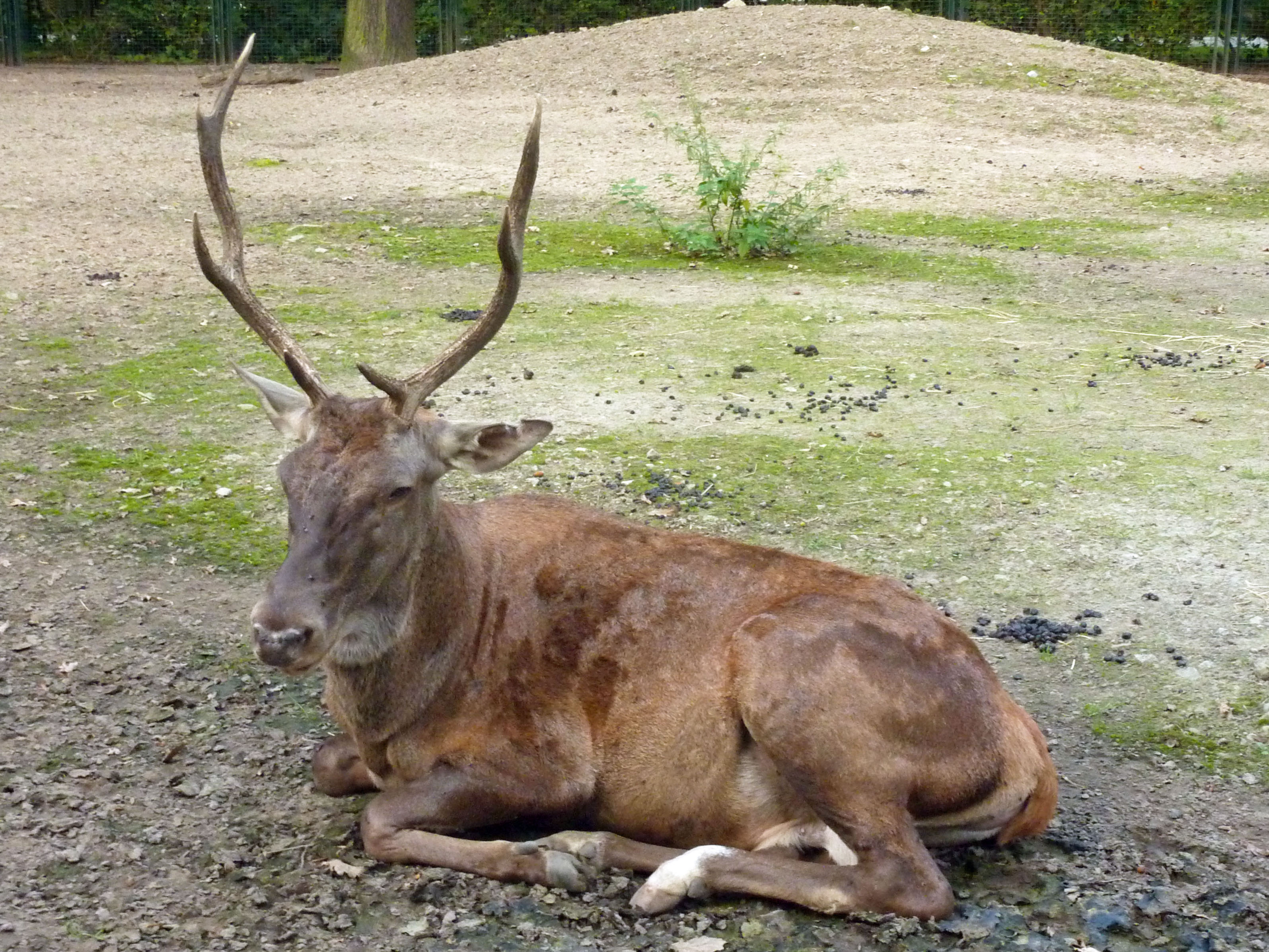
The Barbary stag is the only deer native to Africa

The even-toed ungulates are ungulates whose weight is borne about equally by the third and fourth toes, rather than mostly or entirely by the third as in perissodactyls. There are about 220 artiodactyl species, including many that are of great economic importance to humans.

- Family: Suidae (pigs)
  - Subfamily: Suinae
    - Genus: Sus
      - Wild boar, S. scrofa LC
        - North African boar, S. s. algira
- Family: Cervidae (deer)
  - Subfamily: Cervinae
    - Genus: Cervus
      - Red deer, C. elaphus LC
        - Barbary stag, C. e. barbarus
- Family: Bovidae (cattle, antelope, sheep, goats)
  - Subfamily: Antilopinae
    - Genus: Gazella
      - Cuvier's gazelle, G. cuvieri VU
      - Dorcas gazelle, G. dorcas EN
  - Subfamily: Caprinae
    - Genus: Ammotragus
      - Barbary sheep, A. lervia VU
  - Subfamily: Hippotraginae
    - Addax, A. nasomaculatus CR reintroduced

== Globally and locally extinct ==
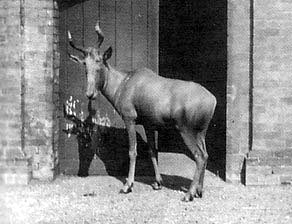
Bubal hartebeest, 1895

The following species or subspecies are globally extinct:

- Atlas bear, Ursus arctos crowtheri EX (1870)
- Barbary leopard, Panthera pardus pardus EX (1996)
- Atlas wild ass, Equus africanus atlanticus EX (c. 300 AD)
- Bubal hartebeest, Alcelaphus buselaphus buselaphus EX (1925)
- North African elephant, Loxodonta africana pharaohensis EX (c. 400 AD)

The following species or subspecies are locally extinct in Morocco, but continue to exist elsewhere or in captivity:

- Barbary lion, Panthera leo leo EW
- Cheetah, Acinonyx jubatus VU
- Dama gazelle, Nanger dama CR possibly extirpated
- Scimitar oryx, Oryx dammah EN
- Northern giraffe, Giraffa camelopardalis VU

== See also ==
- Lists of mammals by region
- List of chordate orders
- List of prehistoric mammals
- Mammal classification
- List of mammals described in the 2000s
