= Achillea santolina =

Scientific classification
- Kingdom: Plantae
- Clade: Embryophytes
- Clade: Tracheophytes
- Clade: Angiosperms
- Clade: Eudicots
- Clade: Asterids
- Order: Asterales
- Family: Asteraceae
- Genus: Achillea
- Species: A. santolina

Binomial name
- Achillea santolina L.

Species of yarrow

Achillea santolina, a perennial herb, is commonly found in arid environments of Iraq and Jordan, but may colonize colder and more humid climates of the northern hemisphere, such as Europe and Asia. It is a traditional plant used as a herbal remedy in many parts of Iraq and Jordan and has been used as an insecticide and repellent.

== Botany ==
Achillea santolina is a perennial herb, typically 15–30 cm tall with erect, ascending stems. The plant is characterized with green leaves that exhibit segments branched into three flat and ovular, serrated lobules. The heads of the plant are clusters of flowers with proportionally longer stalks, forming radiate and slightly convex heads. The plants typically grow on the edge of cultivated lands during their flowering period of March to April.

== Chemical constituents ==
Achillea santolina mainly contains a high level of flavonoids and sesquiterpene lactones. The species also produces alkaloids, saponins, resins, tannins, sterols, carbohydrates and a volatile oil. Specifically, the extract of Achillea santolina contains chemical constituents such as santoflavone, artemetin, a- santonin, b- sitosterol, lupeol, and leukodin.

=== Essential oil ===
The essential oils of Achillea santolina are made up of various components and the chemical concentration of the essential oil of the dry Achilles santolina ranges from 0.11 to 0.20% between genotypes of the species. Of the components, camphor and 1,8 cineole are the major compounds found in plant's essential oils. The main constituents of the essential oil are found to be 1,8 cineole (17.6%), camphor (17.5%), 4-terpineol (7.0%), P-cymene (3.5%), trans-sabinene hydrate (2.7%), and alpha-terpineol (2.5%) [2]. Other compounds present are alpha-pinene, camphene, linalool, chrysanthenone, borneol, chrusanthenylactate, thymol, eugenol, and beta-eudesmol. Additionally, the hydrodistilled oil of Achillea santolina contains 54 volatile components; of the fifty-four, the major components are fragranol, fragranyl acetate, 1,8-cineole, and terpine-4-ol.

== Uses ==
=== Medicinal ===
Achillea santolina is under research for its health effects and has supposed uses in traditional medicine for minor ailments. In Iraq and Jordan, an infusion of the leaves of Achillea santolina is used for intestinal complications such as intestinal colics, dysentery, and often used as a flatulence reliever. In Turkey, the plant is traditionally used to treat abdominal pain, stomach-aches, and for the treatment of superficial wounds.

Pharmacological studies of Achillea santolina presented its antimicrobial, antioxidant, spasmolytic, antiulcer, antitumor, choleretic, antidiuretic, antidiabetic, and anti-inflammatory capabilities. Externally, the plant has been used to treat skin inflammation and skin irritation associated with various conditions in forms of a sitz bath and a compress. Additionally, the dried aerial parts of the plant are traditionally used to treat symptoms of the common cold.

=== Insect repellent ===
With current research. insecticidal and repellent activities of the aerial parts of Achillea santolina are attributed to the oil content of the plant. Domestic flies and honeybees displayed a significant response to the plant's insecticidal and repellent activities. However, there has not been much study on its insecticidal and repellent effects on other organisms. Additionally, there has not been further research on determining the active constituents responsible for the plant's insecticidal and repellent properties.
