= List of ecoregions in Morocco =

The following is a list of ecoregions in Morocco, according to the Worldwide Fund for Nature (WWF). This list does not include the ecoregions of Western Sahara (see List of ecoregions in Western Sahara).

== Terrestrial ecoregions ==
=== Palearctic ===
==== Mediterranean forests, woodlands, and scrub ====
- Mediterranean dry woodlands and steppe
- Mediterranean woodlands and forests
- Mediterranean acacia-argania dry woodlands and succulent thickets

==== Temperate coniferous forests ====
- Mediterranean conifer and mixed forests

==== Montane grasslands and shrublands ====
- Mediterranean High Atlas juniper steppe

==== Deserts and xeric shrublands ====
- North Saharan steppe and woodlands

== Freshwater ecoregions ==
- Permanent Maghreb
- Temporary Maghreb

== Marine ecoregions ==
- Alboran Sea
- Saharan Upwelling
