= Somabrachys nisseni =

Scientific classification
- Kingdom: Animalia
- Phylum: Arthropoda
- Clade: Pancrustacea
- Class: Insecta
- Order: Lepidoptera
- Genus: Somabrachys
- Species: S. nisseni

Binomial name
- Somabrachys nisseni Powell, 1916

Species of moth

Somabrachys nisseni is a moth in the Somabrachyidae family. It was described by Powell in 1916.
