= Somabrachys dubar =

Scientific classification
- Kingdom: Animalia
- Phylum: Arthropoda
- Clade: Pancrustacea
- Class: Insecta
- Order: Lepidoptera
- Genus: Somabrachys
- Species: S. dubar

Binomial name
- Somabrachys dubar Powell, 1907

Species of moth

Somabrachys dubar is a moth in the Somabrachyidae family. It was described by Powell in 1907.
