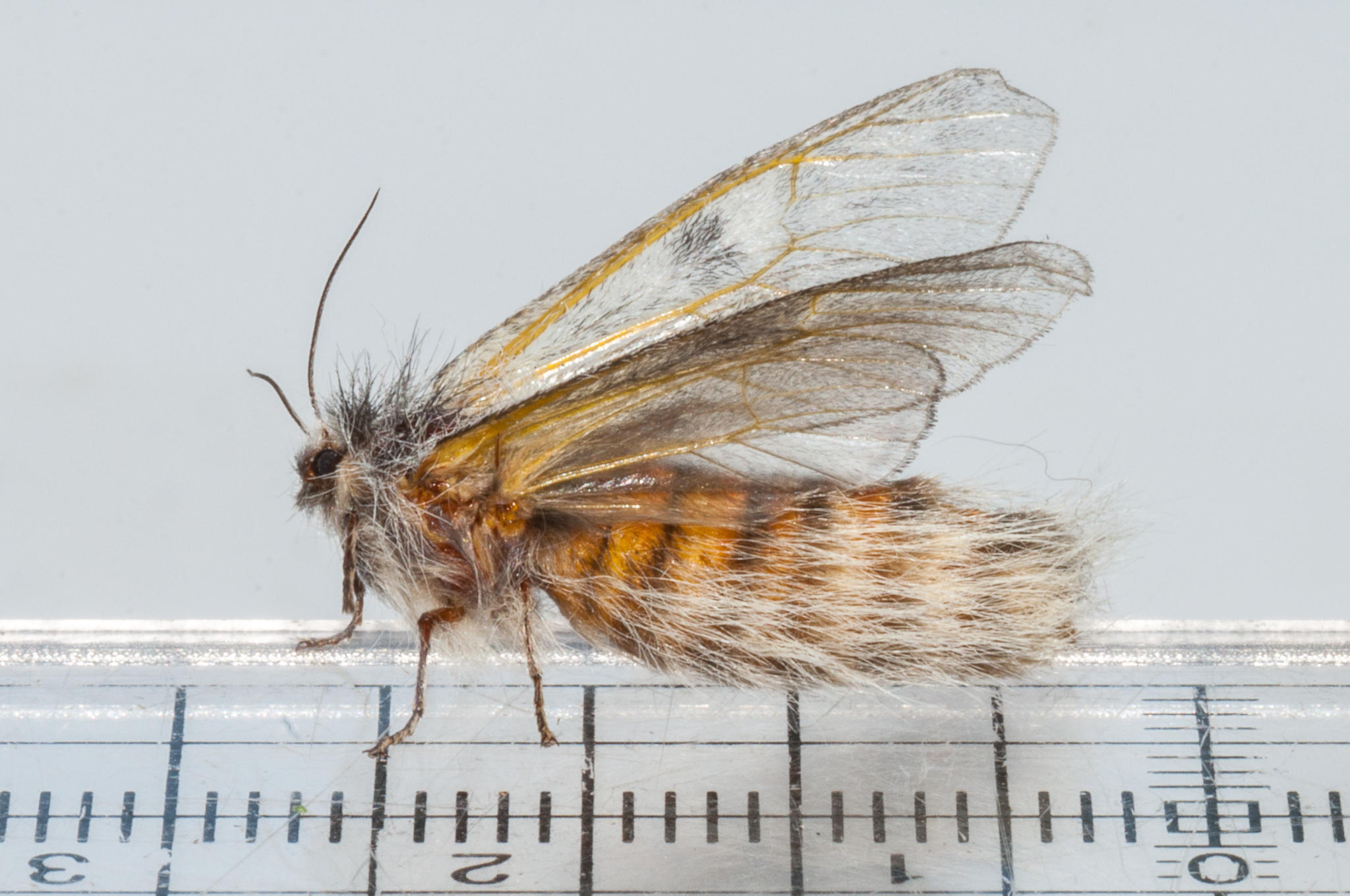
- Adult
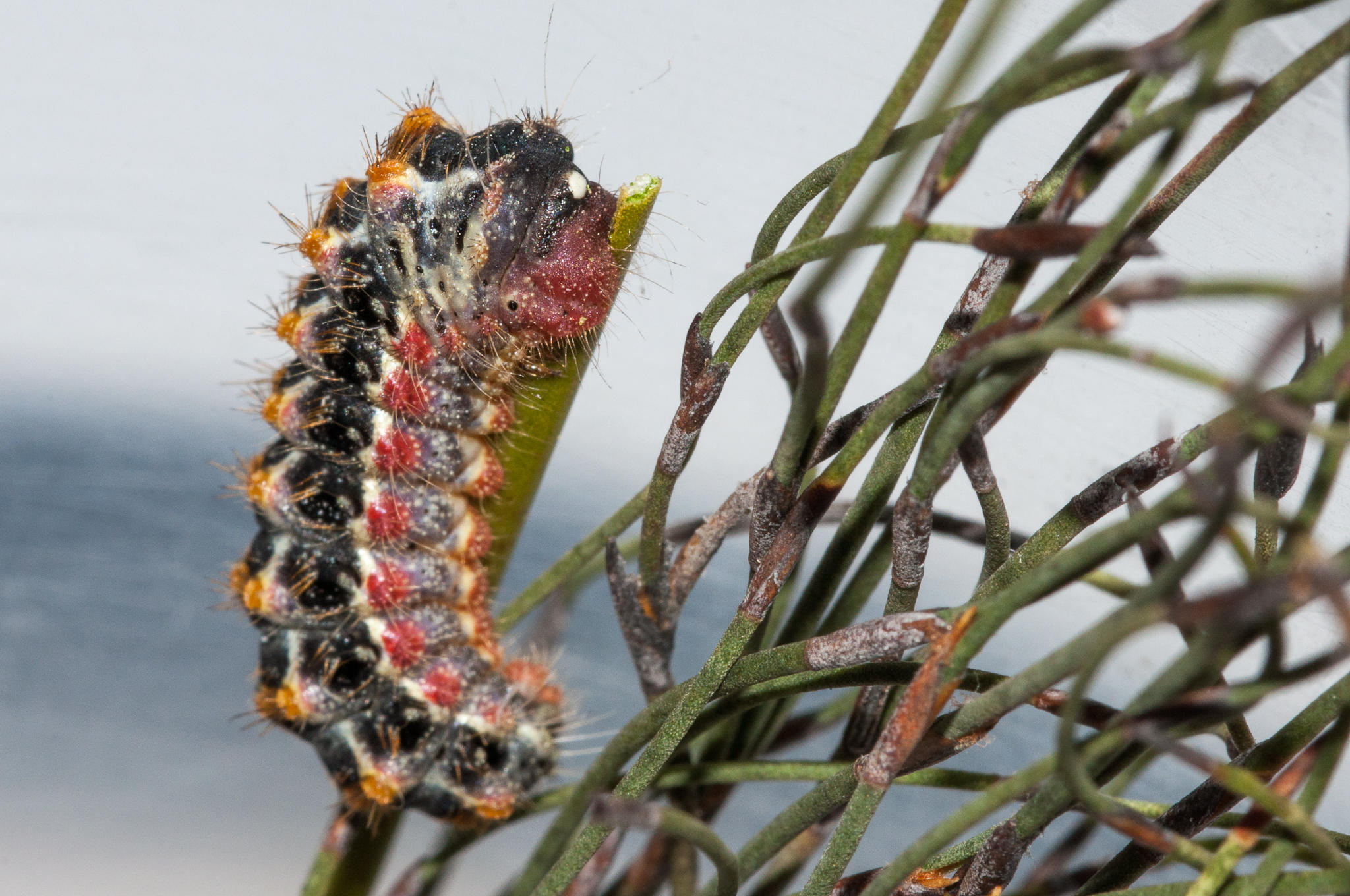
- Larvae

Scientific classification
- Kingdom: Animalia
- Phylum: Arthropoda
- Class: Insecta
- Order: Lepidoptera
- Family: Somabrachyidae
- Genus: Psycharium
- Species: P. kammanassiense

Binomial name
- Psycharium kammanassiense Geertsema, 1998

= Psycharium kammanassiense =

Species of moth

Psycharium kammanassiense is a species of moth of the family Somabrachyidae. It is found in South Africa.
