= Climate of Morocco =

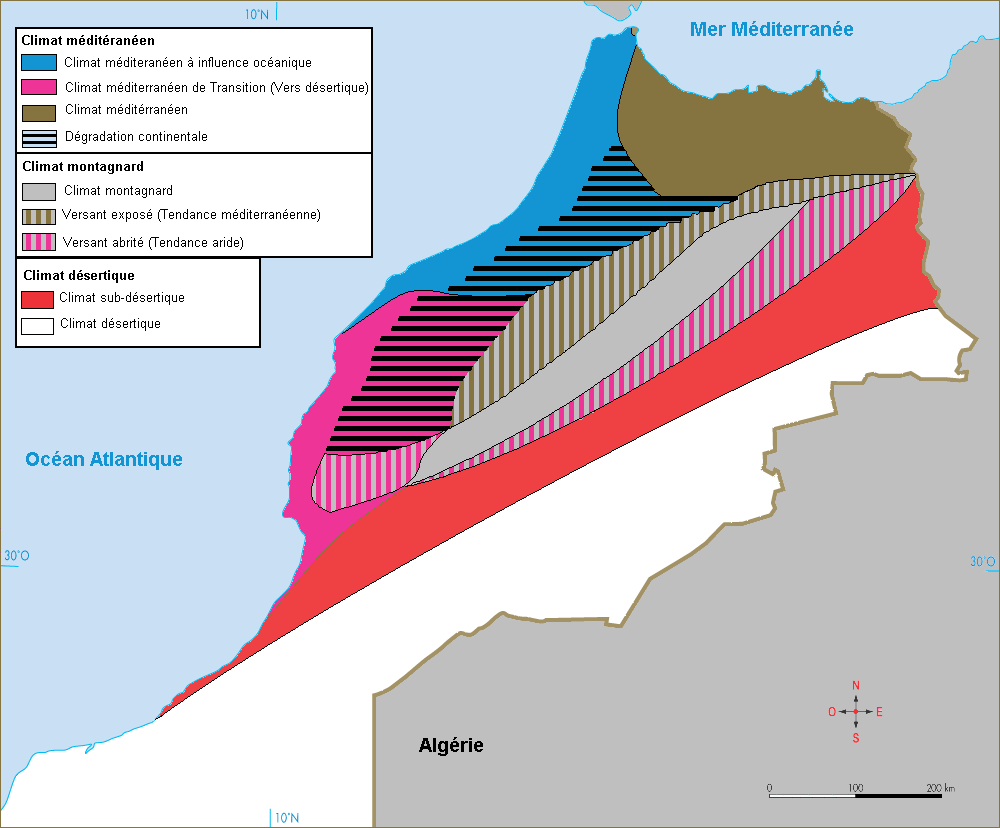
Climate map of Morocco.

The climate of Morocco can be divided into seven sub-zones, determined by the different influences affecting the country: oceanic, Mediterranean, mountain, continental, and desert influences.

== Northern Atlantic plains ==
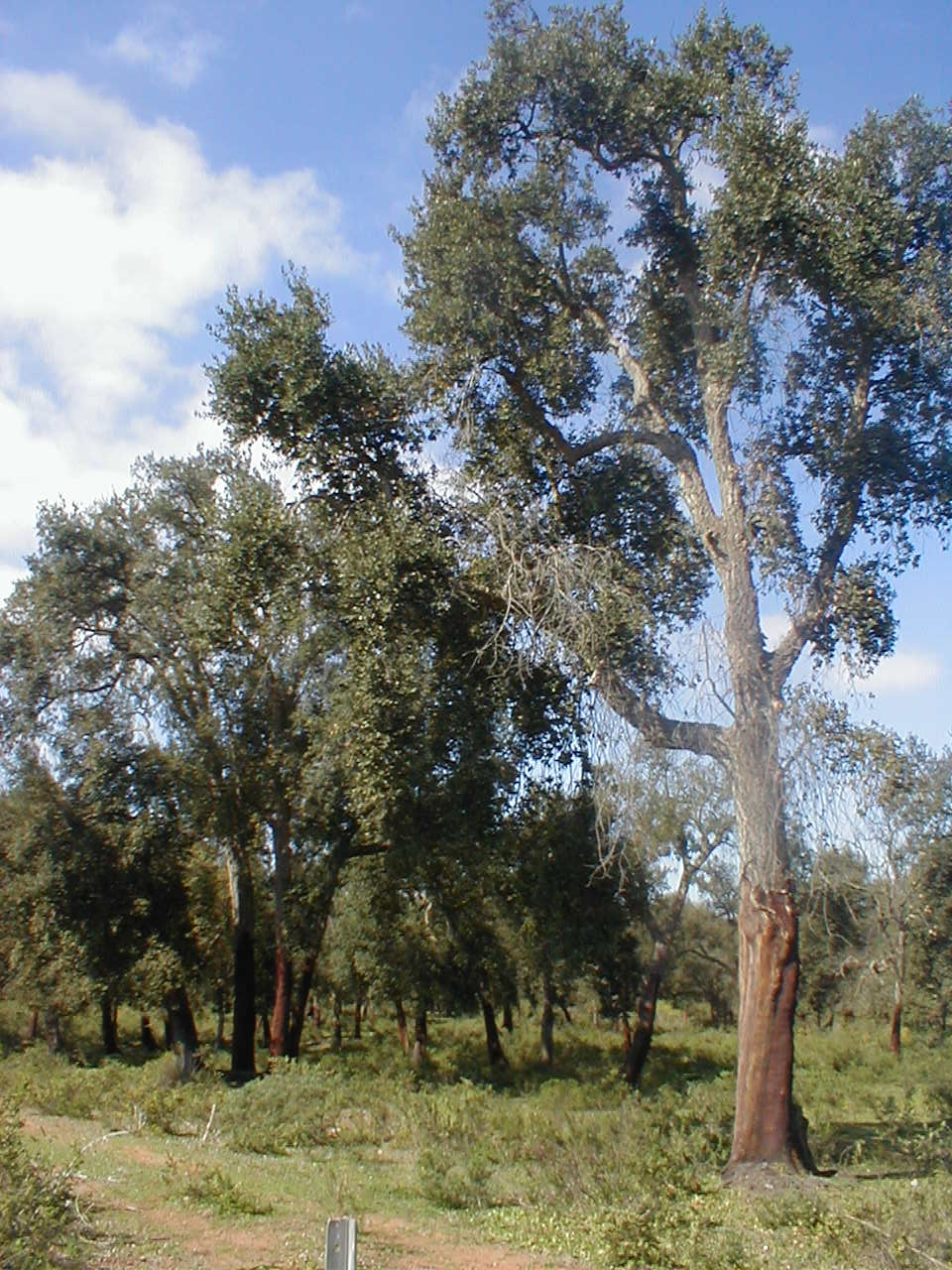
Maâmora Forest (near Rabat)

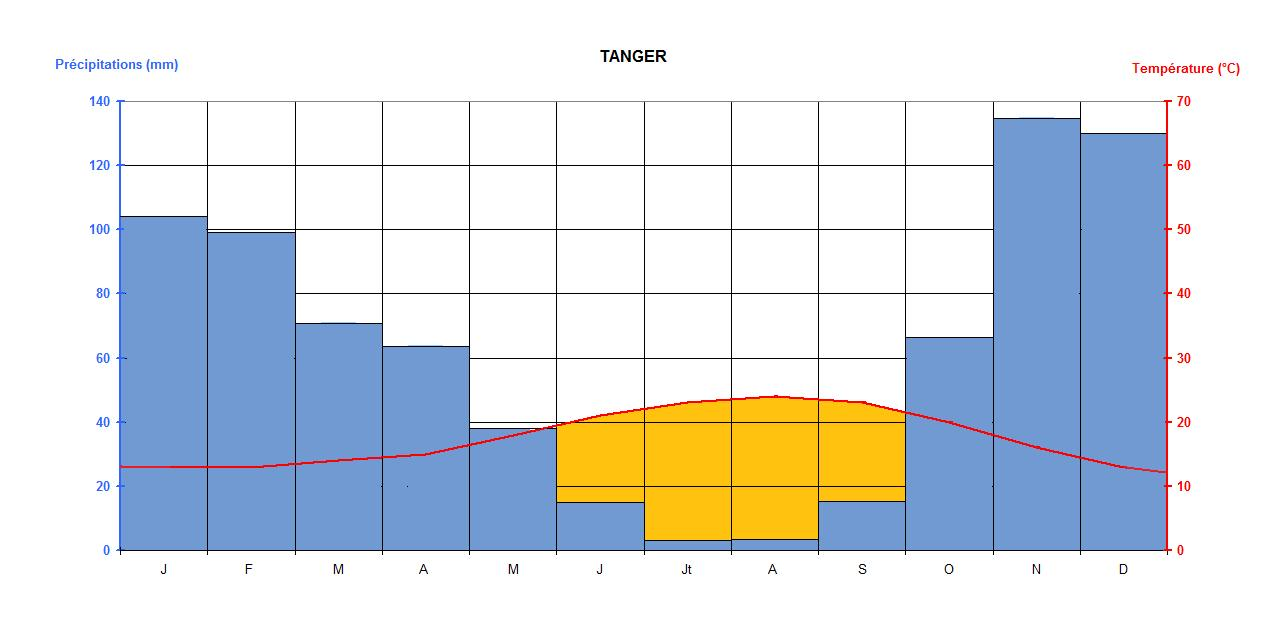
Ombrothermic diagram for Tangier

This zone roughly corresponds to the Atlantic coastline stretching from the Tangier Peninsula to El Jadida. It experiences a Mediterranean climate with strong oceanic influence. The region is heavily affected by Atlantic disturbances during the rainy season, which begins in October and may last until May in the far north. Summers are dry and sunny, though morning fog banks and nocturnal dew are frequent.

Precipitation varies greatly from north to south, decreasing by nearly half. Annual rainfall exceeds 810 millimetres (32 in) in Tangier and around 800 mm in Asilah, 740 mm in Larache, 630 mm in Kenitra, 570 mm in Rabat, and about 450 mm in Casablanca. Temperatures are relatively uniform due to Atlantic currents, resulting in mild winters and temperate summers. Average January temperatures range from 12–13 °C (54–55 °F), while summer averages are around 23 °C (73 °F), with heatwaves being relatively rare.

This climate favors agriculture, notably in the Gharb plain and the Loukkos basin. Vegetation includes forests of holm oak, cork oak, and eucalyptus.

Tangier
Month	J	F	M	A	M	J	Jl	A	S	O	N	D
Temperature (°C)	13	13	14	15	18	21	23	24	23	20	16	13
Precipitation (mm)	104	99	71	64	38	15	3	3	15	66	135	130

== From the Doukkala plains to the Souss basin ==
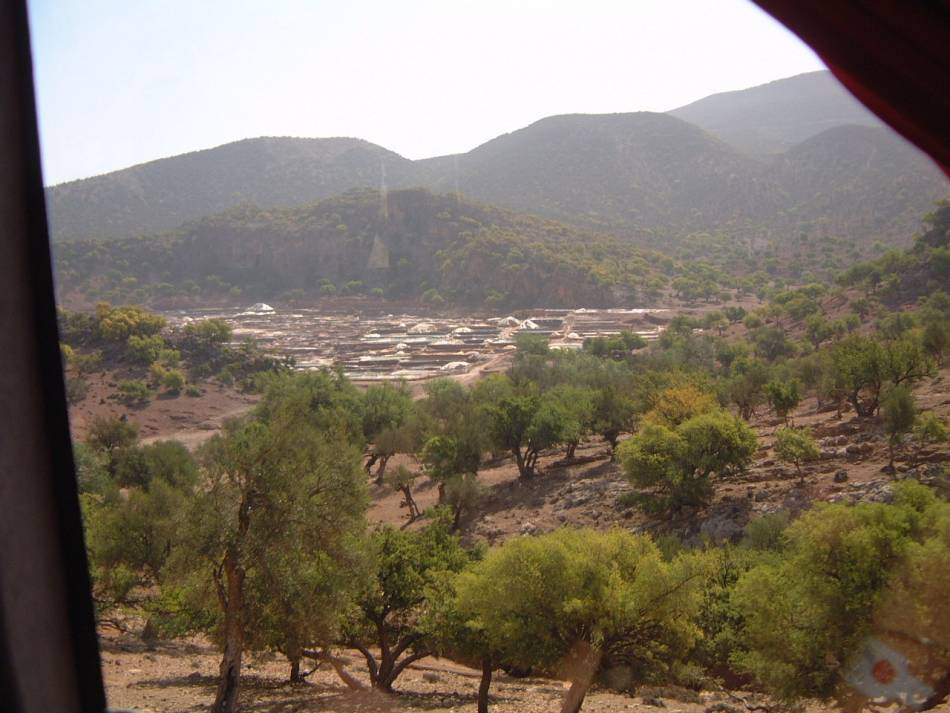
Argan forest between Essaouira and Agadir

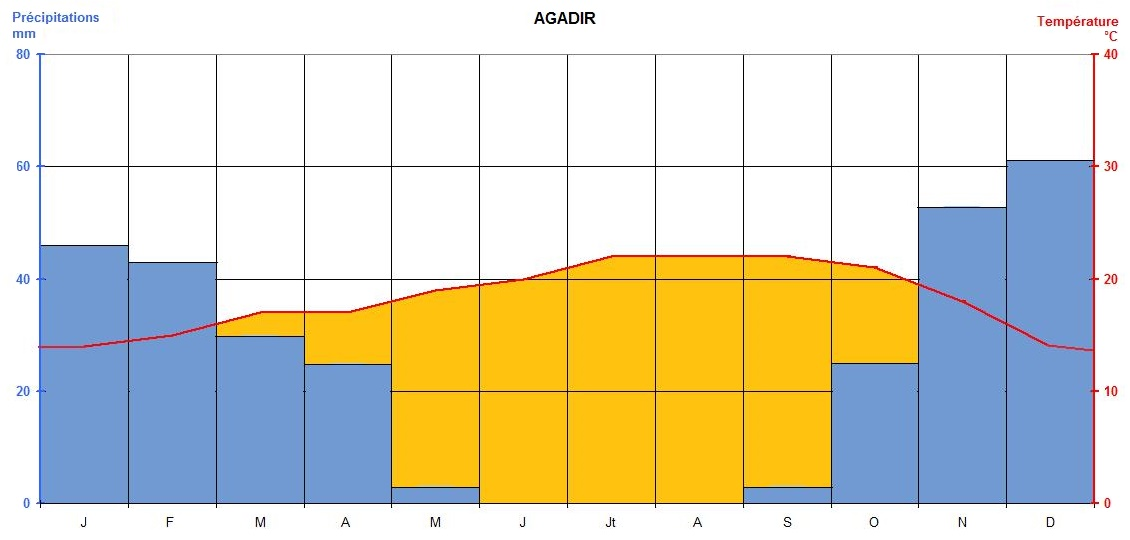
Ombrothermic diagram for Agadir

This zone extends from Safi to south of Agadir. It includes the Doukkala plain, the coast of Essaouira, and the Souss basin. The climate is a drier continuation of the northern Atlantic plains, with increasing aridity southward due to Saharan influence.

Annual rainfall averages about 400 mm in Safi, 300 mm in Essaouira, and 270 mm in Agadir. The rainy season lasts less than six months and is concentrated between November and March. Fog and dew are frequent, and sunshine is exceptional, exceeding 300 sunny days per year in Agadir.

Temperatures are moderated year-round by the trade winds, ranging from 14–16 °C (57–61 °F) in January to 19–22 °C (66–72 °F) in July. Occasionally, hot Saharan air (Chergui) can raise temperatures above 40 °C (104 °F).

The region is home to the endemic argan tree, as well as extensive citrus cultivation in the Souss plain.

Agadir
Month	J	F	M	A	M	J	Jl	A	S	O	N	D
Temperature (°C)	14	15	17	17	19	20	22	22	22	21	18	14
Precipitation (mm)	46	43	30	25	3	0	0	0	3	25	53	61

== Interior plateaus ==
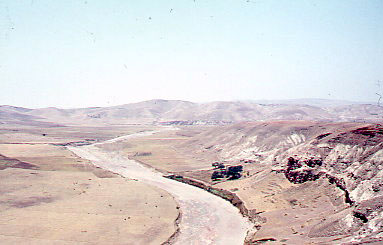
Tensift Valley (Central Plateau)

This crescent-shaped zone stretches from Fez in the northeast to Marrakesh in the southwest and includes the plains and plateaus of Saïss, Chaouia, Abda, and Haouz. It represents a more continental version of the coastal climates.

Rainfall reaches 500–600 mm annually in Fez and Meknes (up to 650 mm in Sefrou), but drops below 350 mm south of Settat, with only about 280 mm in Marrakesh. Continentality results in low humidity and large thermal amplitudes, both daily and seasonal. Winter averages range from 9–11 °C (48–52 °F), while summer averages reach 26–28 °C (79–82 °F), with frequent frosts in winter and extreme heat in summer.

Northern landscapes resemble the Spanish Meseta, while southern areas become steppe-like. Viticulture is common in the north, while olive cultivation dominates the south.

Marrakesh
Month	J	F	M	A	M	J	Jl	A	S	O	N	D
Temperature (°C)	12	14	16	18	21	24	28	28	26	21	17	13
Precipitation (mm)	28	30	36	33	18	8	3	3	8	20	38	28

== Mediterranean coast and the Rif ==
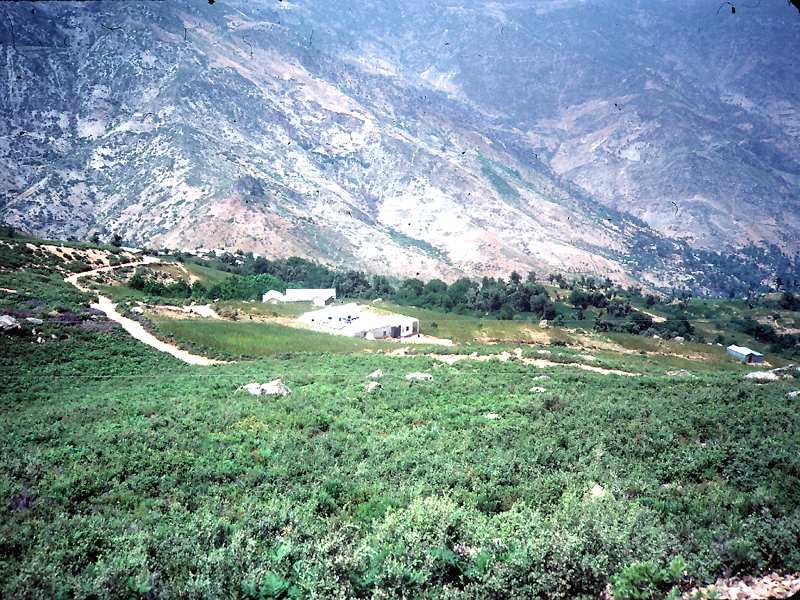
Rif Mountains

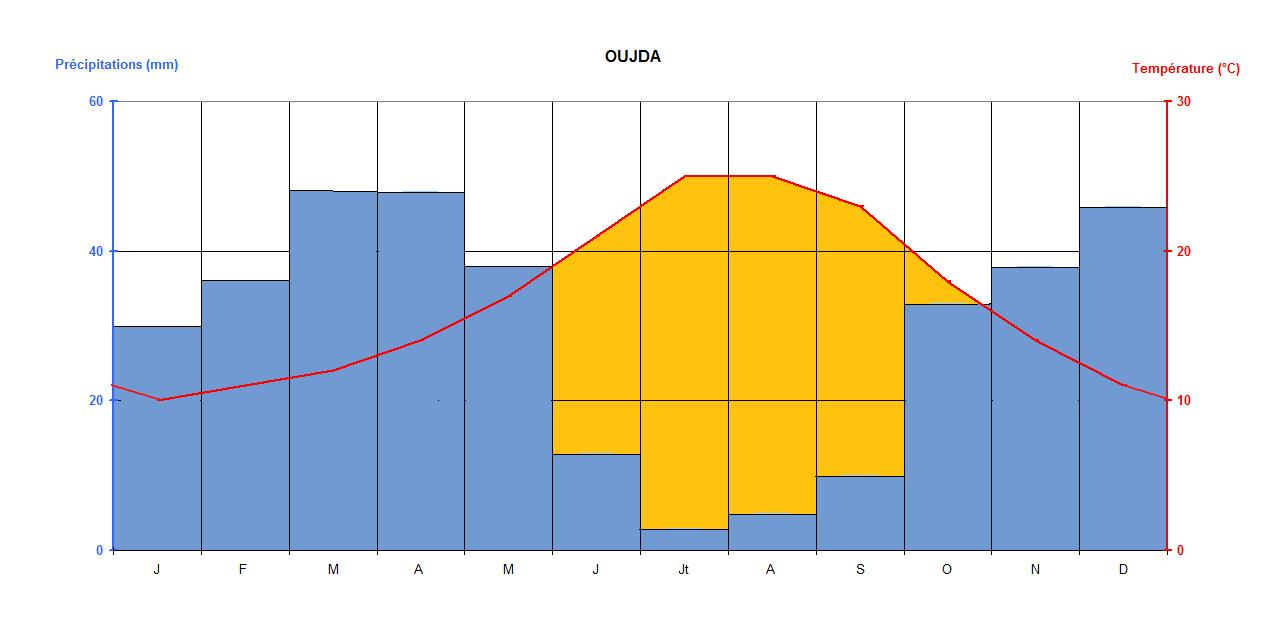
Ombrothermic diagram for Oujda

This region includes the Mediterranean coast and the mountainous hinterland of the Rif (over 2,000 m). The coastal climate is typically Mediterranean, with mild, moderately wet winters and hot, dry summers. In the mountains, precipitation can exceed 1,500 mm annually, with snowfall and cool winter temperatures.

Average rainfall is around 700 mm in Ouezzane, 750 mm in Tetouan, and over 1,200 mm in Chefchaouen. Western areas are wetter due to Atlantic exposure, while eastern areas near Al Hoceima and Oujda receive only 350–400 mm annually over a 30-year period.

Vegetation is lush, with pine forests near the coast and holm oak, cedar, and even fir trees inland. The region is also known for cannabis cultivation.

Oujda
Month	J	F	M	A	M	J	Jl	A	S	O	N	D
Temperature (°C)	10	11	12	14	17	21	25	25	23	18	14	11
Precipitation (mm)	30	36	48	48	38	13	3	5	10	33	38	46

== Middle and High Atlas ==
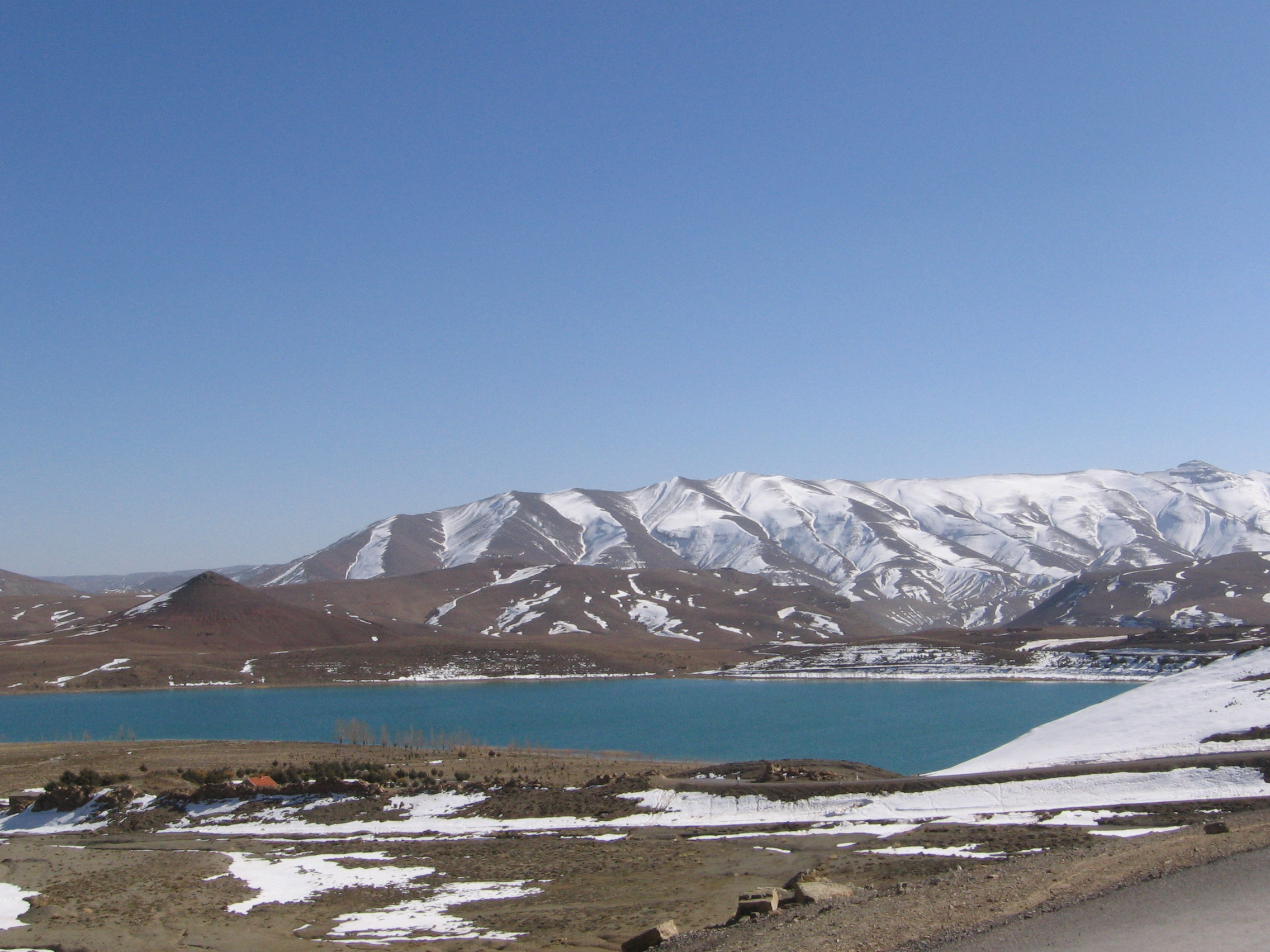
Lake Tislit in the High Atlas

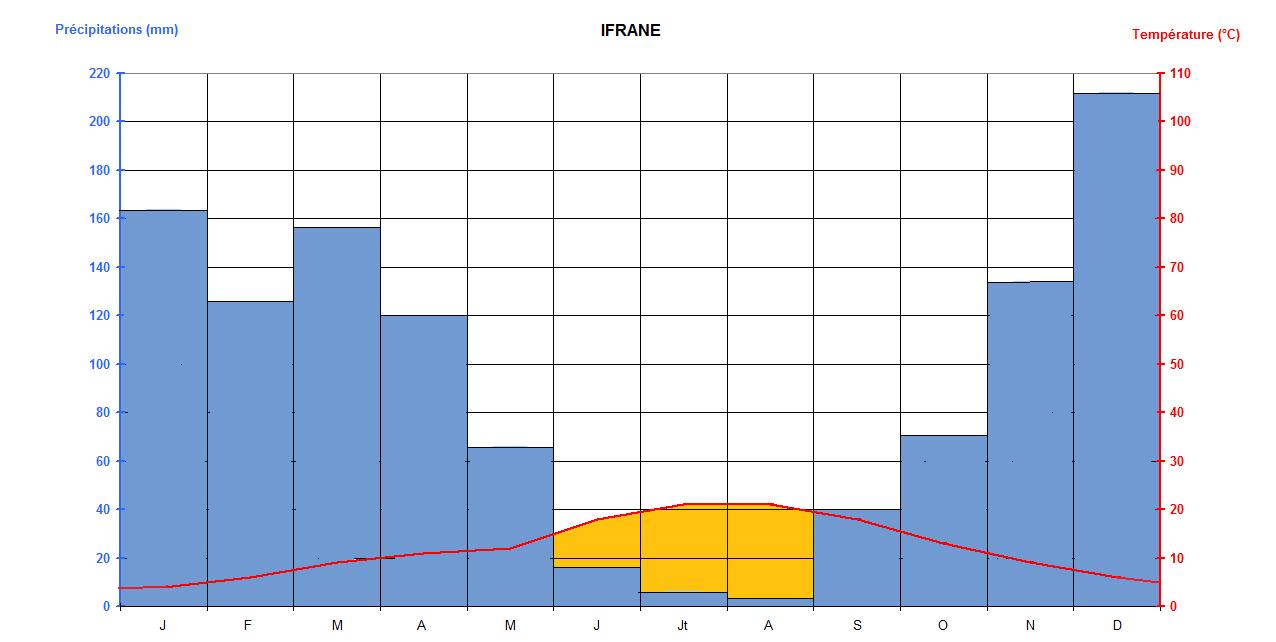
Ombrothermic diagram for Ifrane

The Middle Atlas and High Atlas form a southwest–northeast mountain chain ranging from 2,500 to over 4,000 m, culminating at Mount Toubkal (4,165 m), the highest peak in North Africa. These mountains separate Mediterranean Morocco from desert Morocco.

The climate is mountainous, with strong oceanic and Mediterranean influence on northern slopes and Saharan influence on southern slopes. Annual precipitation ranges from 1,000 to 1,500 mm in the Middle Atlas (1,200 mm in Ifrane) and 600–900 mm in the High Atlas, dropping to 400–500 mm on sheltered slopes. Snowfall is heavy in winter and can persist until May. Summer thunderstorms are frequent.

Winter temperatures can fall to −18 °C (0 °F), while summer averages hover around 20 °C (68 °F).

The region is exceptionally biodiverse, featuring cedar forests in the Middle Atlas and oak and Aleppo pine in the High Atlas, along with juniper, thuya, carob, and Atlas pistachio trees. Most of Morocco’s rivers originate in these mountains.

Ifrane
Month	J	F	M	A	M	J	Jl	A	S	O	N	D
Temperature (°C)	1.9	3.9	6.7	9.2	12.6	17.9	21.3	20.8	18.1	13.2	7.2	3.0
Precipitation (mm)	164	126	156	120	66	16	6	3	40	70	134	212

== Anti-Atlas and pre-Saharan valleys ==
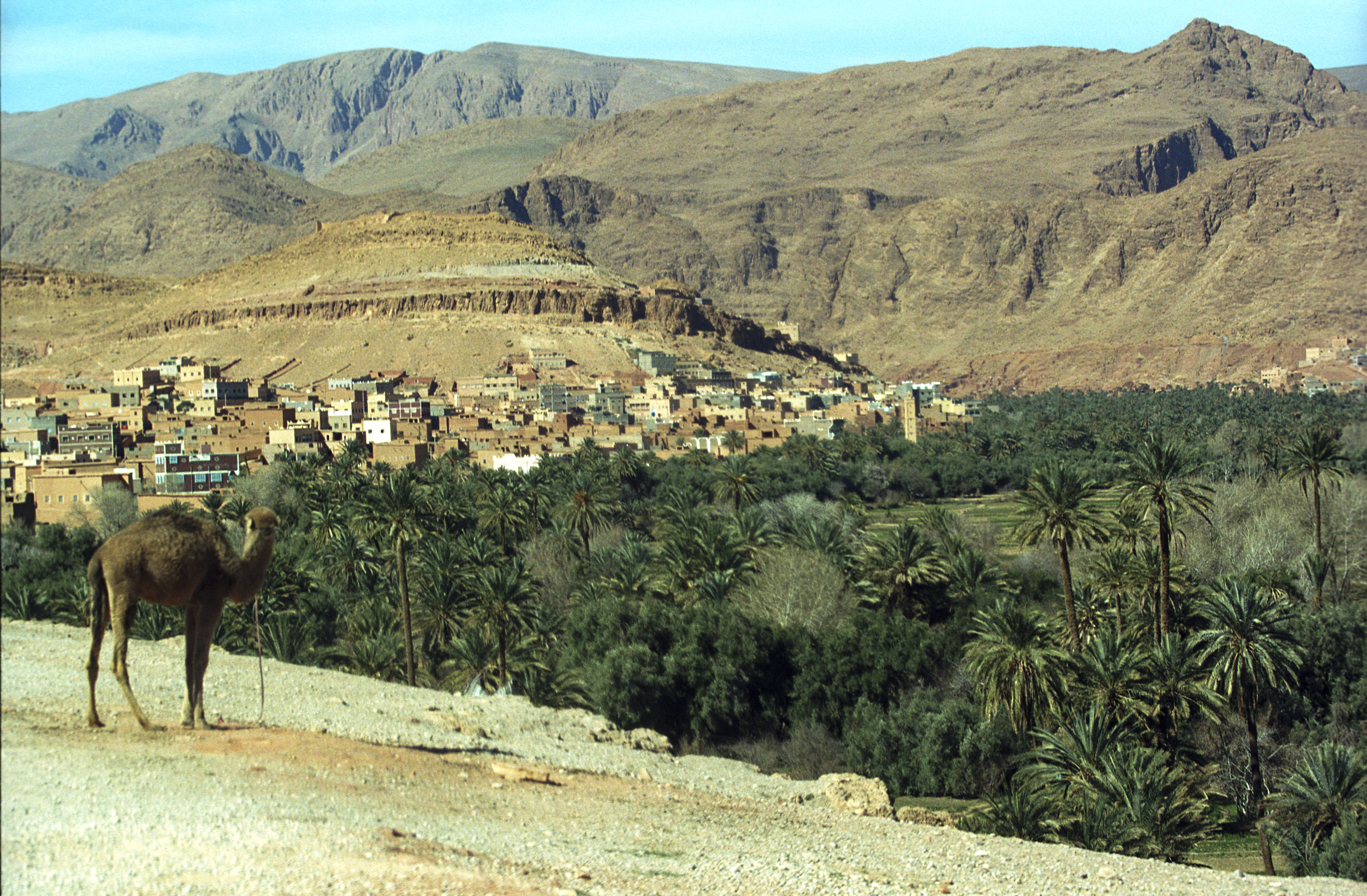
Todra Valley, southern Morocco

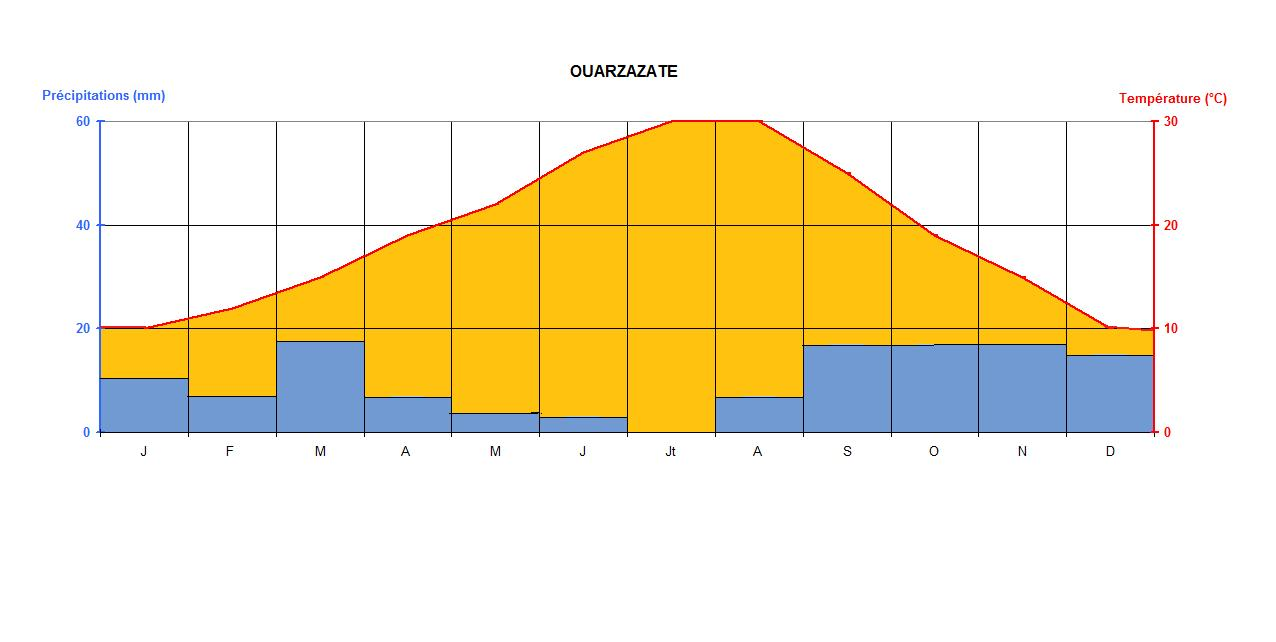
Ombrothermic diagram for Ouarzazate

This zone includes the southern foothills of the Middle and High Atlas and the Anti-Atlas. The climate is desert with mountainous influence. Annual precipitation ranges from 100 to 200 mm (about 120 mm in Ouarzazate).

Average winter temperatures range from 6–11 °C (43–52 °F), while summer averages reach 27–32 °C (81–90 °F). Altitude increases continentality, making winters cooler and summers less extreme than in lower Saharan areas.

Vegetation is mainly steppe, except along valleys and wadis where oasis agriculture has developed (e.g., Dades Valley, Draa Valley).

Ouarzazate
Month	J	F	M	A	M	J	Jl	A	S	O	N	D
Temperature (°C)	10	12	15	19	22	27	30	30	25	19	15	10
Precipitation (mm)	10	7	17	7	4	3	0	7	17	17	17	15

== Saharan domain ==
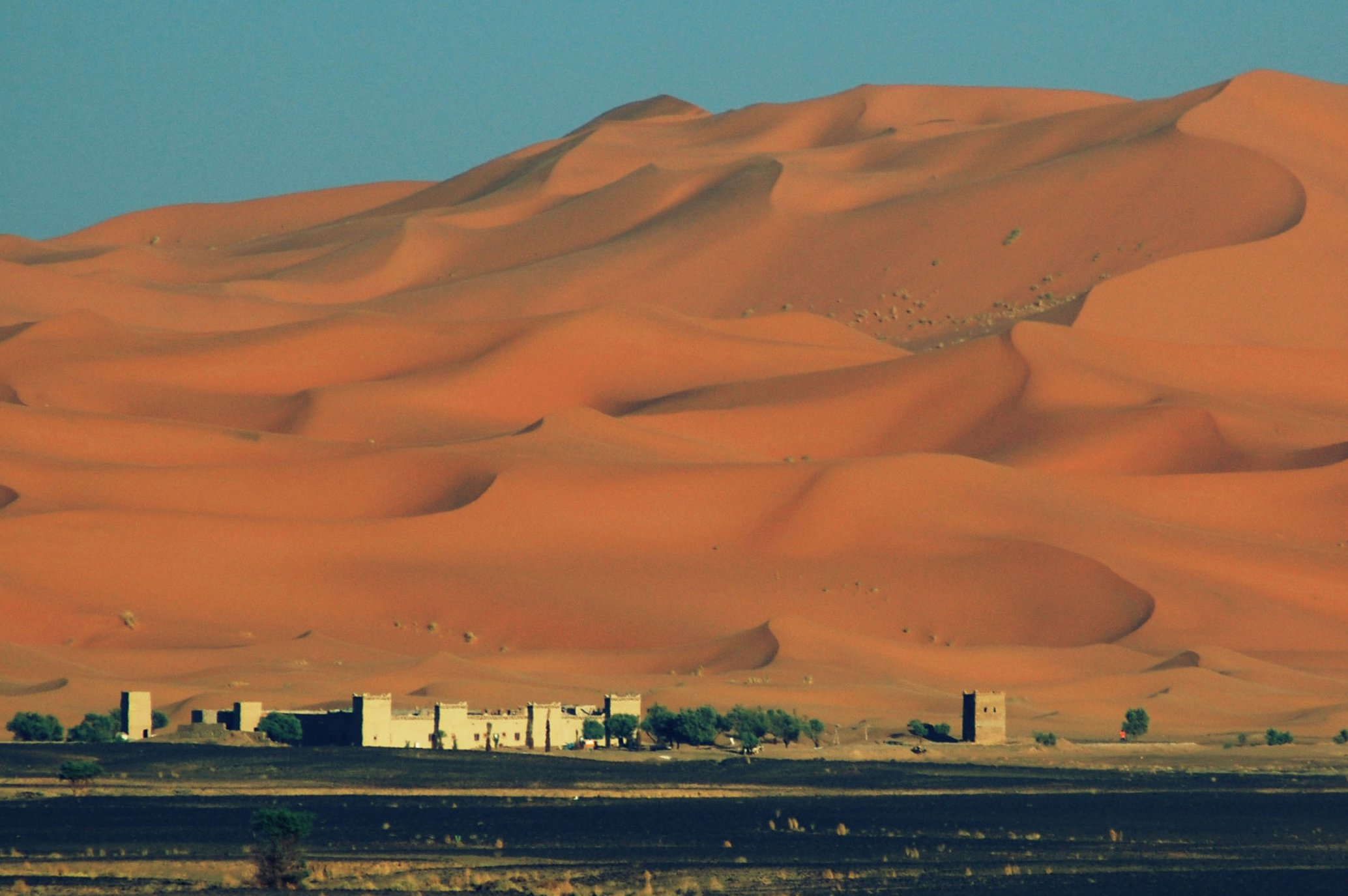
Merzouga dunes, near Erfoud

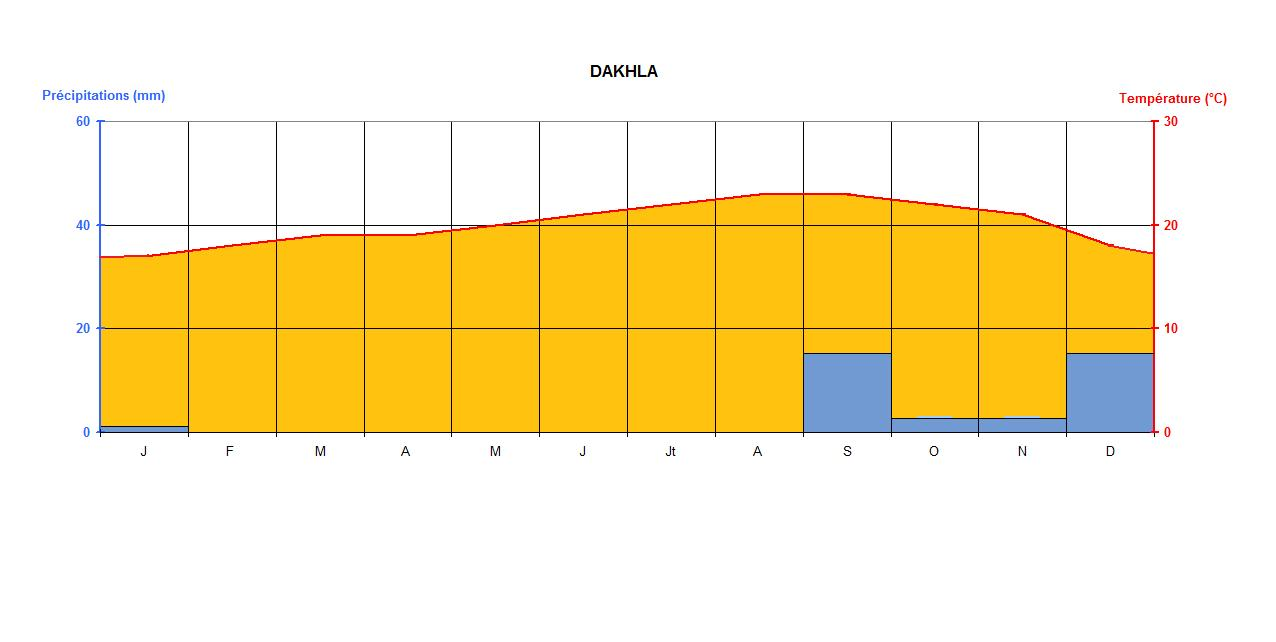
Ombrothermic diagram for Dakhla

South of the Atlas Mountains lies the Saharan domain, characterized by an arid desert climate, extremely low rainfall, intense sunshine, long hot summers, and mild winters. Annual precipitation is generally below 100 millimetres (3.9 in) (61 mm in Zagora, 59 mm in Merzouga, 33 mm in Dakhla).

In inland areas, summer maximums can exceed 44 °C (111 °F), while coastal Western Sahara experiences much smaller thermal amplitudes due to Atlantic influence.

Vegetation is extremely sparse, dominated by ergs (sand dunes) and regs (rocky deserts).

Dakhla
Month	J	F	M	A	M	J	Jl	A	S	O	N	D
Temperature (°C)	17	18	19	19	20	21	22	23	23	22	21	18
Precipitation (mm)	1	0	0	0	0	0	0	0	15	3	3	15

== See also ==
- Geography of Morocco
- Geology of Morocco
- Fauna of Morocco
- Flora of Morocco
- Climate change in Morocco
