= Somabrachys codeti =

Scientific classification
- Domain: Eukaryota
- Kingdom: Animalia
- Phylum: Arthropoda
- Class: Insecta
- Order: Lepidoptera
- Genus: Somabrachys
- Species: S. codeti

Binomial name
- Somabrachys codeti Austaut, 1880

Synonyms
- Somabrachys atrinervis Oberthür, 1911

Species of moth

Somabrachys codeti is a moth in the Somabrachyidae family. It was described by Jules Léon Austaut in 1880.
