= Somabrachys arcanaria =

Scientific classification
- Domain: Eukaryota
- Kingdom: Animalia
- Phylum: Arthropoda
- Class: Insecta
- Order: Lepidoptera
- Genus: Somabrachys
- Species: S. arcanaria

Binomial name
- Somabrachys arcanaria Milliére, 1884

Species of moth

Somabrachys arcanaria is a moth in the Somabrachyidae family. It was described by Pierre Millière in 1884.
