= Somabrachys adherbal =

Scientific classification
- Domain: Eukaryota
- Kingdom: Animalia
- Phylum: Arthropoda
- Class: Insecta
- Order: Lepidoptera
- Genus: Somabrachys
- Species: S. adherbal

Binomial name
- Somabrachys adherbal Oberthür, 1911

Species of moth

Somabrachys adherbal is a moth in the Somabrachyidae family. It was described by Oberthür in 1911.
