= Somabrachys kroumira =

Scientific classification
- Domain: Eukaryota
- Kingdom: Animalia
- Phylum: Arthropoda
- Class: Insecta
- Order: Lepidoptera
- Genus: Somabrachys
- Species: S. kroumira

Binomial name
- Somabrachys kroumira Oberthür, 1911

Species of moth

Somabrachys kroumira is a moth in the Somabrachyidae family. It was described by Oberthür in 1911.
