= Somabrachys powelli =

Scientific classification
- Domain: Eukaryota
- Kingdom: Animalia
- Phylum: Arthropoda
- Class: Insecta
- Order: Lepidoptera
- Genus: Somabrachys
- Species: S. powelli

Binomial name
- Somabrachys powelli Oberthür, 1908

Species of moth

Somabrachys powelli is a moth in the Somabrachyidae family. It was described by Oberthür in 1908.
