= Somabrachys mogadorensis =

Scientific classification
- Domain: Eukaryota
- Kingdom: Animalia
- Phylum: Arthropoda
- Class: Insecta
- Order: Lepidoptera
- Genus: Somabrachys
- Species: S. mogadorensis

Binomial name
- Somabrachys mogadorensis Oberthür, 1911

Species of moth

Somabrachys mogadorensis is a moth in the Somabrachyidae family. It was described by Oberthür in 1911.
