= Somabrachys albinervis =

Scientific classification
- Domain: Eukaryota
- Kingdom: Animalia
- Phylum: Arthropoda
- Class: Insecta
- Order: Lepidoptera
- Genus: Somabrachys
- Species: S. albinervis

Binomial name
- Somabrachys albinervis Oberthür, 1909

Species of moth

Somabrachys albinervis is a moth in the Somabrachyidae family. It was described by Oberthür in 1909.
