= Geography of Morocco =

- Continent: Africa
- Region: Northwest Africa
- Coordinates: 27°00′N 1°00′W
- Area
  - Total: 446,300 km^{2} (172,300 sq mi)
- Coastline: 1,835 km (1,140 mi)
- Highest point: Toubkal, 4,167 m
- Lowest point: Sebkha Tah, −55 m
- Longest river: Draa River
- Largest lake: Lake Aguelmame Sidi Ali
- Climate: Mediterranean climate, Desert climate

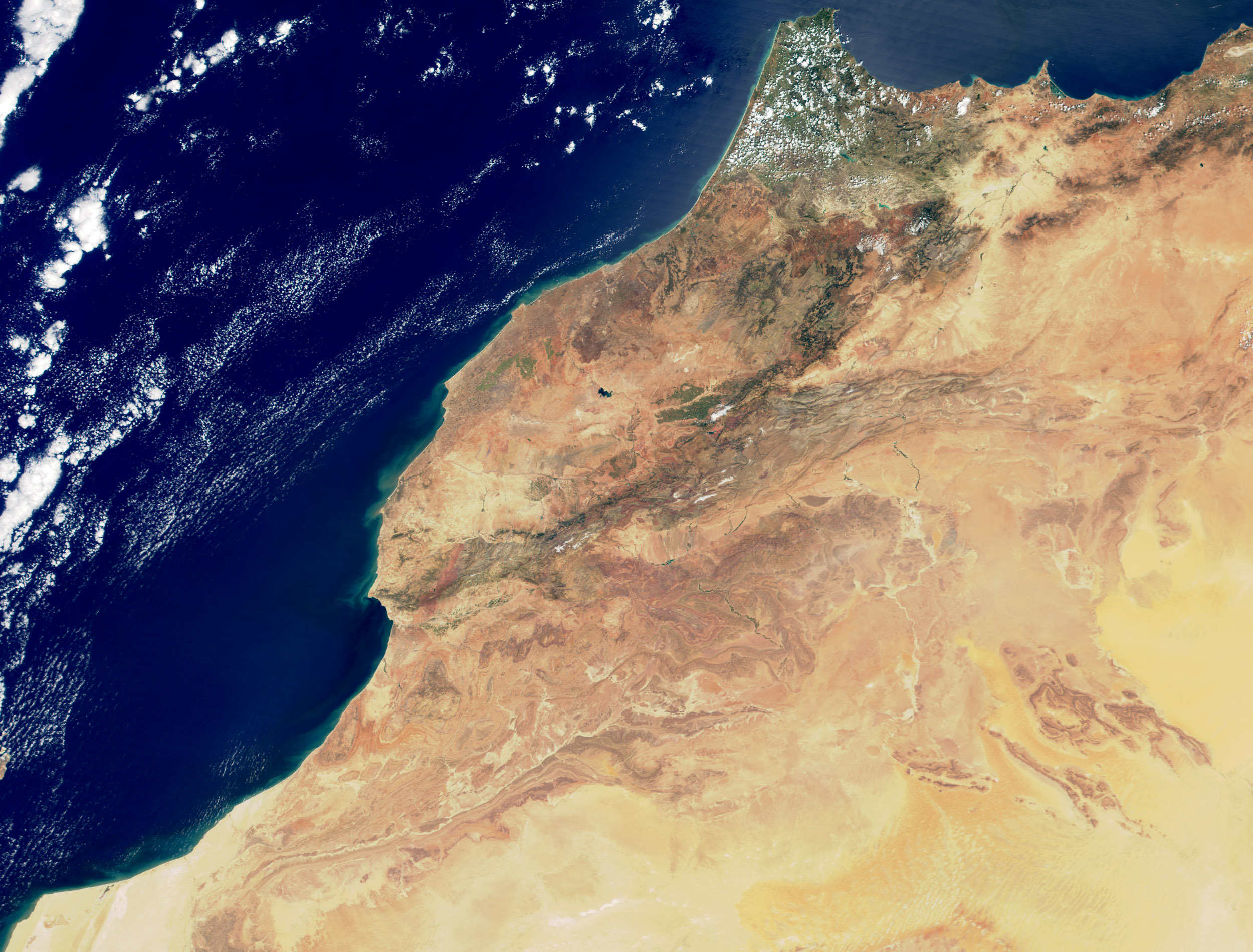
True-colour image of Morocco from Terra spacecraft

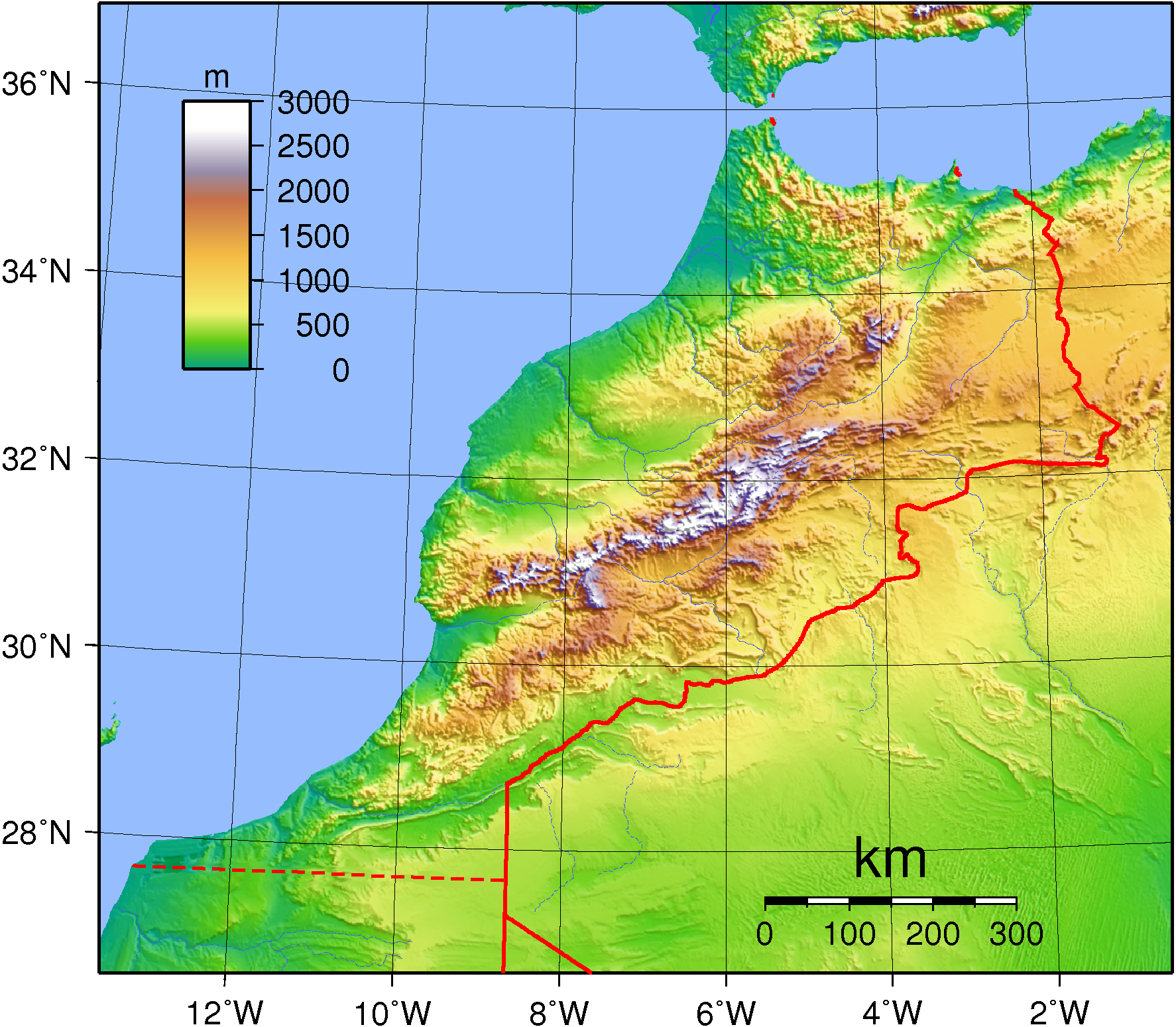
Topography of Morocco

Morocco is the northwesternmost country which spans from the Mediterranean Sea and Atlantic Ocean on the north and the west respectively, into large mountainous areas in the interior, to the Sahara desert in the far south. Morocco is a Northern African country, located in the extreme northwest of Africa on the edge of continental Europe. The Strait of Gibraltar separates Spain from Morocco with a 13 kilometres (8.1 mi) span of water. Morocco borders the North Atlantic Ocean to the west, and the western Mediterranean Sea to the north, and has borders with Algeria and disputed Western Sahara.

The terrain of Morocco is largely mountainous. The Atlas Mountains stretch from the central north to the southwest. It expands to about 1,350 kilometres (840 mi) and is the dorsal spine of the country. To the north of the Atlas Mountains, there are the Rif Mountains, a chain that makes part of the Sierra Nevada mountain range in Andalusia, Spain. The massive range expands to about 250 kilometres (160 mi) from Tangier in the west to Nador eastward.

In the west of the country, along the Atlantic coast, the Moroccan Plateau stretches from Tangier to Essaouira and get inward to Saiss Plains near Fez and Tansift-Alhaouz near Marrakesh. These vast plains promotes fertile agricultural lands and support 15% of the local economy.

In the extreme southeast of the country, the lands are arid due to their proximity to the Sahara Desert. Palm trees oasis are developed in many regions, notably in Figuig and Zagora.

== Geography statistics ==
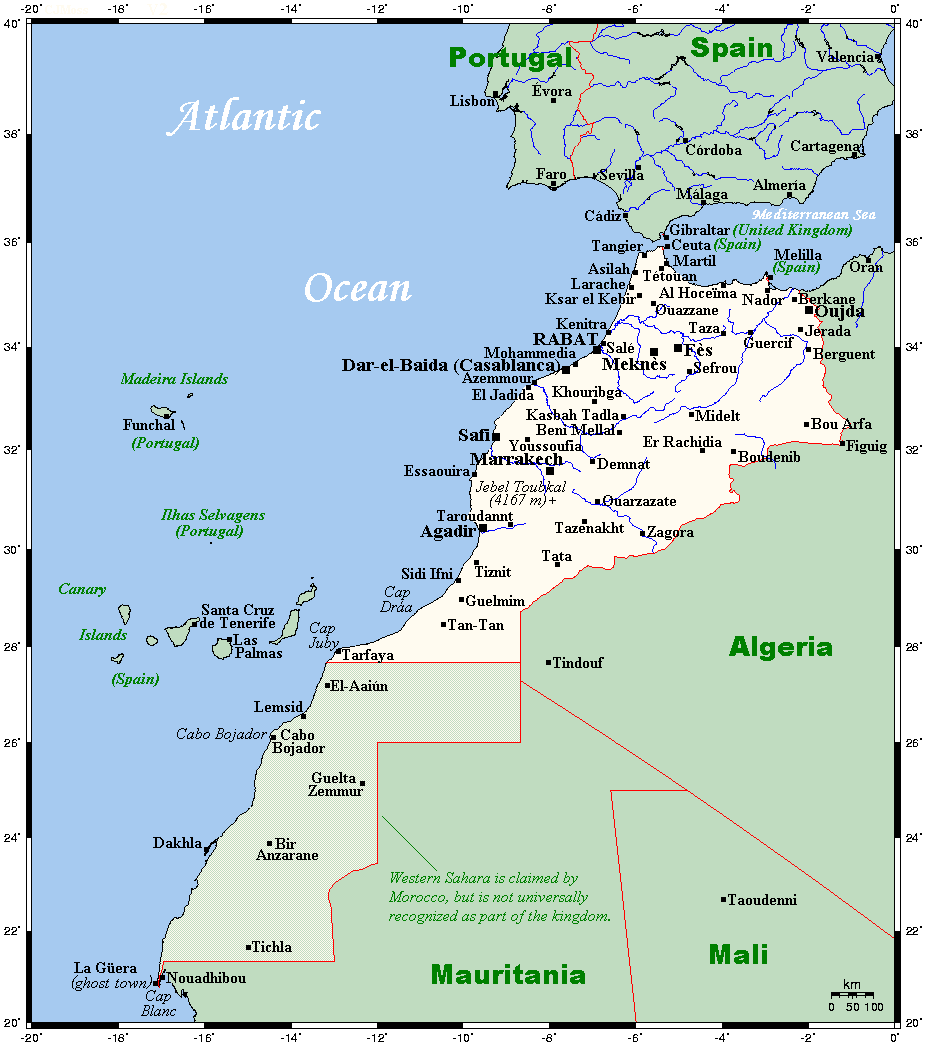
Morocco's and Western Sahara's cities and main towns

Coordinates:

32°00′N 5°00′W

Area:
total: 446,550km²
land: 446,302km² (or 712,200km²)
water: 250km²

Land boundaries:
total: 2,018.9km
border countries: Algeria 1 559km, Western Sahara 444km, Spain (Ceuta) 6.3km, Spain (Melilla) 9.6km

Coastline: 1835 km

Maritime claims:
Territorial sea: 12 nmi (22.2 km; 13.8 mi)
Contiguous zone: 24 nmi (44.4 km; 27.6 mi)
Exclusive economic zone: 575,230 km^{2} (222,100 mi^{2}) with 200 nmi (370.4 km)
Continental shelf: 200-m depth or to the depth of exploitation

== Climate ==
Köppen climate types in Morocco

Morocco's climate can be divided into two parts: The northwest and the southeast. In the southeast, the climate is arid and poorly populated. The northwest has a mild climate, and 95% of the Moroccan population lives in these regions.

The largely populated areas of the northwest of the country mostly have a Mediterranean climate, but since the country is heavily mountainous, continental and alpine influence is evident, as well as the oceanic influence along the Atlantic coastline. And finally, the semi-arid lands, that cover few regions in the northeast, the central-south, and the southwest.

Along the Mediterranean coast, the climate is typically Mediterranean and supports all types of typical Mediterranean vegetation. The summers are moderately hot and the winters are mild. Further away from the coast, into the Rif Mountain range, the climate starts to become more continental in character, with colder winters and hotter summers. At elevations above 1,000 metres (3,300 ft), the climate is alpine with warm summers and cold winters. Rainfall is much higher on the west side than it is on the east side. The average annual precipitation is between 600 and 1,500 mm (24 and 59 in), and 300 and 700 mm (12 and 28 in) respectively. Snow is abundant at higher elevations.

1. Typical Mediterranean climate cities: Tangier, Tétouan, Al Hoceima, Nador
2. Typical continental-influenced cities: Chefchaouen, Issaguen, Targuist, Taza
3. Typical alpine-influenced cities: Bab Berred

Along the Atlantic coast, the climate is Mediterranean with oceanic influence. The imprint of the oceanic climate differs along the coastline from region to region. It is generally present from Asilah to Essaouira. The summers are warm to moderately hot, and winters are cooler than on the Mediterranean coast. Further away from the coastal lands, into the Atlas Mountain range, the climate starts to become more continental in character, with colder winters and hotter summers. At elevations above 1,000 metres (3,300 ft), the climate is typically alpine, with warm summers and cold winters. Rainfall is generally high. The average annual precipitations is between 500 and 1,800 mm (20 and 71 in) on the north, but as you move southward, the average drops by about 100 to 200 mm (3.9 to 7.9 in). Snow is abundant at higher elevations. There are two ski stations, one in the middle-Atlas Mischliffen, and the other in the High-Atlas Oukaïmeden.

1. Typical oceanic-influenced cities: Rabat, Casablanca, Essaouira, Larache
2. Typical continental-influenced cities: Fez, Meknès, Khenifra, Beni Mellal
3. Typical alpine-influenced cities: Ifrane, Azrou, Midelt, Imouzzer Kandar

The southern regions of the northwest are semi-arid. Rainfall is lower, and is between 250 and 350 mm (9.8 and 13.8 in) annually. Although temperature ranges generally do not change in comparison with the upper provinces, a slight increase in high averages is not to be dismissed. Largely due to the lower latitudes where they fall.

Typical cities with such climate are Agadir and Marrakesh.

Climate data for Casablanca (1981–2010)
Month	Jan	Feb	Mar	Apr	May	Jun	Jul	Aug	Sep	Oct	Nov	Dec	Year
Record high °C (°F)	31.1 (88.0)	29.4 (84.9)	32.2 (90.0)	32.8 (91.0)	36.6 (97.9)	37.8 (100.0)	40.1 (104.2)	39.5 (103.1)	40.5 (104.9)	36.6 (97.9)	34.7 (94.5)	30.3 (86.5)	40.5 (104.9)
Mean daily maximum °C (°F)	17.3 (63.1)	18.0 (64.4)	19.6 (67.3)	20.3 (68.5)	21.9 (71.4)	24.1 (75.4)	25.9 (78.6)	26.3 (79.3)	25.8 (78.4)	23.9 (75.0)	21.0 (69.8)	18.7 (65.7)	21.9 (71.4)
Daily mean °C (°F)	12.8 (55.0)	13.8 (56.8)	15.3 (59.5)	16.4 (61.5)	18.5 (65.3)	21.2 (70.2)	23.0 (73.4)	23.4 (74.1)	22.4 (72.3)	20.0 (68.0)	16.7 (62.1)	14.5 (58.1)	18.2 (64.8)
Mean daily minimum °C (°F)	8.3 (46.9)	9.5 (49.1)	11.0 (51.8)	12.5 (54.5)	15.0 (59.0)	18.2 (64.8)	20.1 (68.2)	20.5 (68.9)	19.1 (66.4)	16.1 (61.0)	12.5 (54.5)	10.2 (50.4)	14.4 (57.9)
Record low °C (°F)	−1.5 (29.3)	−0.7 (30.7)	2.3 (36.1)	5.0 (41.0)	7.4 (45.3)	10.0 (50.0)	13.0 (55.4)	13.0 (55.4)	10.0 (50.0)	7.0 (44.6)	4.6 (40.3)	−2.7 (27.1)	−2.7 (27.1)
Average rainfall mm (inches)	64.4 (2.54)	54.7 (2.15)	36.6 (1.44)	31.8 (1.25)	13.1 (0.52)	3.0 (0.12)	0.9 (0.04)	0.5 (0.02)	9.8 (0.39)	37.0 (1.46)	76.8 (3.02)	69.7 (2.74)	398.3 (15.68)
Average rainy days	9	9	7	8	6	2	1	1	3	7	9	11	72
Average relative humidity (%)	83	83	82	80	79	81	82	83	83	82	82	84	82
Mean monthly sunshine hours	203.0	200.0	246.8	269.4	305.4	296.0	305.1	297.2	263.1	240.8	208.0	195.2	3,030
Source 1: World Meteorological Organization
Source 2: Pogoda.ru.net (humidity, rain days and extremes)

Climate data for Fez (Fès–Saïs Airport), altitude: 579 m (1,900 ft) 1981–2010
Month	Jan	Feb	Mar	Apr	May	Jun	Jul	Aug	Sep	Oct	Nov	Dec	Year
Record high °C (°F)	25.0 (77.0)	30.5 (86.9)	33.3 (91.9)	37.0 (98.6)	40.8 (105.4)	44.0 (111.2)	46.7 (116.1)	44.4 (111.9)	41.7 (107.1)	37.5 (99.5)	31.2 (88.2)	27.0 (80.6)	46.7 (116.1)
Mean daily maximum °C (°F)	15.4 (59.7)	17.0 (62.6)	19.8 (67.6)	21.2 (70.2)	25.0 (77.0)	30.4 (86.7)	34.7 (94.5)	34.2 (93.6)	30.3 (86.5)	25.4 (77.7)	19.9 (67.8)	16.5 (61.7)	24.1 (75.4)
Daily mean °C (°F)	9.3 (48.7)	10.7 (51.3)	13.1 (55.6)	14.5 (58.1)	17.8 (64.0)	22.4 (72.3)	26.1 (79.0)	25.9 (78.6)	22.8 (73.0)	18.7 (65.7)	13.9 (57.0)	10.8 (51.4)	17.2 (63.0)
Mean daily minimum °C (°F)	3.2 (37.8)	4.5 (40.1)	6.3 (43.3)	7.8 (46.0)	10.7 (51.3)	14.4 (57.9)	17.5 (63.5)	17.6 (63.7)	15.4 (59.7)	11.9 (53.4)	8.0 (46.4)	5.1 (41.2)	10.2 (50.4)
Record low °C (°F)	−8.2 (17.2)	−4.9 (23.2)	−2.5 (27.5)	−0.5 (31.1)	0.0 (32.0)	4.9 (40.8)	8.5 (47.3)	9.2 (48.6)	5.9 (42.6)	0.0 (32.0)	−1.4 (29.5)	−5.0 (23.0)	−8.2 (17.2)
Average rainfall mm (inches)	55.7 (2.19)	55.8 (2.20)	52.3 (2.06)	57.2 (2.25)	33.9 (1.33)	10.6 (0.42)	1.0 (0.04)	4.5 (0.18)	18.9 (0.74)	50.1 (1.97)	61.2 (2.41)	69.2 (2.72)	470.4 (18.52)
Average rainy days	12.1	13.2	13.5	13.5	10.2	5.3	1.6	1.8	4.7	9.1	12.7	12.1	109.8
Average snowy days	0.2	0.0	0.0	0.0	0.0	0.0	0.0	0.0	0.0	0.0	0.0	0.0	0.2
Mean monthly sunshine hours	210.6	201.1	244.0	246.5	278.0	315.0	338.0	320.4	382.5	245.5	205.2	199.8	3,186.6
Percentage possible sunshine	60	55	58	62	64	71	79	77	75	64	60	60	65
Source 1: World Meteorological Organization, NOAA (precipitation days 1961–1990)
Source 2: Meoweather.com, Voodoo skies for extremes Weather Atlas

Climate data for Marrakesh, Morocco (Marrakesh Menara Airport) 1981–2010, extremes 1900–present
Month	Jan	Feb	Mar	Apr	May	Jun	Jul	Aug	Sep	Oct	Nov	Dec	Year
Record high °C (°F)	30.1 (86.2)	34.3 (93.7)	37.0 (98.6)	39.6 (103.3)	44.4 (111.9)	46.9 (116.4)	49.6 (121.3)	48.6 (119.5)	44.8 (112.6)	38.7 (101.7)	35.2 (95.4)	30.0 (86.0)	49.6 (121.3)
Mean daily maximum °C (°F)	18.6 (65.5)	20.5 (68.9)	23.5 (74.3)	25.0 (77.0)	28.3 (82.9)	32.8 (91.0)	37.2 (99.0)	36.6 (97.9)	32.5 (90.5)	27.9 (82.2)	22.9 (73.2)	19.6 (67.3)	27.1 (80.8)
Daily mean °C (°F)	12.2 (54.0)	14.2 (57.6)	17.0 (62.6)	18.4 (65.1)	21.3 (70.3)	25.1 (77.2)	28.9 (84.0)	28.6 (83.5)	25.6 (78.1)	21.6 (70.9)	16.8 (62.2)	13.5 (56.3)	20.3 (68.5)
Mean daily minimum °C (°F)	5.8 (42.4)	8.0 (46.4)	10.4 (50.7)	11.9 (53.4)	14.4 (57.9)	17.5 (63.5)	20.5 (68.9)	20.6 (69.1)	18.7 (65.7)	15.3 (59.5)	10.7 (51.3)	7.3 (45.1)	13.4 (56.1)
Record low °C (°F)	−2.3 (27.9)	−3.0 (26.6)	0.4 (32.7)	2.8 (37.0)	6.8 (44.2)	9.0 (48.2)	10.4 (50.7)	6.0 (42.8)	10.0 (50.0)	1.1 (34.0)	0.0 (32.0)	−1.6 (29.1)	−3.0 (26.6)
Average precipitation mm (inches)	29.5 (1.16)	29.6 (1.17)	36.6 (1.44)	24.4 (0.96)	10.5 (0.41)	4.0 (0.16)	2.3 (0.09)	2.7 (0.11)	9.7 (0.38)	17.5 (0.69)	28.7 (1.13)	24.6 (0.97)	220.3 (8.67)
Average precipitation days	7.6	6.8	7.5	7.7	4.8	1.2	0.6	1.2	2.8	5.5	6.6	6.5	58.8
Average relative humidity (%)	65	66	61	60	58	55	47	47	52	59	62	65	58
Mean monthly sunshine hours	230.1	216.5	252.8	270.2	303.1	359.7	330.4	315.1	268.8	251.5	228.9	226.6	3,253.7
Percentage possible sunshine	71	68	67	65	66	75	77	78	73	72	65	71	71
Source 1: World Meteorological Organization, NOAA (precipitation days 1961–1990), Weather Atlas (percent sunshine)
Source 2: Deutscher Wetterdienst (record highs for February, April, May, September and November, and humidity), Meteo Climat (record highs and record lows for June, July and August only)

Climate data for Ouarzazate (1981–2010, extremes 1941–1963 and 1965–present) (Note: The record highs and lows are based on the Deutscher Wetterdienst link for the period 1941–1963 while records beyond 1965 come from the Meteo Climat link. As a result, the most extreme values from either source are used.)
Month	Jan	Feb	Mar	Apr	May	Jun	Jul	Aug	Sep	Oct	Nov	Dec	Year
Record high °C (°F)	26.6 (79.9)	29.8 (85.6)	32.0 (89.6)	34.8 (94.6)	39.2 (102.6)	43.6 (110.5)	43.4 (110.1)	44.0 (111.2)	43.2 (109.8)	34.9 (94.8)	30.5 (86.9)	27.0 (80.6)	44.0 (111.2)
Mean daily maximum °C (°F)	16.8 (62.2)	19.1 (66.4)	22.6 (72.7)	25.9 (78.6)	29.8 (85.6)	34.9 (94.8)	38.2 (100.8)	37.1 (98.8)	32.8 (91.0)	27.0 (80.6)	21.5 (70.7)	17.4 (63.3)	26.9 (80.4)
Daily mean °C (°F)	9.4 (48.9)	12.0 (53.6)	15.5 (59.9)	18.7 (65.7)	22.5 (72.5)	27.1 (80.8)	30.3 (86.5)	29.4 (84.9)	25.5 (77.9)	20.1 (68.2)	14.4 (57.9)	10.4 (50.7)	19.6 (67.3)
Mean daily minimum °C (°F)	2.0 (35.6)	4.8 (40.6)	8.4 (47.1)	11.5 (52.7)	15.1 (59.2)	19.3 (66.7)	22.5 (72.5)	21.7 (71.1)	18.1 (64.6)	13.1 (55.6)	7.3 (45.1)	3.3 (37.9)	12.3 (54.1)
Record low °C (°F)	−7.0 (19.4)	−5.4 (22.3)	−2.0 (28.4)	−1.0 (30.2)	3.6 (38.5)	7.6 (45.7)	13.0 (55.4)	12.6 (54.7)	9.0 (48.2)	4.0 (39.2)	−2.6 (27.3)	−4.9 (23.2)	−7.0 (19.4)
Average precipitation mm (inches)	8.6 (0.34)	18.4 (0.72)	13.5 (0.53)	7.0 (0.28)	4.9 (0.19)	6.7 (0.26)	3.0 (0.12)	9.6 (0.38)	11.3 (0.44)	15.2 (0.60)	10.1 (0.40)	12.7 (0.50)	120.9 (4.76)
Average precipitation days	2.9	2.8	2.2	2.0	2.3	1.3	1.6	3.3	4.9	3.4	3.8	2.4	32.9
Average relative humidity (%)	54	46	42	38	33	27	22	27	34	42	61	64	41
Mean monthly sunshine hours	261.8	251.5	291.7	317.8	343.2	336.7	316.3	294.9	273.2	273.1	256.5	250.3	3,467
Source 1: World Meteorological Organization, NOAA (precipitation days 1961–1990)
Source 2: Deutscher Wetterdienst (record highs for February, May, July, August, and November, record lows, and humidity) Meteo Climat (all other record highs and record lows for June, July, September and October only)

=== Climate change ===
Climate change is expected to significantly impact Morocco on multiple dimensions, similar to other countries in the Middle East and North Africa region. As a coastal country with hot and arid climates, environmental impacts from climate change are likely to be wide and varied. Analysis of these environmental changes on the economy of Morocco are expected to create challenges at all levels of the economy. The main effects will be felt in the agricultural systems and fisheries which employ half of the population, and account for 14% of GDP. In addition, because 60% of the population and most of the industrial activity are on the coast, sea level rise is a major threat to key economic forces. Morocco's average temperatures have increased by 0.2 °C per decade since the 1960s. Morocco is particularly susceptible to heat waves, droughts and floods.

Morocco ratified the Paris Agreement in 2015. Its Nationally Determined Contribution (NDC) aimed at reducing its greenhouse gas emissions (GHG) by 17% by 2030 compared to business-as-usual (BAU), with the possibility of a reduction of 32% conditional on receiving international support. In June 2021, Morocco submitted an updated NDC with more ambitious targets: reduce GHGs by 18.3% by 2030 compared to BAU, with a reduction of 45.5% conditional on receiving international support. Morocco's contribution to global GHGs is very small (about 0.18%) and majority of GHGs come from the energy sector. As of the 2023 Climate Change Performance Index, Morocco was ranked seventh in preparedness for climate change.

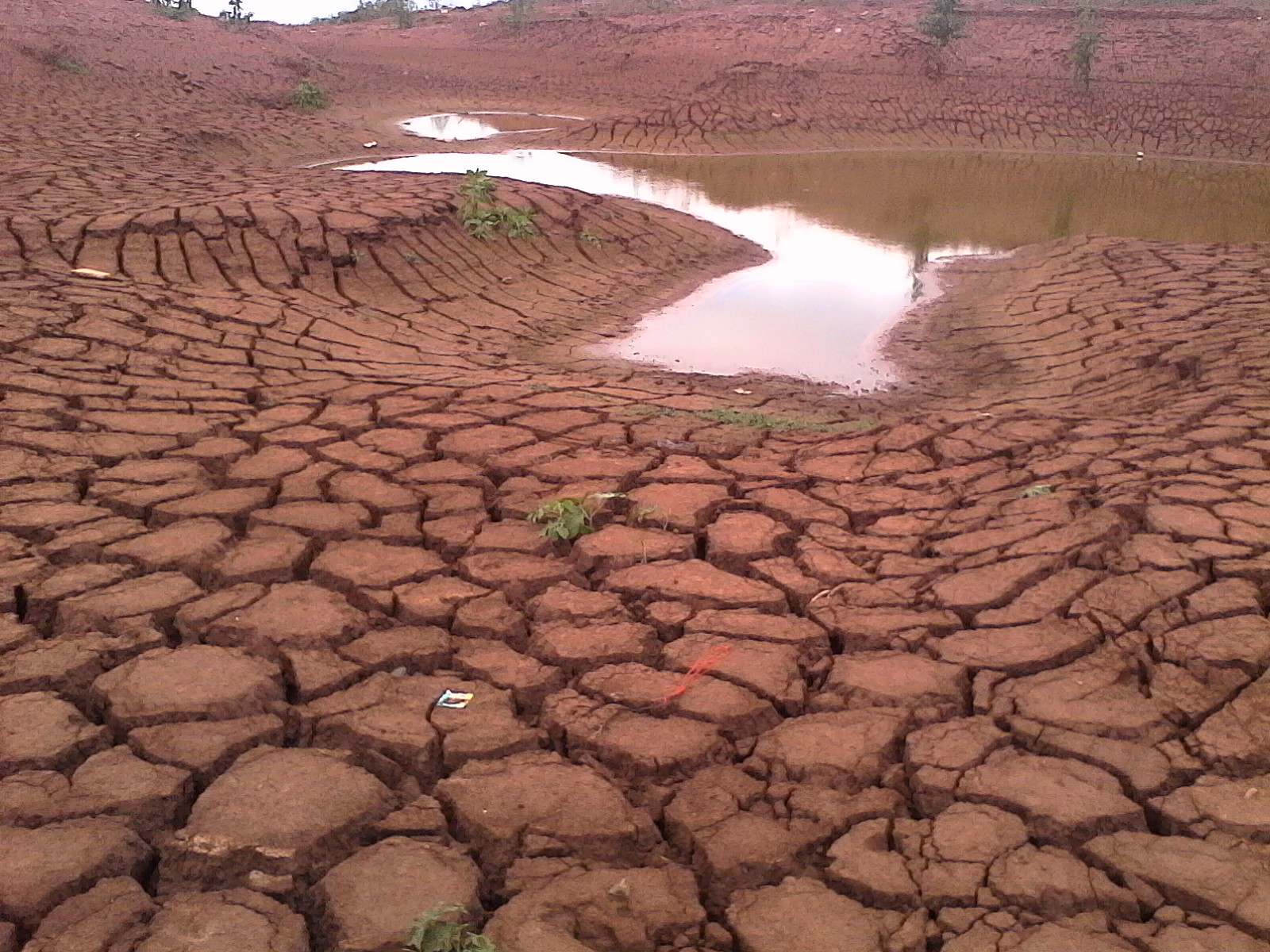
A dried body of water in Agadir. Climate change will increase the frequency of drought in Morocco.

As of 2020, Morocco has been hit with unseasonal heatwaves.

== Physical geography ==
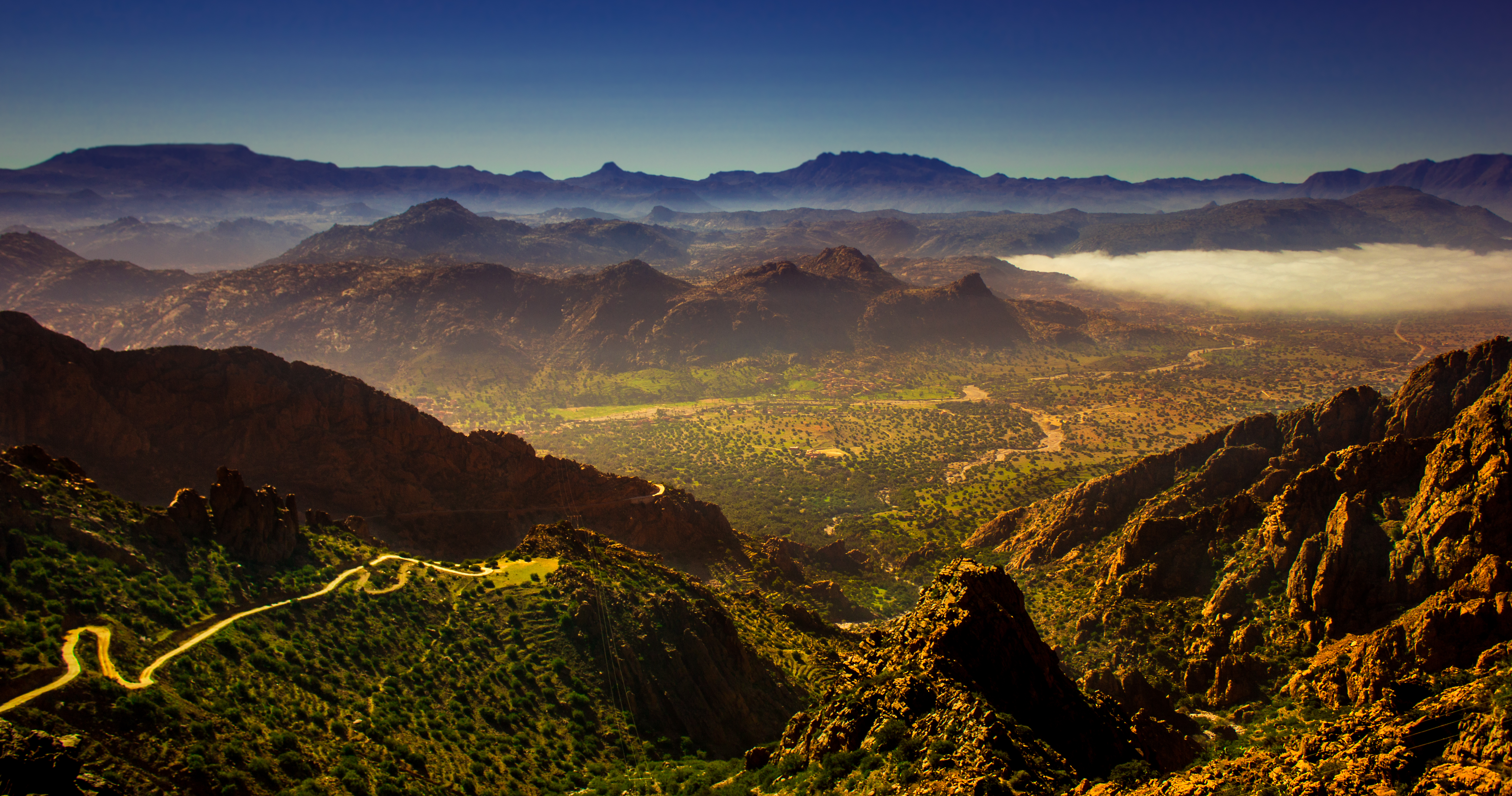
Anti-Atlas mountain range

The northern coast and interior are mountainous with large areas of bordering plateaus, intermontane valleys, and rich coastal plains. The northern mountains are geologically unstable and subject to earthquakes.

Morocco occupies a strategic location along the Strait of Gibraltar, the waterway connecting the Mediterranean Sea and Atlantic Ocean.

Elevation extremes:
Lowest point: Sebkha Tah −55 m
Highest point: Toubkal mountain 4,165 m

Longest river: Draa River (1,100 km)

== Land use and natural resources ==
Natural resources: Phosphates, Iron ore, Manganese, Lead, Zinc, Fish, Salt

Land use:
Arable land: 17.5%
Permanent crops: 2.9%
Permanent pastures: 47.1%
Forests: 11.5%
Other: 21.61% (2011)

Irrigated land: 14,850 km² (2004)

Total renewable water resources: 29 km^{3} (2011)

Natural hazards: periodic droughts

== Environment ==
=== Ecoregions ===
==== Mediterranean forests, woodlands, and scrub ====
- Mediterranean dry woodlands and steppe
- Mediterranean woodlands and forests
- Mediterranean Acacia-Argania dry woodlands and succulent thickets

==== Temperate coniferous forests ====
- Mediterranean conifer and mixed forests

==== Montane grasslands and shrublands ====
- Mediterranean High Atlas juniper steppe

==== Deserts and xeric shrublands ====
- North Saharan steppe and woodlands

==== Freshwater ecoregions ====
- Permanent Maghreb
- Temporary Maghreb

==== Marine ecoregions ====
- Alboran Sea
- Saharan Upwelling

=== Current environmental issues ===
Land degradation/desertification (soil erosion resulting from farming of marginal areas, overgrazing, destruction of vegetation); water supplies contaminated by raw sewage; siltation of reservoirs; oil pollution of coastal waters.

=== International environmental agreements ===
Morocco is party to: Biodiversity, Climate Change, Climate Change-Kyoto Protocol, Desertification, Endangered Species, Hazardous Wastes, Law of the Sea, Marine Dumping, Ozone Layer Protection, Ship Pollution (MARPOL 73/78), Wetlands, Whaling
signed, but not ratified: Environmental Modification

=== Tree cover extent and loss ===
Global Forest Watch publishes annual estimates of tree cover loss and 2000 tree cover extent derived from time-series analysis of Landsat satellite imagery in the Global Forest Change dataset. In this framework, tree cover refers to vegetation taller than 5 m (including natural forests and tree plantations), and tree cover loss is defined as the complete removal of tree cover canopy for a given year, regardless of cause.

For Morocco, country statistics report cumulative tree cover loss of 60,012 ha (600.12 km^{2}) from 2001 to 2024 (about 9.3% of its 2000 tree cover area). For tree cover density greater than 30%, country statistics report a 2000 tree cover extent of 648,566 ha (6,485.66 km^{2}). The charts and table below display this data. In simple terms, the annual loss number is the area where tree cover disappeared in that year, and the extent number shows what remains of the 2000 tree cover baseline after subtracting cumulative loss. Forest regrowth is not included in the dataset.

Annual tree cover loss in Morocco, 2001–2024. View chart definition.
Tree cover extent in 2000 minus cumulative tree cover loss in Morocco, 2001–2024 (loss-only residual; does not account for gain). View chart definition.

Annual tree cover extent and loss
Year	Tree cover extent (km2) (Note: This residual measure does not include forest regrowth.)	Annual tree cover loss (km2)
2001	6,466.98	18.68
2002	6,427.76	39.22
2003	6,407.33	20.43
2004	6,392.92	14.41
2005	6,377.66	15.26
2006	6,355.44	22.22
2007	6,330.31	25.13
2008	6,296.22	34.09
2009	6,284.25	11.97
2010	6,274.36	9.89
2011	6,240.44	33.92
2012	6,223.54	16.90
2013	6,215.18	8.36
2014	6,198.36	16.82
2015	6,188.84	9.52
2016	6,168.43	20.41
2017	6,144.76	23.67
2018	6,123.98	20.78
2019	6,111.47	12.51
2020	6,075.27	36.20
2021	6,059.88	15.39
2022	5,939.71	120.17
2023	5,899.65	40.06
2024	5,885.54	14.11

== Extreme points ==
This is a list of the extreme points of Morocco, the points that are farther north, east or west than any other location.

- Northernmost point – Pointe Leona, Tangier-Tétouan-Al Hoceima region
- Easternmost point – unnamed point on the border with Algeria immediately east of the town of Iche, Oriental region
- Westernmost point – the point at which the border with Western Sahara enters the Atlantic Ocean, Guelmim-Oued Noun region
  - Note: Morocco does not have a southernmost point, its southern border with Western Sahara following latitude 27° 40′ north.

== See also ==
- Climate of Morocco
- List of rivers of Morocco
