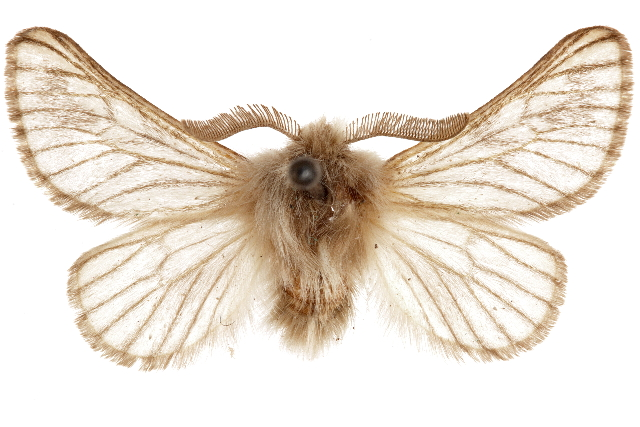

Scientific classification
- Domain: Eukaryota
- Kingdom: Animalia
- Phylum: Arthropoda
- Class: Insecta
- Order: Lepidoptera
- Genus: Somabrachys
- Species: S. infuscata

Binomial name
- Somabrachys infuscata Klug, 1830

Synonyms
- Somabrachys ragmata Chrétien, 1910

= Somabrachys infuscata =

Species of moth

Somabrachys infuscata is a species of moth in the family Somabrachyidae. It was described by Johann Christoph Friedrich Klug in 1830.

== Subspecies ==
- Somabrachys infuscata robusta Hering, 1933
