= Somabrachys capsitana =

Scientific classification
- Domain: Eukaryota
- Kingdom: Animalia
- Phylum: Arthropoda
- Class: Insecta
- Order: Lepidoptera
- Genus: Somabrachys
- Species: S. capsitana

Binomial name
- Somabrachys capsitana Chrétien

Species of moth

Somabrachys capsitana is a moth in the family Somabrachyidae. It was described by Pierre Chrétien.
