= Somabrachys zion =

Scientific classification
- Domain: Eukaryota
- Kingdom: Animalia
- Phylum: Arthropoda
- Class: Insecta
- Order: Lepidoptera
- Genus: Somabrachys
- Species: S. zion

Binomial name
- Somabrachys zion Hopp, 1922

Species of moth

Somabrachys zion is a moth in the family Somabrachyidae. It was described by Walter Hopp in 1922.
