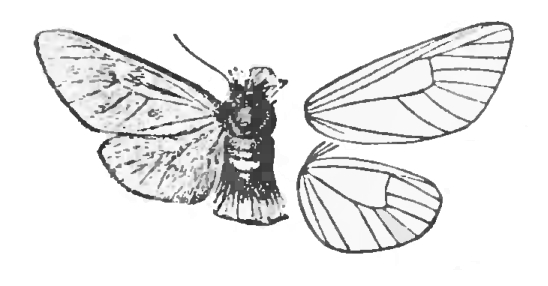

Scientific classification
- Kingdom: Animalia
- Phylum: Arthropoda
- Class: Insecta
- Order: Lepidoptera
- Family: Somabrachyidae
- Genus: Psycharium
- Species: P. pellucens

Binomial name
- Psycharium pellucens Herrich-Schäffer, 1856

= Psycharium pellucens =

Species of moth

Psycharium pellucens is a species of moth of the family Somabrachyidae. It is found in South Africa.
