= Somabrachys guillaumei =

Scientific classification
- Domain: Eukaryota
- Kingdom: Animalia
- Phylum: Arthropoda
- Class: Insecta
- Order: Lepidoptera
- Genus: Somabrachys
- Species: S. guillaumei

Binomial name
- Somabrachys guillaumei Oberthür

Species of moth

Somabrachys guillaumei is a moth in the Somabrachyidae family. It was described by Oberthür.
