= Somabrachys federzonii =

Scientific classification
- Domain: Eukaryota
- Kingdom: Animalia
- Phylum: Arthropoda
- Class: Insecta
- Order: Lepidoptera
- Genus: Somabrachys
- Species: S. federzonii

Binomial name
- Somabrachys federzonii Krüger, 1934

Species of moth

Somabrachys federzonii is a moth in the Somabrachyidae family. It was described by Krüger in 1934.
