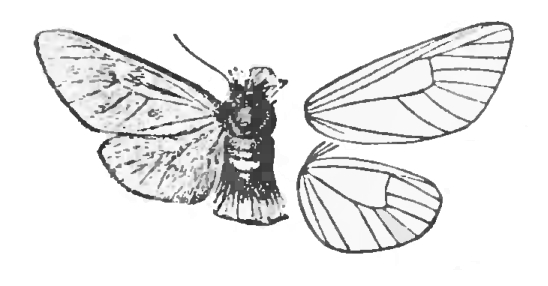
- Psycharium pellucens

Scientific classification
- Kingdom: Animalia
- Phylum: Arthropoda
- Class: Insecta
- Order: Lepidoptera
- Family: Somabrachyidae
- Genus: Psycharium; Herrich-Schäffer, 1856

= Psycharium =

Genus of moths

Psycharium is a genus of moths in the Somabrachyidae family.

== Species ==
- Psycharium barnardi Geertsema, 1998
- Psycharium kammanassiense Geertsema, 1998
- Psycharium montanum Geertsema, 1998
- Psycharium natalense Geertsema, 1998
- Psycharium pellucens Herrich-Schäffer, 1856
