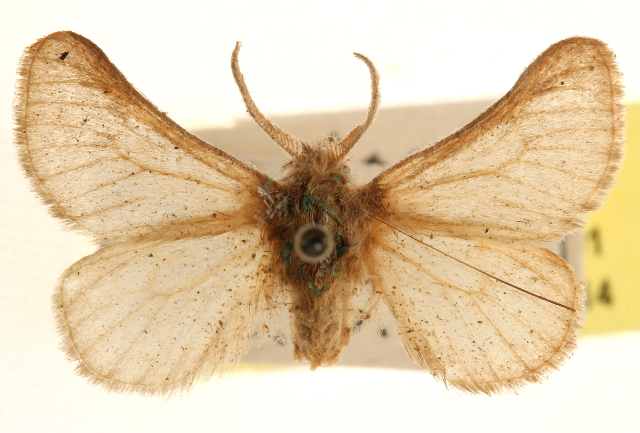
- Somabrachys aegrota

Scientific classification
- Domain: Eukaryota
- Kingdom: Animalia
- Phylum: Arthropoda
- Class: Insecta
- Order: Lepidoptera
- Superfamily: Zygaenoidea
- Genus: Somabrachys; Kirby, 1892

= Somabrachys =

Genus of moths

Somabrachys is a genus of moths in the Somabrachyidae family.

== Species ==
- Somabrachys adherbal Oberthür, 1911
- Somabrachys aegrota (Klug, 1830)
- Somabrachys albinervis Oberthür, 1909
- Somabrachys arcanaria (Milliére, 1884)
- Somabrachys atrinervis Oberthür, 1911
- Somabrachys capsitana Chrétien,
- Somabrachys chretieni Oberthür, 1908
- Somabrachys codeti (Austaut, 1880)
- Somabrachys dubar Powell, 1907
- Somabrachys federzonii Krüger, 1934
- Somabrachys fumosa Oberthür, 1911
- Somabrachys guillaumei Oberthür, 1922
- Somabrachys gulussa Powell, 1916
- Somabrachys hiempsal Oberthür, 1911
- Somabrachys holli Oberthür, 1911
- Somabrachys infuscata (Klug, 1830)
- Somabrachys khenchelae Oberthür, 1909
- Somabrachys klugi Oberthür, 1909
- Somabrachys kroumira Oberthür, 1911
- Somabrachys manastabal Oberthür, 1911
- Somabrachys maroccana Oberthür, 1911
- Somabrachys massiva Oberthür, 1911
- Somabrachys micripsa Powell, 1916
- Somabrachys mogadorensis Oberthür, 1911
- Somabrachys nisseni Powell, 1916
- Somabrachys powelli Oberthür, 1908
- Somabrachys ragmata Chrétien, 1910
- Somabrachys robusta Hering, 1933
- Somabrachys unicolor Oberthür, 1909
- Somabrachys zion Hopp, 1922
