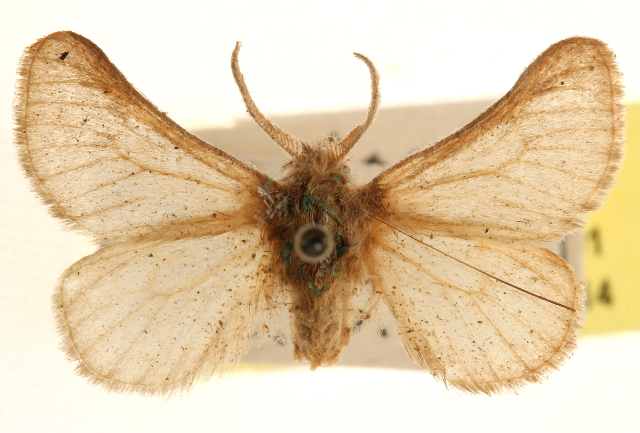

Scientific classification
- Domain: Eukaryota
- Kingdom: Animalia
- Phylum: Arthropoda
- Class: Insecta
- Order: Lepidoptera
- Genus: Somabrachys
- Species: S. aegrota

Binomial name
- Somabrachys aegrota (Klug, 1830)

= Somabrachys aegrota =

Species of moth

Somabrachys aegrota is a moth in the family Somabrachyidae. It was described by Johann Christoph Friedrich Klug in 1830. It occurs in North Africa, Spain and on Sicily. The larvae feed on Cistaceae.
