= Parapsycharium =

Scientific classification
- Kingdom: Animalia
- Phylum: Arthropoda
- Class: Insecta
- Order: Lepidoptera
- Family: Somabrachyidae
- Genus: Parapsycharium; Geertsema, 2000
- Species: P. paarlense

Binomial name
- Parapsycharium paarlense Geertsema, 2000

Genus of moths

Parapsycharium is a genus of moths in the family Somabrachyidae containing only one species Parapsycharium paarlense, which is known from South Africa.
