= Mount Zagora =

Mountain in Morocco

Jbel Zagora جبل زكورة
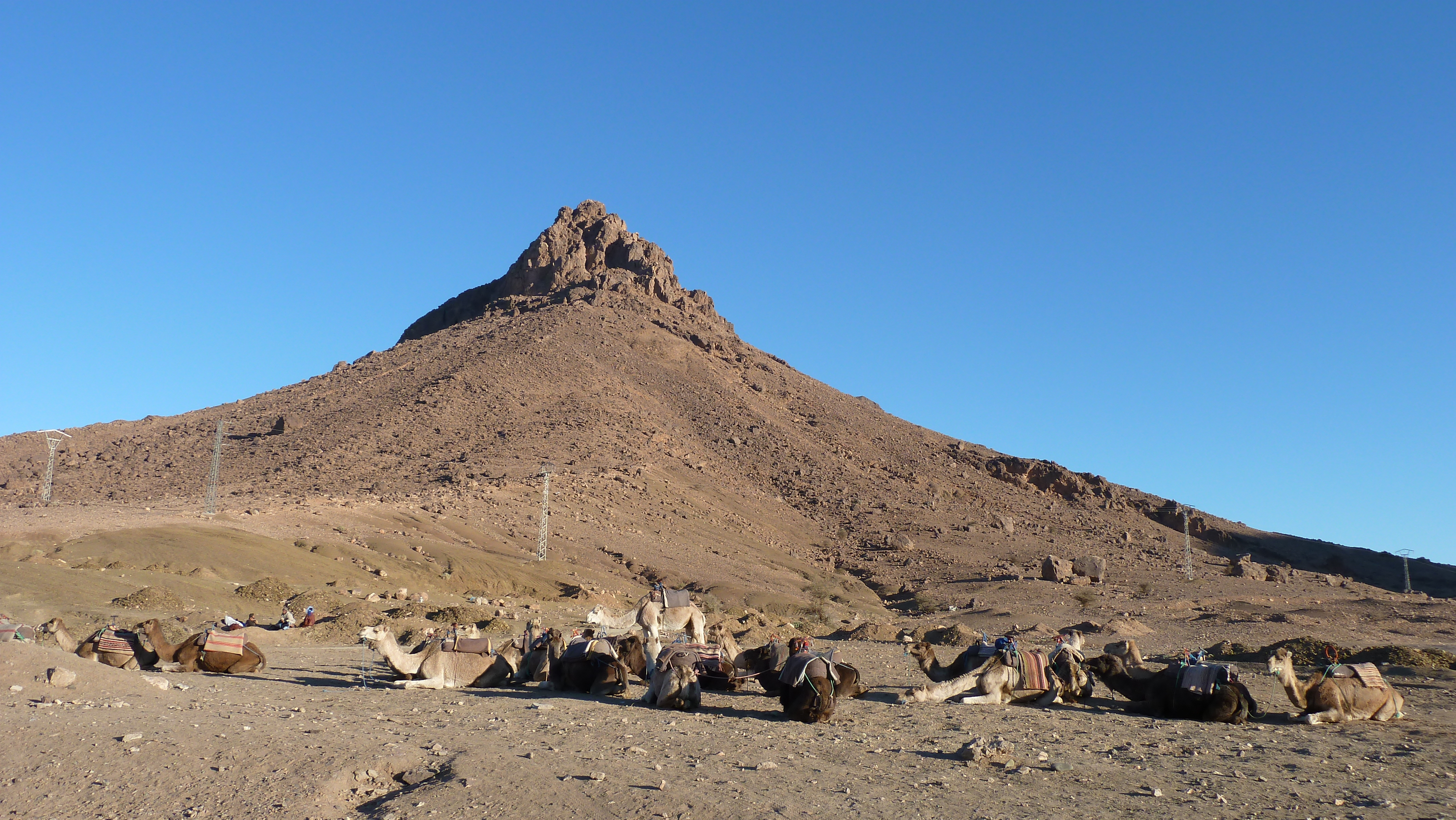
- View of Jbel Zagora

Highest point
- Elevation: 1,030 m (3,380 ft)
- Coordinates: 30°21′N 05°45′W

Geography
- Location within Morocco
- Location: Morocco
- Parent range: Little Atlas

Climbing
- First ascent: Unknown
- Easiest route: From Zagora

Mount Zagora (Jbel Zagora), also known as Tazagourt, is a mountain in south-eastern Morocco, in the region of Drâa-Tafilalet.

== Geography ==
The mountain is situated in the Little Atlas range and gives its name to the nearby town of Zagora. It has a double peak with one of the summits reaching 1030 m and the other 971 m.

On the top of the Zagora mountain the remains of an Almoravid fortress can still be seen.
