= Climate change in Morocco =

Emissions, impacts and responses of Morocco related to climate change

Climate change is expected to significantly impact Morocco on multiple dimensions, similar to other countries in the Middle East and North Africa region. As a coastal country with hot and arid climates, environmental impacts from climate change are likely to be wide and varied. Analysis of these environmental changes on the economy of Morocco are expected to create challenges at all levels of the economy. The main effects will be felt in the agricultural systems and fisheries which employ half of the population, and account for 14% of GDP. In addition, because 60% of the population and most of the industrial activity are on the coast, sea level rise is a major threat to key economic forces. Morocco's average temperatures have increased by 0.2 °C per decade since the 1960s. Morocco is particularly susceptible to heat waves, droughts and floods.

Morocco ratified the Paris Agreement in 2015. Its Nationally Determined Contribution (NDC) aimed at reducing its greenhouse gas emissions (GHG) by 17% by 2030 compared to business-as-usual (BAU), with the possibility of a reduction of 32% conditional on receiving international support. In June 2021, Morocco submitted an updated NDC with more ambitious targets: reduce GHGs by 18.3% by 2030 compared to BAU, with a reduction of 45.5% conditional on receiving international support. Morocco's contribution to global GHGs is very small (about 0.18%) and majority of GHGs come from the energy sector. As of the 2023 Climate Change Performance Index, Morocco was ranked seventh in preparedness for climate change.

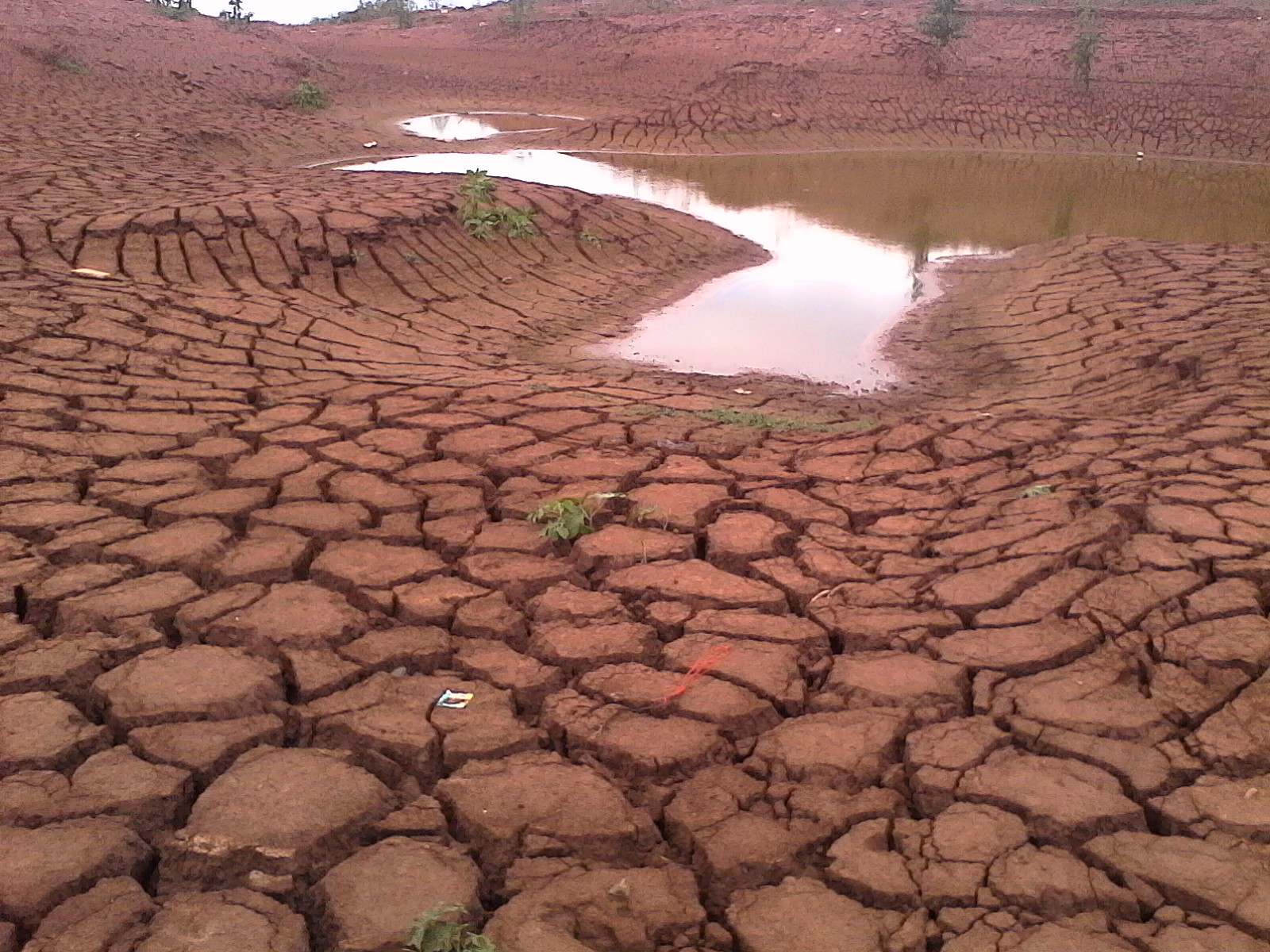
A dried body of water in Agadir. Climate change will increase the frequency of drought in Morocco.

== Greenhouse gas emissions ==
Morocco's GHGs has increased significantly since the 1960s, with the nation's emissions reaching 70.58 million metric tons in 2021. This trend complements the rising population in Morocco, as the emissions per capita have stayed relatively low and steady since the 1910s, staying below 2.0 metric tons per capita every year. For reference, per capita GHGs in the United States were 14.9 metric tons in 2021. Morocco has ambitious plans for renewable energy adoption, particularly through solar energy installations. Some of the country's greenhouse gas emissions can be absorbed through its coastal ecosystems.

== Impacts on the natural environment ==
=== Temperature and weather changes ===
Köppen climate classification map for Morocco for 1980–2016

2071–2100 map under the most intense climate change scenario. Mid-range scenarios are currently considered more likely

==== Temperature ====
Most of Morocco has similar weather to the majority of the Mediterranean region; along the coast, the rainy winter season will amount to 1,200mm of rainfall followed by a dry summer. Temperatures in this region see a range of 8° C to 28° C. The Southern region is drier than the coastline, with an average rainfall around 100mm of rain per year and temperatures ranging from below 0° C to 28° C. The average temperature across Morocco has seen an increase of 0.2°C per decade, but between 1971 and 2017, temperature averages rose by 1.7° C. In Spring 2023, a heat wave broke seasonal averages by 5-13° C and, due to the preceding dry winter, resulted in significant water shortages in dams, which further impacted irrigation and other agricultural practices, and worsened biodiversity loss. Heat waves of this nature present major threats to ecosystems and are expected to become much more common as climate change progresses.

=== Sea level rise ===
60% of the population of Morocco lives on the coast, and flooding and sea level rise are expected to significantly affect these populations. These effects are expected to have the largest impact on economic activities, including tourism, agriculture, and industry.

Morocco's rural northeast coast is particularly vulnerable to sea level rise, storm surges and coastal flooding. Some areas in the north coast are eroding at a rate of 1 meter per year. The increase in sea-level rise will also affect the low terrain surrounding the Moulouya delta, a vital wetland on the eastern coast of Morocco, that is especially vulnerable to sea-level rise and the stress, flooding, erosion, and overall decimation of the area. The New York Times summarizes the 2022 IPCC climate change assessment, stating that these rising sea levels could "exceed what many nations can afford," both in the sense of destroyed land and economic ramifications.

=== Water resources ===
Climate variability is expected to put a number of pressures on water resources in Morocco. Projections indicate 10%-20% decreases in precipitation across the country, with the most severe effects being felt in the southern region. Of the 140 billion cubic meters (BCM) of water which fall on Morocco yearly, 118 BCM are lost to evaporation before they can be used by the communities. Additionally, climate change will reduce snowpack in the Atlas Mountains, reducing water supplies while demand factors such as population expansion, urban growth, industry, and tourism, continue to strain the overall water budget. Furthermore, many coastal aquifers will increasingly become stressed because of coastal salinization.

According to the World Resources Institute, Morocco will reach very high level of water stress around 2040.

Morocco experienced an unprecedented heat wave in spring 2022, with temperatures far above the seasonal average, attributed to climate change. A dry winter and a five-year trend of declining annual rainfall have contributed to severe water scarcity and adversely affected the agricultural sector. The rise in temperatures is linked to increased greenhouse gas emissions, deforestation, and urbanization.

Imider, a water-stressed community in Morocco's southeast, faces climate change-induced water scarcity. The indigenous Amazigh people have traditionally depended on an efficient irrigation system known as 'khettara,' but rising temperatures and drought, along with phosphate and silver mining in the region, threaten this centuries-old method.

==== Ecosystems ====
===== Lagoon =====
Lagoon systems face a heightened risk to sea level rise across Morocco. The Nador Lagoon is one of the largest in Morocco and works to block the high salinity of the Mediterranean and protect the mainland from sea level rise through a barrier island, which averages 350m in width. These lagoons are vital to the protection of the mainland coastline and the country's water supply, but have become increasingly vulnerable to the effects of climate change.

===== Oasis =====
Oasis ecosystems are complex and fragile, but they have historically thrived in Morocco due to the arid climate and rare rainfall. Climate variability and human-induced climate change has become a major threat to Morocco's oasis ecosystems. Palm groves once dominated the Moroccan oases, but over the last century, have dcreased in land area by nearly two thirds. Date palms, produced by these groves, used to be a major crop exported by the country but have seen a marked decrease in yields over the recent decades due to drought, soil degradation, and disease. The Middle Drâa Valley contains one of the most vital oases in Morocco and is about 15,000 ha in total area. The soils found in these systems are very fertile because they were formed in river deltas, and they have been used for farmland. Farming on this land has now become extremely water intensive. A new push to restore the natural ecosystem has in hopes of regenerating biodiversity and saving water.

== Impacts on people ==
=== Economy ===
==== Agriculture ====
The agricultural system in Morocco is especially vulnerable to climate change. Crop production is primarily (87%) from rainfed agriculture. A 2016 drought resulted in 70% decreases in crop yields, and slowed the economy. Morocco struggles with malnutrition and has a diet which consists of 58% in volume in wheat products and bread. This diet is extremely important both culturally and for caloric intake: 71% of daily calories for the average person living in Morocco comes from wheat. To meet this large demand, Morocco imports 40% of the country's wheat products. The other 60% of agriculture makes up almost 40% of the working population state-wide, and 74% in rural areas. The vulnerability which oasis ecosystems face is directly threatening the jobs of Moroccan farmers. Being able to farm in a prosperous way is only becoming more difficult as climate change progresses, negatively affecting food security nationally.

==== Tourism ====
Tourism is the second largest contributor to GDP in Morocco, but the industry is declining due to climate change. Tourism counts for 8.2% of Moroccos GDP as of 2017 and creates 7.1% of jobs. Increasing temperatures are expected to diminish the popularity of Morocco as a tourist destination. Sea level rise is also expected to damage infrastructure in the coastal regions in coming years, much of which is used for tourism purposes. The loss of fresh water resources is also closely tied with the countries recent struggles with tourism. Golf courses require more water every year, with an 88% growth in water required from the year 2005 to 2015.

=== Society ===
==== Health ====
Several health risks accompany other well-known climate change impacts. A 2015 WHO report highlights flooding, infectious disease, heat, and air pollution as some of the many health-related impacts of climate change in Morocco. Sea-level rise drives an increased exposure to flooding events, and in turn can result in death, decreased food production, increased infectious disease outbreaks, and population displacement, among other impacts. Infectious diseases and their vectors are expected to worsen with climate change, as control programs and health interventions aim to curb such growth. As favorable conditions for vectors expand geographically, the vectors tend to find those newly suitable conditions. In Morocco, the vector-borne disease cutaneous leishmaniases have become increasingly burdensome, with "24,804 cases due to L. major CL, 16,852 cases due to L. tropica CL and 1366 cases caused by L. infantum VL...recorded between 2004 and 2013." Cases of the disease recently spread from the east to west within Morocco, and continue to be a significant health risk. A 2013 study found that rising minimum temperatures have "created conditions suitable for endemicity that did not previously exist" for Phlebotomize sand flies, the disease's main vector. IPCC warns about mosquito-borne diseases, including malaria and Zika due to climate change in East Africa. A 2021 World Bank report adds dengue fever and schistosomiasis to that list. Rising average annual temperatures also threaten an increase in heat-related illnesses, as heat waves and droughts are expected to become more frequent and intense. Outdoor and indoor air pollution both present significant threats to health in Morocco.

Migration and urbanization

Climate change is causing a mass migration across Morocco, generally from rural areas to cities, but also from more affected rural areas to less affected. Migration within Morocco is a major undertaking for people young and old: Whereas young people tend to think of it as an opportunity, older people perceive it as leaving behind lives, routines, communities, and rich social networks. Migration within Morocco is characterized by urbanization, just as it is globally. Thus, cities are growing rapidly. This pattern of urban growth is expected to continue in the face of climate change impacts, such as natural disasters, prompting a push by the government to emphasize the use of urban resilience and disaster risk management (DRM) strategies as cities expand. However, a problem accompanying rapid urbanization in Morocca is affordable housing. As of 2021, Morocco has faced a shortage of about 400,000 affordable housing units, with around 9.2% of the urban population forced to live in substandard and/or informal housing with few opportunities for improvement.

==== Gendered impacts ====
Climate change in Morocco has disproportionate effects on women, who are more likely to be responsible for water collection, household resource management, and unpaid care work, and who constitute a significant share of agricultural labor. Prolonged droughts and water scarcity increase time burdens, constrain access to education and income, and reduce decision-making power in resource management, especially where women have limited land ownership.

==== Cultural and religious practices ====
Government water-restriction measures have at times led to the closure of Moroccan bathhouses (hammams), which hold significant cultural importance, including in pre-wedding ceremonies and religious purification practices.

In February 2025, amid a multi-year drought and livestock shortages, the monarch urged Moroccans to forgo the traditional Eid al-Adha sheep sacrifice, citing climatic and economic pressures, an unusual step that highlighted climate change's reach into social and religious practices.

== Mitigation and adaptation ==
=== Renewable energy ===
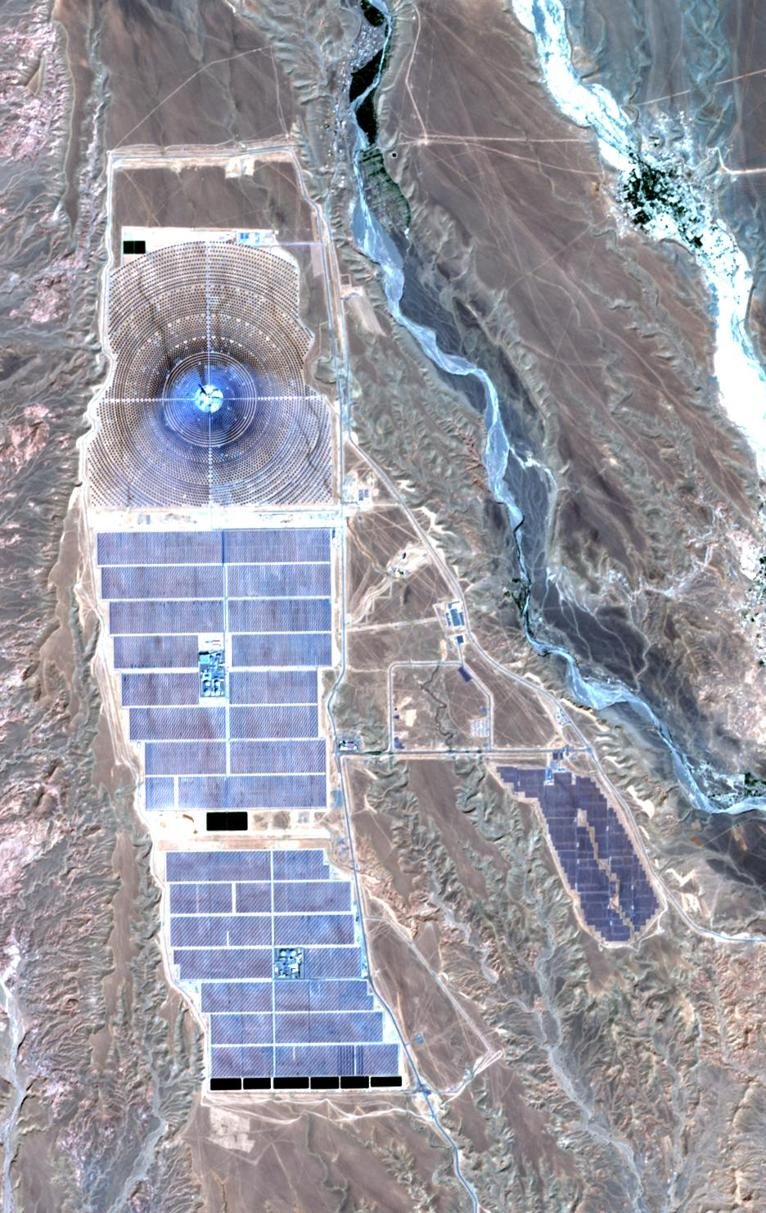
Ouarzazate Solar Power Station.

Morocco identified the transportation, household energy, industry, livestock, and energy sectors as priority areas for mitigation. Morocco is dependent on imported energy, and almost 90% of its energy in 2022 came from these imported fuels. In 2022, fossil fuels are the country's most prominent energy source, providing around 63% of Morocco's energy needs. Morocco is accelerating the replacement of coal and gas in its electricity mix. Renewable energy technologies are one of the key pillars in Morocco's mitigation strategy. Renewables account for about 37% of Morocco's energy mix, with hydropower contributing the highest amount, at 16.14%, followed by wind power at 13.37%, and finally, solar at 7.58%. Another primary strategy for mitigation in Morocco is reducing energy use. The government hopes to reduce energy use 15% from 2016 levels to 2030.

In 2018, the Moroccan Agency for Sustainable Energy (MASEN), the First National Operation & Maintenance Company (NOMAC), and the International Company for Water and Power Projects (ACWA Power) completed construction of the 582 MW Noor Ouarzazate Solar Complex. Included in the complex are the world's largest concentrated solar power(CSP) facility (510 MW) and a 72 MW photovoltaic facility (PV) (completed in 2016). The plant is able to deliver power into the evening hours by using molten salt thermal energy storage. Despite the site's major energy production, the development phase was reportedly problematic due to its environmental and social impacts, as the developers did not effectively engage with the community and compromised the local water source.

In 2021, Morocco released an updated version of its Nationally Determined Contribution (NDC), which aims for renewables to account for 52% of installed electrical power by 2030. Individual targets are set at 20% solar, 20% wind, 12% hydroelectric, and a 20% savings in energy consumption. The new NDC aims to not only contribute to a lower greenhouse gas impact, but to increase Morocco's energy security, due to its heavy reliance on important fossil fuels. Moreover, Morocco's state-owned energy utility, National Office of Electricity and Drinking Water (ONEE), which owns all operations and transmission lines for Morocco's power grid, has overseen some major installments of renewable energy production facilities. Currently, around 16 renewable energy projects have been installed, with 32 in plans.

Construction of a 350 MW Pumped Energy Transfer Station (PETS) in the town of Abdelmoumen, located some 70 km from Agadir, began in April 2018 and was set to complete in 2022 (status unclear at the time of writing). Morocco's ONEE energy utility owns the project, and contractors Vinci Construction and Andritz Hydro were brought on for construction and operation. Worth nearly $317 million, the plant serves as a rapid-response energy facility that will provide around 616 GWh per year to Morocco's southern region of Souss-Massa-Drâa.

=== Energy policy ===
Morocco's energy policy is defined and implemented by several public institutions, primarily the Ministry of Energy Transition and Sustainable Development, with the involvement of sectoral agencies such as the National Office of Hydrocarbons and Mines (ONHYM) and the Office National de l'Électricité et de l'Eau potable (ONEE), which are responsible respectively for hydrocarbons and electricity.

Morocco has limited hydrocarbon reserves, consisting mainly of natural gas, and remains highly dependent on energy imports. Electricity generation has historically relied on thermal power plants using fossil fuels, although the energy mix has undergone significant diversification since the 2010s. Government policy has prioritized the development of renewable energy sources, including hydropower, wind power, and solar energy. National targets initially aimed for a renewable share of 42% of installed electricity capacity by 2020 and 52% by 2030.

== Government policies and legislation ==
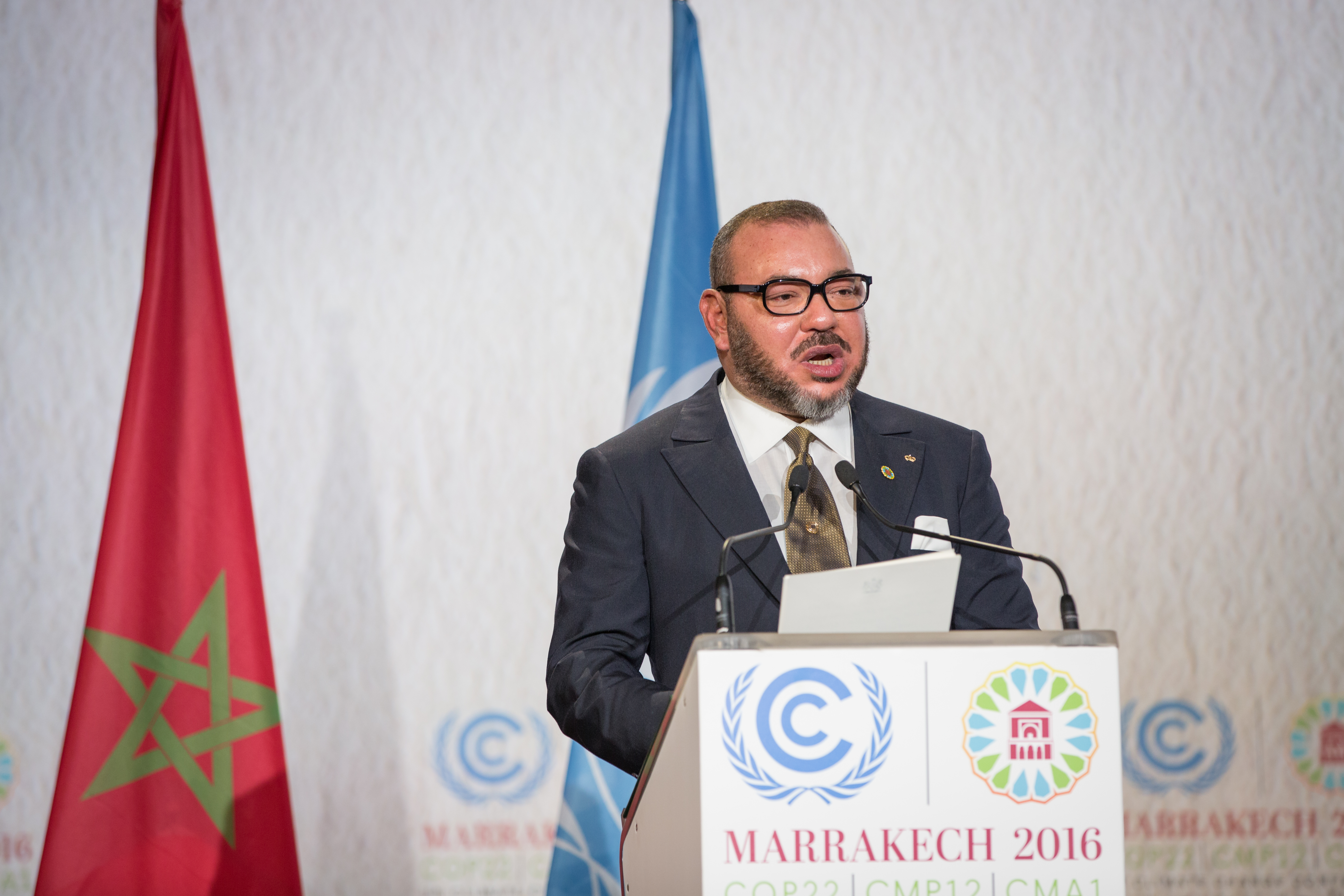
Mohammed VI of Morocco speaking at the 2016 United Nations Climate Change Conference in Marrakesh.

Morocco ranked second in its approach to addressing climate change in the 2018 and 2019 Climate Change Performance Index. (CCPI), Based on 2022 CCPI, Morocco was ranked 8th amongst the 68 countries around the world with an overall score of 71.64% in terms of preparedness for climate change.

The government of Morocco has a Plan Verde strategy in order to cope with climate change. In this plan, the government commits to producing over half of its energy by renewables by 2030, removing subsidies of fossil fuels, committing to green employment, focusing on ocean resource management and preserving aquifers.

Morocco intends to generate 52 percent of its electricity from renewable sources by 2030, with 20 percent coming from solar, 20 percent from wind, and 12 percent from hydropower.

In 2023, Morocco's finance minister, Nadia Fettah Alaoui, highlighted the need to adapt the country's economy to address the escalating threat of climate change. Droughts caused by below-average rainfall linked to climate change have significantly impacted Morocco's agriculture, and the country's economy grew just 1.2% in 2022, down from 7.9% the previous year. To address the water scarcity challenge, the government is focusing on investing in water technologies and further accelerating growth sectors like car manufacturing.

== See also ==
- Climate change in the Middle East and North Africa
