= Harold Powell (entomologist) =

British entomologist

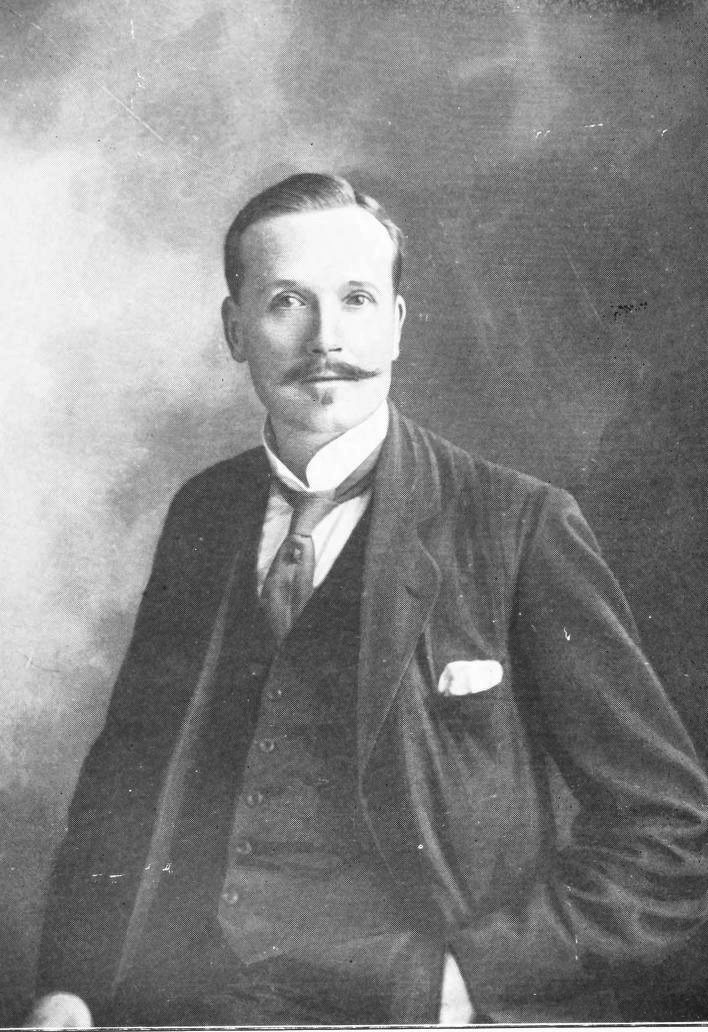
Harold Powell

Harold Powell (1875 in The Mumbles – 1954) was a British entomologist who specialised in Lepidoptera.

Harold Powell was a pharmacist. For part of his life he lived in Hyeres. He collaborated with Charles Oberthur notably on Faune des Lepidopteres de la Barbarie. Etudes de Lepidopterologie comparee, part 10, p. 1-459. Rennes, 1914.

His collection of Lepidoptera from Morocco is held by Service de la Défense des Cultures, Rabat. He was a Fellow of the Royal Entomological Society.

== Selected works ==
- Powell, H., 1909 Notes on the early stages and habits of Pieris manni, Mayer. Ent.Rec. : 37-40
- Powell, H., 1914 Note sur I'abondance de certains Lepidopteres au Maroc au Printemps et en Été 1914. Rev. france. Lepid. vol.11: pagination ? June 1914
- Powell, H., 1914. [Sur les mœurs de Satyrus Semele (Algirica)]. In : Oberthur, C. : Faune des Lépidoptères de la Barbarie.Étud. Lép. comp. 10 : 135-138 (and other parts of the same work)
- Powell, H. 1911. Documents concernant les Somabrachys (famille des Megalopygidae). In Etud. Lepid. Comp., 5:227-301, pi. 84–85, A-D. Rennes C. Oberthur

== See also ==
- Walter Rothschild, 1920 Supplemental notes to Mr. Charles Oberthur's Faune des Lepidopteres de la Barbarie, with lists of the specimens in the Tring Museum Novitates Zoologicae Tring 27: 1-127 (1920) online. Together these remained the only comprehensive work on the butterflies of the Maghreb until 1996- John Tennent The Butterflies of Morocco, Algeria and Tunisia ISBN 0906802059
