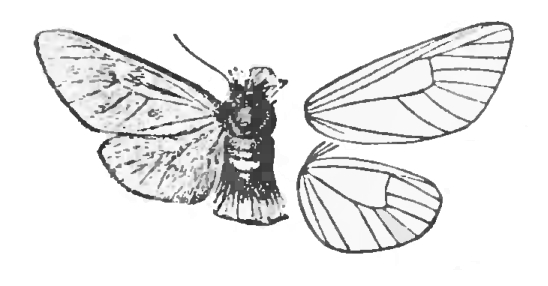
- Psycharium pellucens

Scientific classification
- Kingdom: Animalia
- Phylum: Arthropoda
- Clade: Pancrustacea
- Class: Insecta
- Order: Lepidoptera
- Superfamily: Zygaenoidea
- Family: Somabrachyidae; Hampson, 1920

Genera
- Parapsycharium Geertsema, 2000; Psycharium Herrich-Schäffer, 1856; Somabrachys Kirby, 1892

= Somabrachyidae =

Family of moths

The Somabrachyidae are a family of moths in the order Lepidoptera. Other than Somabrachys aegrota, which also occurs in Spain and on Sicily, the family is Afrotropical.
