= Maghreb =

Region of North Africa; the western half of the Arab world

Maghreb المغرب
- Alternative names: Greater Maghreb; Northwest Africa
- Countries and territories: Algeria; Libya; Mauritania; Morocco; Tunisia; Western Sahara
- Major regional organizations: African Union, Arab League, and Arab Maghreb Union
- Demonym: Maghrebi
- Population estimate: ▲106,510,000 (2023)
- Ethnic groups: Arabs and Berbers
- Languages: Predominantly Arabic; also Berber languages, French, and Spanish
- Religion: Predominantly Sunni Islam; also Judaism, Ibadi Islam, Shia Islam, and Christianity
- Time zones: UTC+00:00 (GMT); UTC+01:00 (CET); UTC+02:00 (EET)

The Maghreb, (Note: /ˈmɑːɡrəb/; Arabic: ْاَلْمَغْرِب, romanized: al-Maghrib, lit. 'the place where the sun sets' [ælˈmaɣrɪb]) sometimes also called the Greater Maghreb (Note: Arabic: المغرب الكبير al-Maghrib al-Kabīr) or Northwest Africa, (Note: See, for example: McKenna, Amy, ed. (2010). The History of Northern Africa. Britannica Educational Publishing. p. 1. ISBN 978-1-61530-397-7.; In English, scholars also use the term "North Africa" to refer to the Maghreb.) is the western part of the Arab world. The Maghreb region comprises western and central North Africa, including Algeria, Libya, Mauritania, Morocco, Tunisia, and the disputed territory of Western Sahara. As of 2018, the region had a population of over 100 million people.

The Maghreb is usually defined as encompassing much of the northern part of continental Africa, including a large portion of the Sahara Desert, while excluding Egypt and the Sudan, which are considered to be located in the Mashriq — the eastern part of the Arab world. The traditional definition of the Maghreb — which restricted its scope to the Atlas Mountains and the coastal Mediterranean plains of Morocco, Algeria, Tunisia and Libya — was expanded in recent decades to today include Mauritania and the disputed territory of Western Sahara. During the era of al-Andalus on the Iberian Peninsula (711–1492), the Maghreb's inhabitants — the Muslim and Jewish Maghrebis — were known by Europeans as the "Moors". The Greeks referred to the region as the "Land of the Atlas", referring to its Atlas Mountains.

Before the establishment of modern states of the region during the 20th century, the Maghreb most commonly referred to a smaller area encompassing Morocco, Algeria, and Tunisia — between the Mediterranean Sea and the Atlas Mountains. It often also included the territory of eastern Libya, and it always excluded what is now considered modern Mauritania. As recently as the early-to-mid 20th century, the term "Maghreb" was exclusively used to refer to the western Mediterranean region of coastal North Africa in general, and to Algeria, Morocco, and Tunisia in particular.

The region comprising the Maghreb was somewhat unified as an independent political entity under the kingdom of Numidia, followed briefly by the Kingdom of Mauretania, then Roman rule. The Germanic Vandals invaded after that, followed by the equally brief re-establishment of a weak Roman rule by the Byzantine Empire. The Islamic caliphates came to power under the Umayyad Caliphate, the Abbasid Caliphate and the Fatimid Caliphate. The most enduring rule was that of the local Arab empires of the Aghlabids, Idrisids, Salihids, Sulaymanids, Umayyads of Cordoba, Hammudids, Nasrids, Saadians, Alawites and the Sennusids, as well as the Berber empires of the Ifranids, Almoravids, Almohads, Hammadids, Zirids, Marinids, Zayyanids, Hafsids and Wattasids, extending from the 8th to 13th centuries. The Ottoman Empire also controlled parts of the region for a period.

Centuries of Arab migrations to the Maghreb since the 7th century shifted the demographic scope of the Maghreb in favor of the Arabs. During the mid-to-late 19th and early 20th centuries, the region was administered by European powers: France (Algeria, Tunisia, most of Morocco, and Mauritania) Italy (Libya), and Spain (northern Morocco and Western Sahara). Italy was expelled from North Africa by the Allies in World War II. Decolonization of the region continued in the decades thereafter, with violent conflicts such as the Algerian War, the Ifni War, and the Western Sahara War.

Algeria, Libya, Mauritania, Morocco, and Tunisia established the Arab Maghreb Union in 1989 to promote cooperation and economic integration in a common market. The union implicitly included Western Sahara under Morocco's membership. However, this progress was short-lived, and the union is now largely dormant. Tensions between Algeria and Morocco over Western Sahara re-emerged, reinforced by the unresolved border dispute between the two countries. These two conflicts have hindered progress on the union's joint goals.

== Terminology ==
The toponym maghrib (Arabic: مغرب) is an Arabic term that the first Muslim Arab settlers gave to the recently conquered area situated west of the Umayyad capital of Damascus in the 7th century AD. The term was used to refer to the region extending from Alexandria in the east to the Atlantic Ocean in the west. Etymologically, it means both "the western place/land" and "the place where the sun sets", in contrast to the Mashriq, the Fertile Crescent and eastern part of the Arab world. In Aḥsan al-Taqāsīm fī Ma'rifat al-Aqālīm (c. 985 AD), medieval Arab geographer Al-Maqdisi used the term Arab regions (Arabic: أَقَالِيمُ ٱلْعَرَبِ) to refer to the lands of Arabia, Iraq, Upper Mesopotamia, Egypt and the Maghreb. This constituted the earliest documented differentiation between the terms Maghreb and Gharb (Muslim lands west of the Abbasid capital, Baghdad). The former referred to the present-day Maghreb whereas the latter incorporated the Levant and Egypt in addition to the Maghreb.

Medieval Muslim historians and geographers divided the Maghreb region into three areas: al-Maghrib al-Adna (the near Maghrib; also known as Ifriqiya), which included the lands extending from Alexandria to Tarabulus (modern-day Tripoli) in the west; al-Maghrib al-Awsat (the middle Maghrib), which extended from Tripoli to Bijaya (Béjaïa); and al-Maghrib al-Aqsa (the far Maghrib), which extended from Tahart (Tiaret) to the Atlantic Ocean. Historians and geographers disagreed, however, over the definition of the eastern boundary. Some authors place it at the sea of Kulzum (the Red Sea) and thus include Egypt and Barqa (Cyrenaica) in the Maghreb. Ibn Khaldun does not accept this definition because, he says, the inhabitants of the Maghreb do not consider Egypt and Barqa as forming part of Maghrib. The latter commences only at the province of Tripoli and includes the districts of which the country of the Berbers was composed in former times. Later Maghribi writers repeated the definition of Ibn Khaldun, with a few variations in details.

The term Maghrib is used in opposition to Mashriq in a sense near to that which it had in medieval times, but it also denotes simply Morocco when the full al-Maghrib al-Aqsa is abbreviated. Certain politicians seek a political union of the North African countries, which they call the Greater Maghrib (Arabic: المغرب الكبير, romanized: al-Maghrib al-Kabīr) or the Arab Maghrib (Arabic: المغرب العربي, romanized: al-Maghrib al-ʿArabī).

== History ==
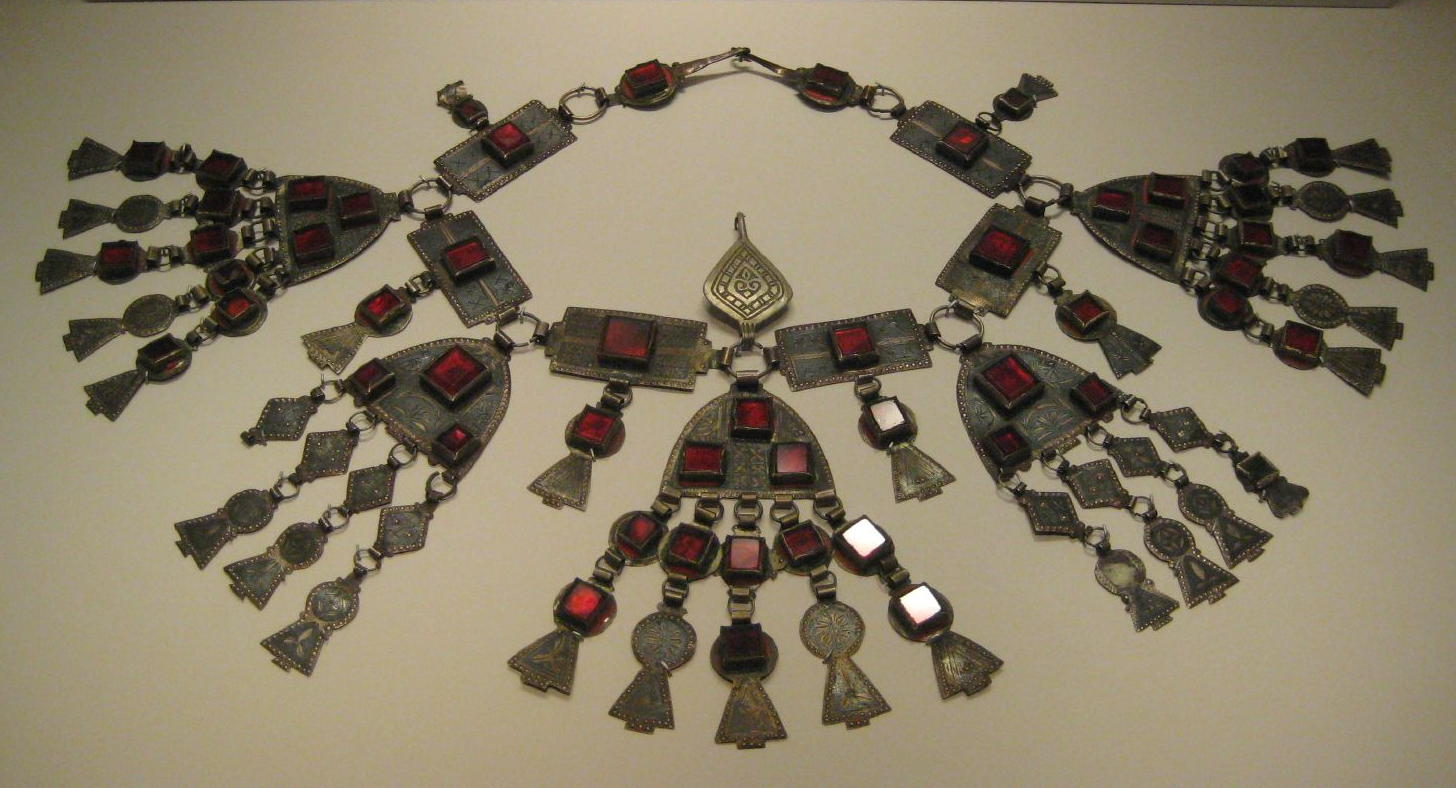
Maghreb head ornament (Morocco)

=== Prehistory ===
Some 9,000 years ago, Earth's tilt was 24.14 degrees, as compared with the current 23.45 degrees. Around 3,500 BC, these changes in the tilt of the Earth's orbit appear to have caused a rapid desertification of the Sahara region forming a natural barrier that severely limited contact between the Maghreb and sub-Saharan Africa. The Berber people have inhabited western North Africa since at least 10,000 BC.

=== Antiquity ===
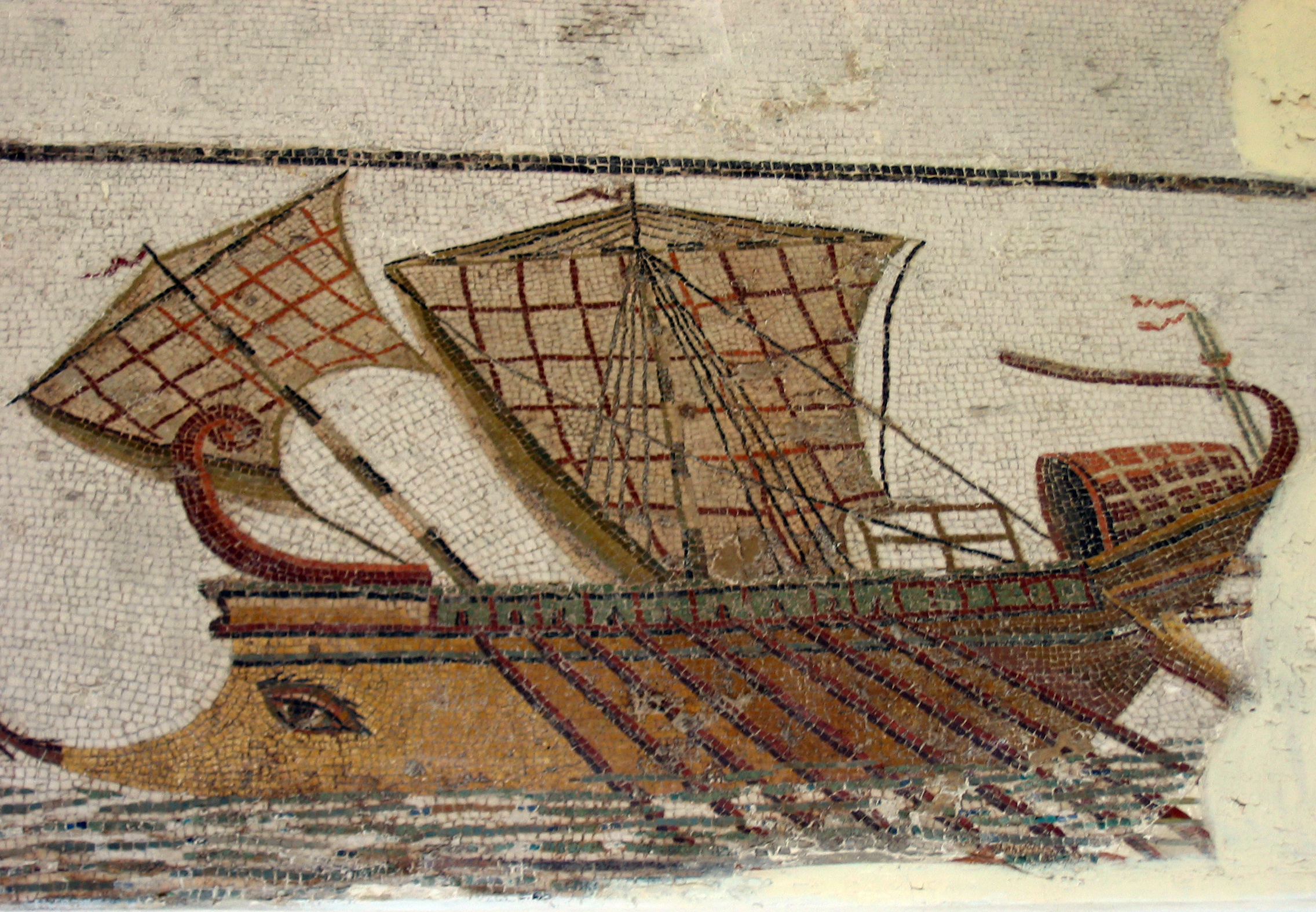
Roman trireme on a mosaic in the Bardo Museum, Tunisia

Isolated from the rest of the continent by the Atlas Mountains (stretching from present-day Morocco to present-day Tunisia) and by the Sahara desert, inhabitants of the northern parts of the Maghreb have long had commercial and cultural ties across the Mediterranean Sea to the inhabitants of the regions of Southern Europe and Western Asia. These trade relations date back at least to the Phoenicians in the 1st millennium BC. (According to tradition, the Phoenicians founded their colony of Carthage (in present-day Tunisia) c. 800 BC).

Phoenicians and Carthaginians arrived for trade. The main Berber and Phoenician settlements centered in the Gulf of Tunis (Carthage, Utica, Tunisia) along the North African littoral, between the Pillars of Hercules and the Libyan coast east of ancient Cyrenaica. They dominated the trade and intercourse of the Western Mediterranean for centuries. Rome's defeat of Carthage in the Punic Wars (264 to 146 BC) enabled Rome to establish the Province of Africa (146 BC) and to control many of these ports. Rome eventually took control of the entire Maghreb north of the Atlas Mountains. Rome was greatly helped by the defection of Massinissa (later King of Numidia, r. 202 – 148 BC) and of Carthage's eastern Numidian Massylii client-allies. Some of the most mountainous regions, such as the Moroccan Rif, remained outside Roman control. Furthermore, during the rule of the Romans, Byzantines, Vandals and Carthaginians the Kabyle people were one of the few ethnic groups in North Africa who remained independent. The Kabyle people were incredibly resistible so much so that even during the Arab conquest of North Africa they still had control and possession over their mountains.

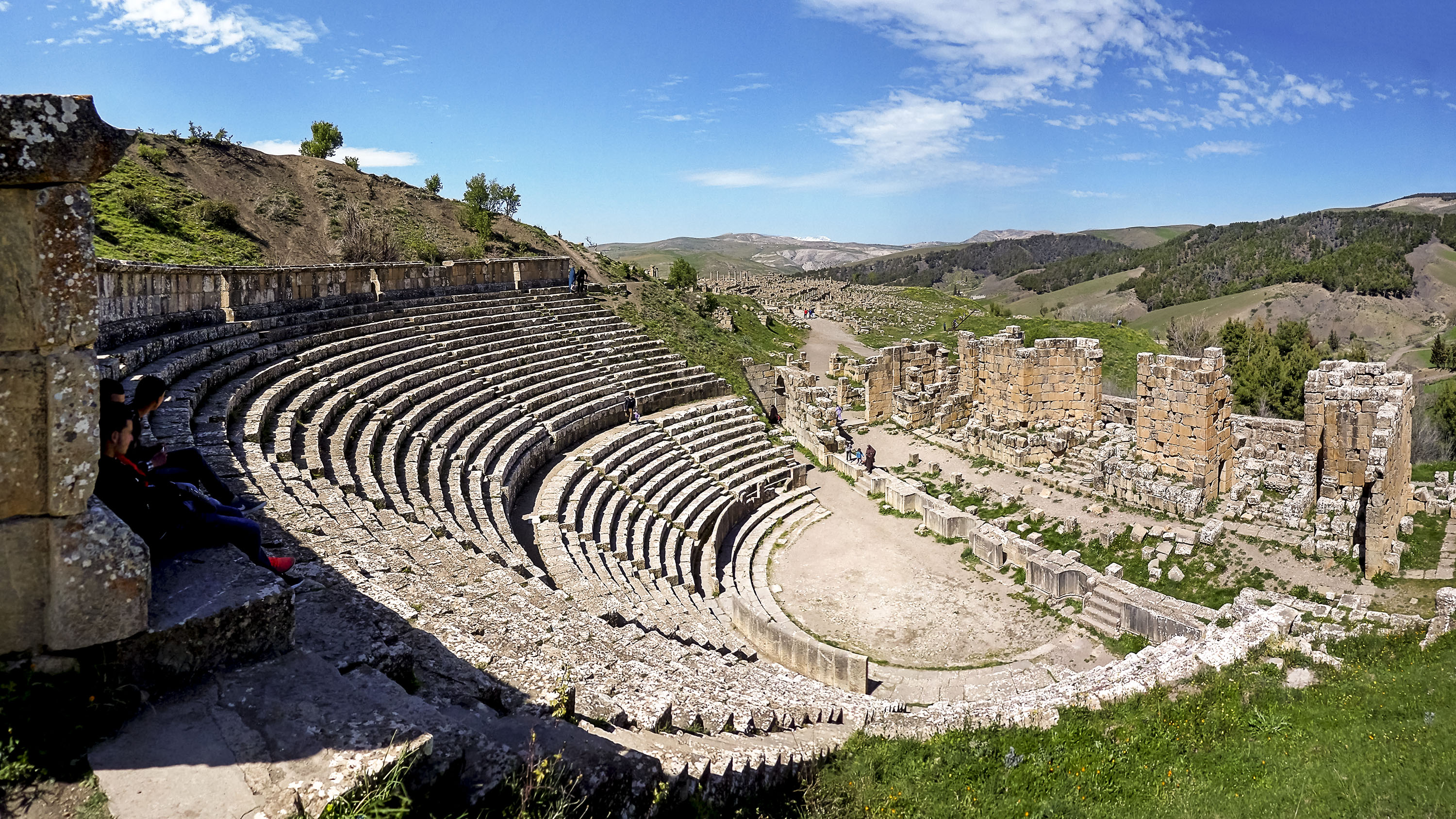
Theater in the Roman town of Cuicul in Djemila

The pressure put on the Western Roman Empire by the barbarian invasions (notably by the Vandals and Visigoths in Iberia) in the 5th century AD reduced Roman control and led to the establishment of the Vandal Kingdom of North Africa in 430 A.D., with its capital at Carthage. A century later, the Byzantine emperor Justinian I sent (533) a force under General Belisarius that succeeded in destroying the Vandal Kingdom in 534. Byzantine rule lasted for 150 years. The Berbers contested the extent of Byzantine control.

After the advent of Islam in Mediterranean North Africa in the period from 639 to 700 AD, Arabs took control of the entire Maghreb region.

=== Middle Ages ===
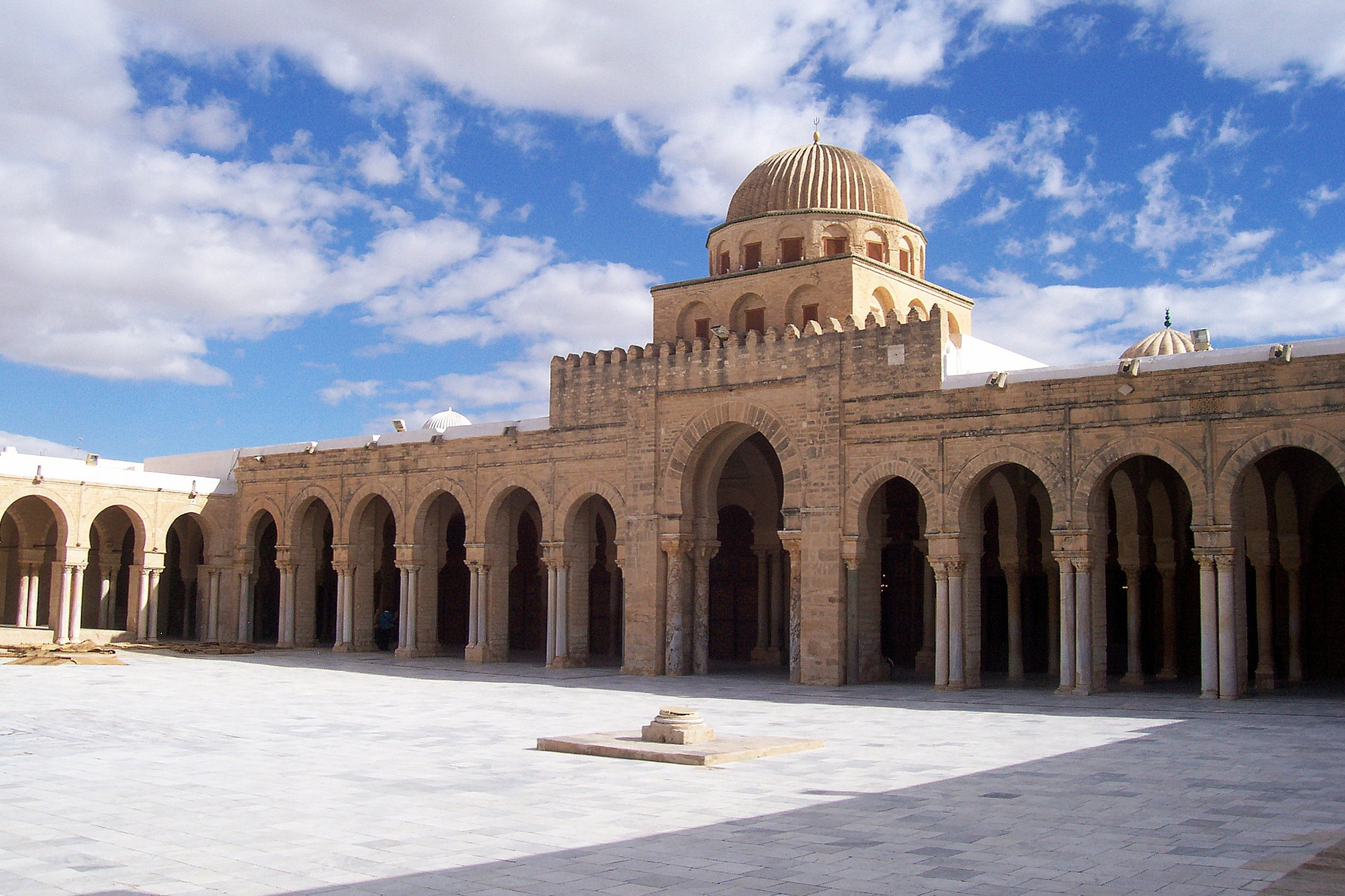
The Great Mosque of Kairouan, founded by the Arab general Uqba Ibn Nafi (in 670), is the oldest mosque in the Maghreb city of Kairouan, Tunisia.

The Arabs reached the Maghreb in early Umayyad times in the 7th century, and from then the Arab migration to the Maghreb began. Islamic Berber kingdoms such as the Almohads expansion and the spread of Islam contributed to the development of trans-Saharan trade. In addition, several Arab dynasties formed in the Maghreb region, such as the Idrisids, Aghlabids, Sulaymanids and more. While restricted due to the cost and dangers, the trade was highly profitable. Commodities traded included such goods as salt, gold, ivory, and slaves. Various Islamic variations, such as the Ibadis and the Shia, were adopted by some Berbers, often leading to scorning of Caliphal control in favour of their own interpretation of Islam.

The invasion of the Banu Hilal and Banu Sulaym Arabs in the 11th century played a major role in spreading Bedouin Arabic to rural areas such as the countryside and steppes, and as far as the southern areas near the Sahara. It also heavily transformed the culture in the Maghreb into Arab culture, and spread Bedouin nomadism in areas where agriculture was previously dominant. These Bedouin tribes accelerated and deepened the Arabization process, since the Berber population was gradually assimilated by the newcomers and had to share with them pastures and seasonal migration paths. By around the 15th century, the region of modern-day Tunisia had already been almost completely Arabized. As Arab nomads spread, the territories of the local Berber tribes were moved and shrank. The Zenata were pushed to the west and the Kabyles were pushed to the north. The Berbers took refuge in the mountains whereas the plains were Arabized. These Arabs had been set upon the Berbers by the Fatimids in punishment for their Zirid former Berber clients who defected and abandoned Shiism in the 11th century. Throughout this period, the Maghreb most often was divided into three states, roughly corresponding to modern Morocco, western Algeria, and eastern Algeria and Tunisia. The Maghreb region was occasionally briefly unified, as under the Almohad Caliphate, Fatimids and briefly under the Zirids. The Hammadids also managed to conquer land in all countries in the Maghreb region.

=== Early modern history ===
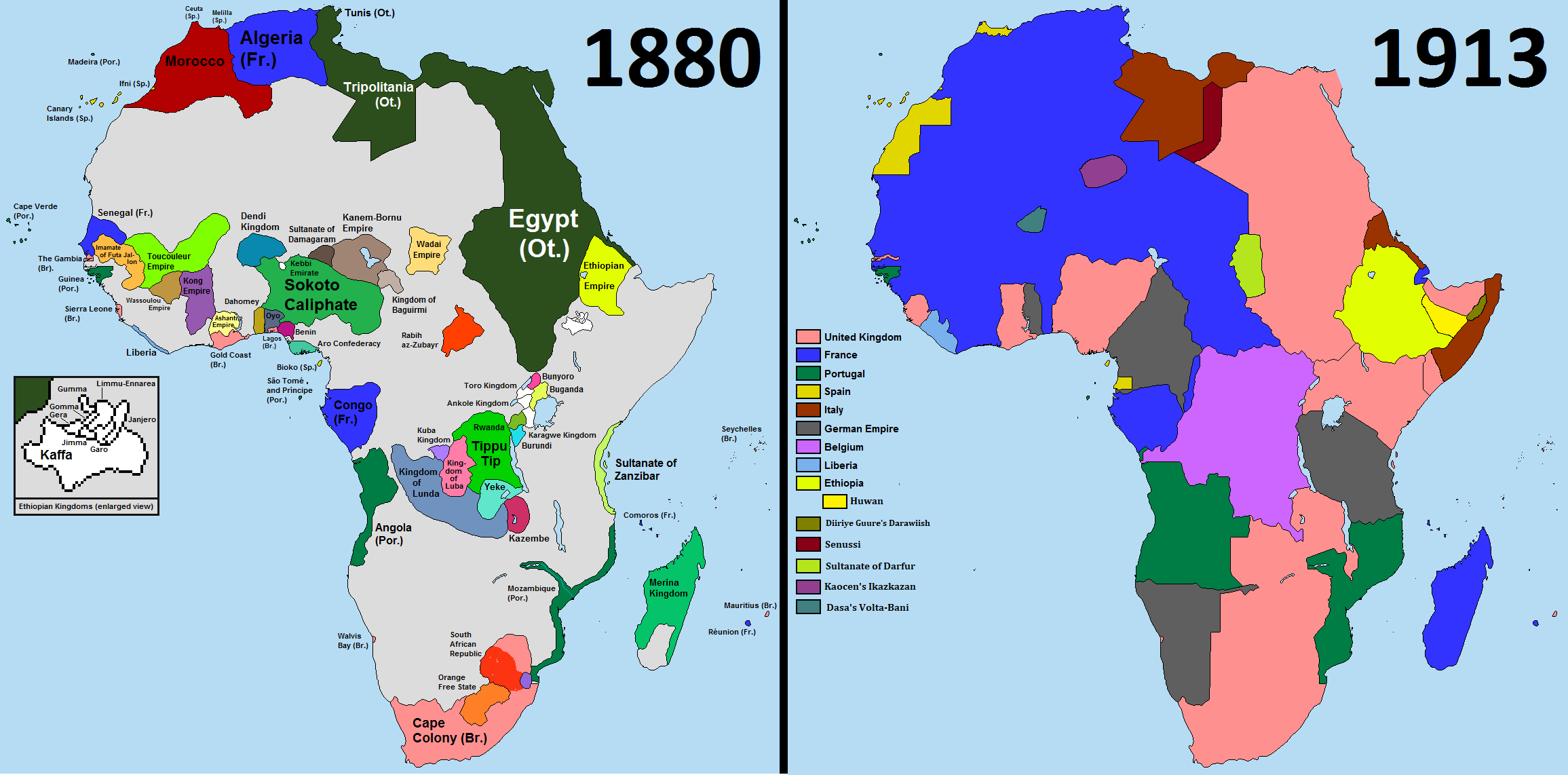
Comparison of Africa in 1880 and 1913, showing the "Scramble for Africa" by the European powers. Until the 19th century, the Ottoman Empire loosely controlled the area east of Morocco.

=== Modern history ===
After the 19th century, areas of the Maghreb were colonized by France, Spain, and later Italy.

Today, more than two and a half million Maghrebis live in France, many from Algeria and Morocco. In addition, as of 1999 there were three million French of Maghrebi origin (defined as having at least one grandparent from Algeria, Morocco, or Tunisia). A 2003 estimate suggests six million French residents were ethnic Maghrebi.

== Geography ==
=== Medieval regions ===
- Djerid
- Draa Valley
- Hodna
- Ifriqiya (currently Tunisia, Constantinois and Tripolitania)
- M'zab
- Rif
- Sous
- Tamesna
- Tripolitania

Outside of the Mediterranean basin and the Arab world, foreign medieval and early modern geographers had comparatively little understanding of the Maghreb; these foreign geographers first believed it to be inhabited by Saracens (a catch-all term for Muslims) and later subdivided the region into the Barbary Coast (the coastal Mediterranean area from Morocco to Libya was home to the Barbary Corsairs), and the Biledulgerid further inland, south of the Atlas Mountains.

=== Ecoregions ===
The Maghreb is divided into a Mediterranean climate region in the north, and the arid Sahara in the south. The Maghreb's variations in elevation, rainfall, temperature, and soils give rise to distinct communities of plants and animals. The World Wide Fund for Nature (WWF) identifies several distinct ecoregions in the Maghreb.

==== Mediterranean Maghreb ====
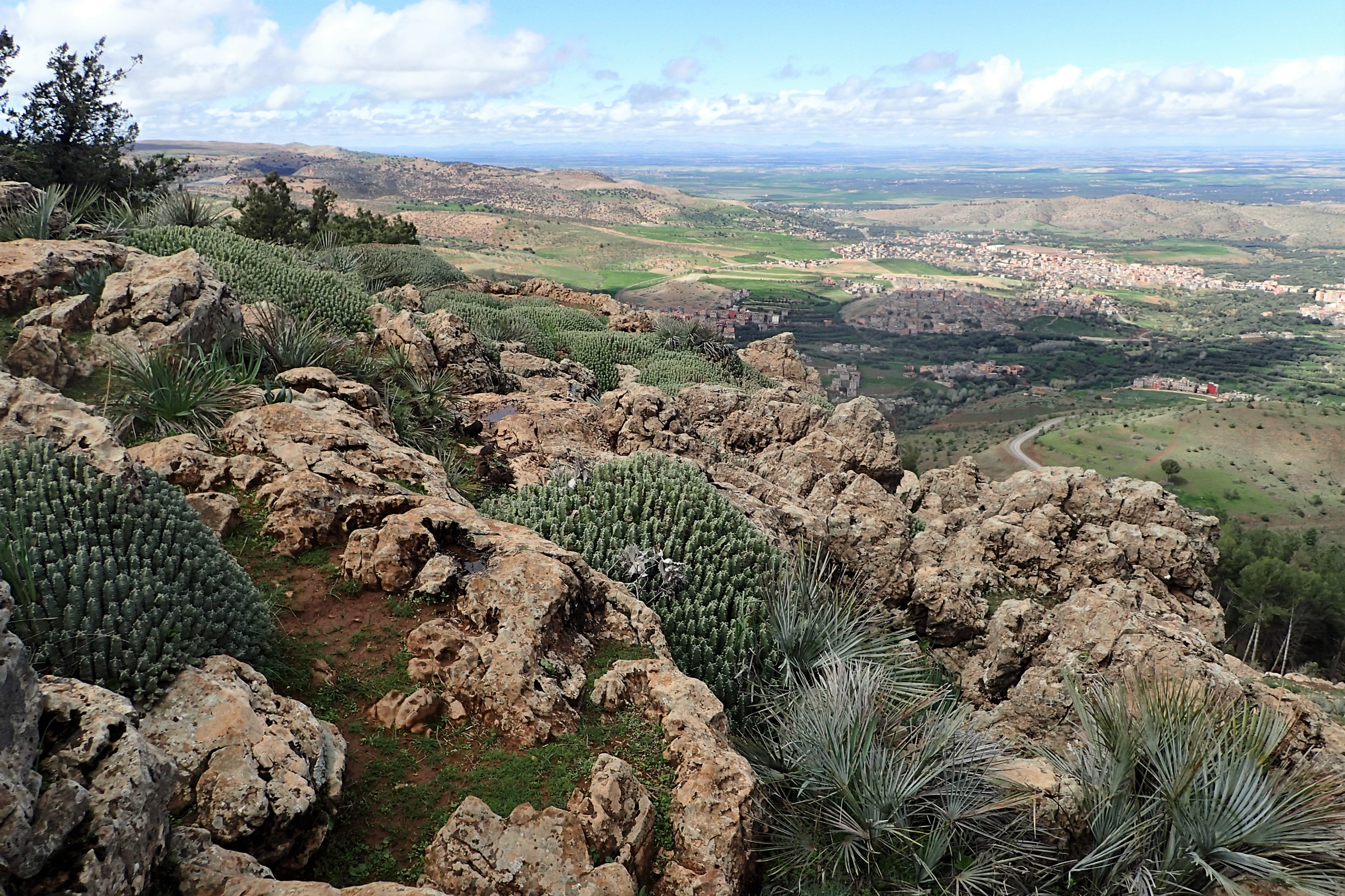
Dwarf fan palm, grown in Maghrebi countries

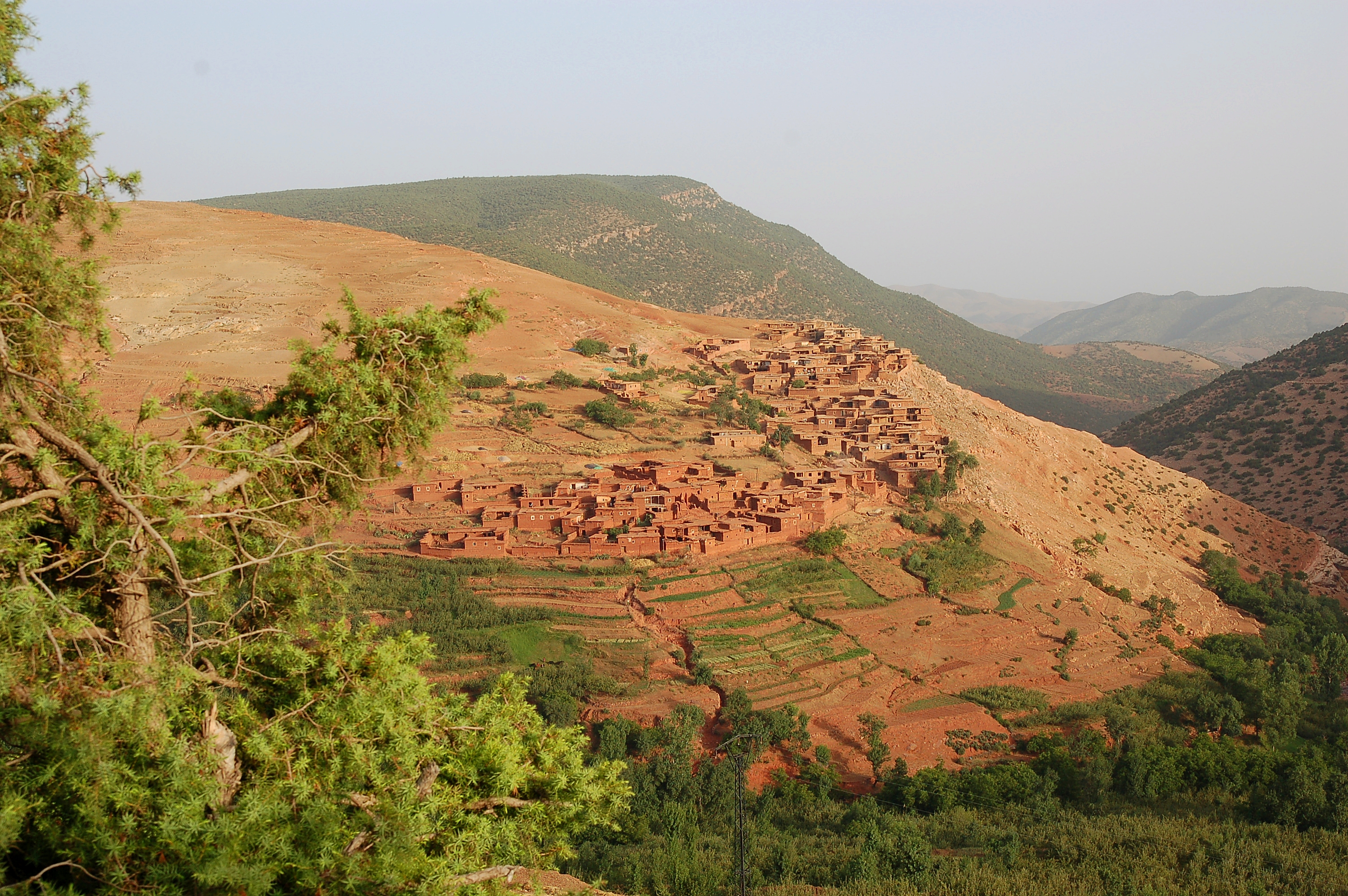
Berber village in the High Atlas mountains of Morocco

The portions of the Maghreb between the Atlas Mountains and the Mediterranean Sea, along with coastal Tripolitania and Cyrenaica in Libya, are home to Mediterranean forests, woodlands, and scrub. These ecoregions share many species of plants and animals with other portions of Mediterranean Basin. The southern extent of the Mediterranean Maghreb corresponds with the 100 mm (3.9 in) isohyet, or the southern range of the European Olive (Olea europea) and Esparto Grass (Stipa tenacissima).

- Mediterranean acacia-argania dry woodlands and succulent thickets (Morocco, Canary Islands (Spain), Western Sahara)
- Mediterranean dry woodlands and steppe (Algeria, Egypt, Libya, Morocco, Tunisia)
- Mediterranean woodlands and forests (Algeria, Libya, Morocco, Tunisia)
- Mediterranean conifer and mixed forests (Algeria, Morocco, Tunisia, Spain)
- Mediterranean High Atlas juniper steppe (Morocco)

==== Saharan Maghreb ====
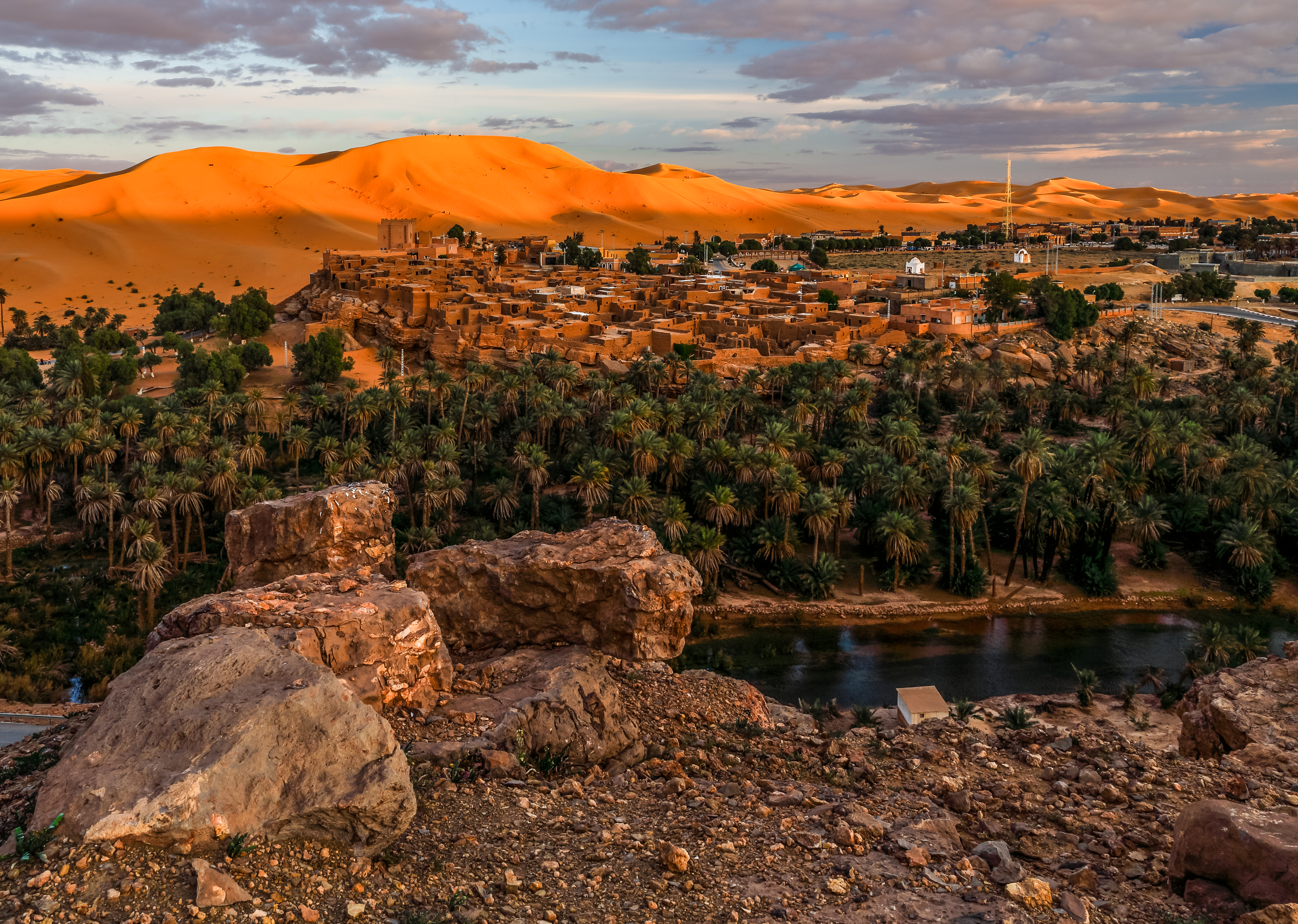
Taghit oasis in Grand Erg Occidental

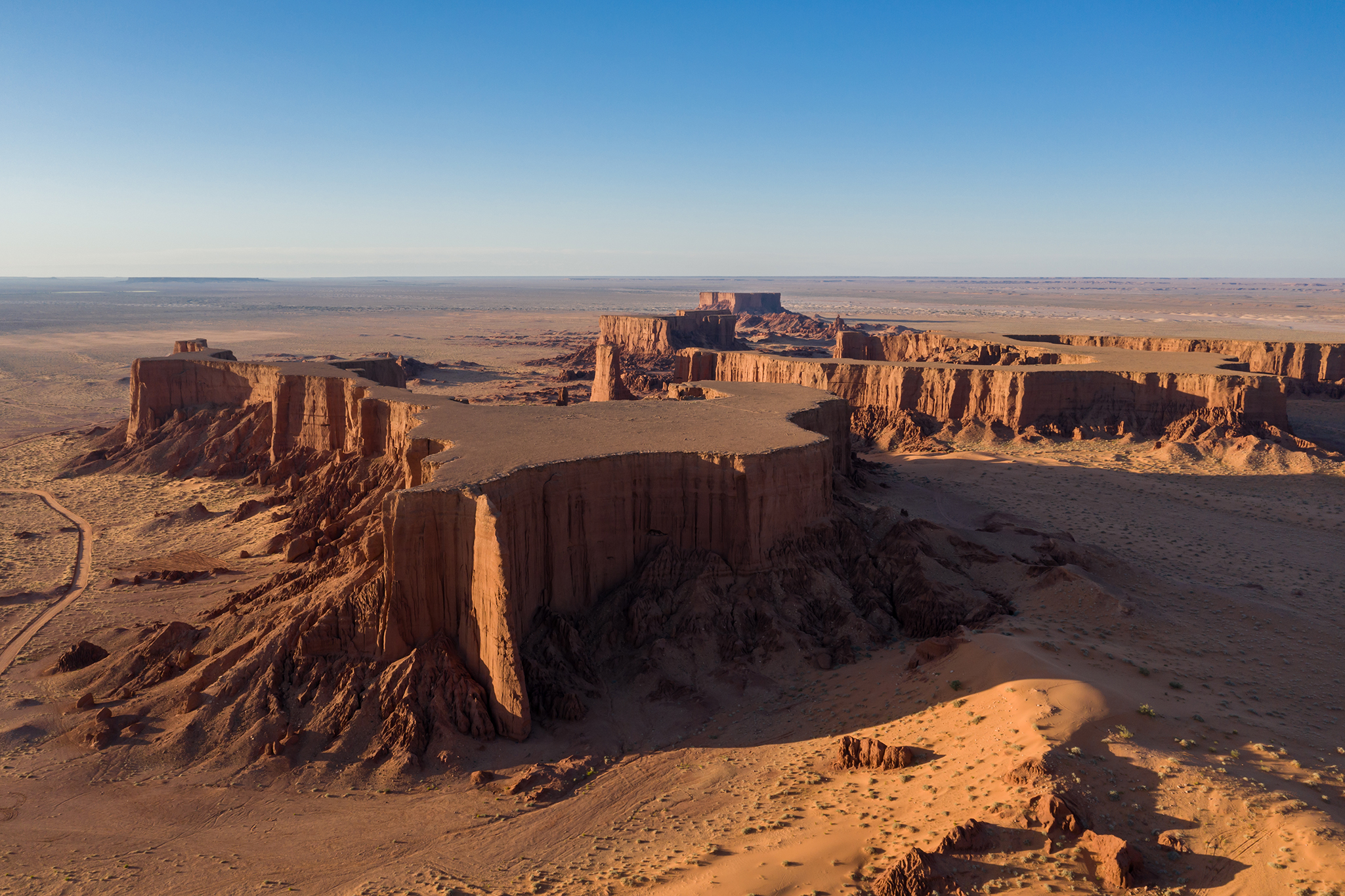
El Gour in El Bayadh Province, Algeria

The Sahara extends across northern Africa from the Atlantic Ocean to the Red Sea. Its central part is hyper-arid and supports little plant or animal life, but the northern portion of the desert receives occasional winter rains, while the strip along the Atlantic coast receives moisture from marine fog, which nourishes a greater variety of plants and animals. The northern edge of the Sahara corresponds to the 100 mm isohyet, which is also the northern range of the date palm (Phoenix dactylifera).

- North Saharan steppe and woodlands: This ecoregion lies along the northern edge of the Sahara, next to the Mediterranean forests, woodlands, and scrub ecoregions of the Mediterranean Maghreb and Cyrenaica. Winter rains sustain shrublands and dry woodlands that form a transition between the Mediterranean climate regions to the north and the hyper-arid Sahara proper to the south. It covers 1,675,300 square km (646,800 square miles) in Algeria, Egypt, Libya, Mauritania, Morocco, Tunisia, and Western Sahara.
- Atlantic coastal desert: The Atlantic coastal desert occupies a narrow strip along the Atlantic coast, where fog generated offshore by the cool Canary Current provides sufficient moisture to sustain a variety of lichens, succulents, and shrubs. It covers 39,900 square kilometres (15,400 sq mi) in Western Sahara and Mauritania.
- Sahara desert: This ecoregion covers the hyper-arid central portion of the Sahara where rainfall is minimal and sporadic. Vegetation is rare, and this ecoregion consists mostly of sand dunes (erg), stone plateaus (hamada), gravel plains (reg), dry valleys (wadi), and salt flats. It covers 4,639,900 square km (1,791,500 square miles) of Algeria, Chad, Egypt, Libya, Mali, Mauritania, Niger, and Sudan.
- Saharan halophytics: Seasonally flooded saline depressions in the Maghreb are home to halophytic, or salt-adapted, plant communities. The Saharan halophytics cover 54,000 square km (20,800 square miles), including Tunisian salt lakes of central Tunisia, Chott Melghir in Algeria, and other areas of Egypt, Algeria, Mauritania, and Western Sahara.

== Demographics ==
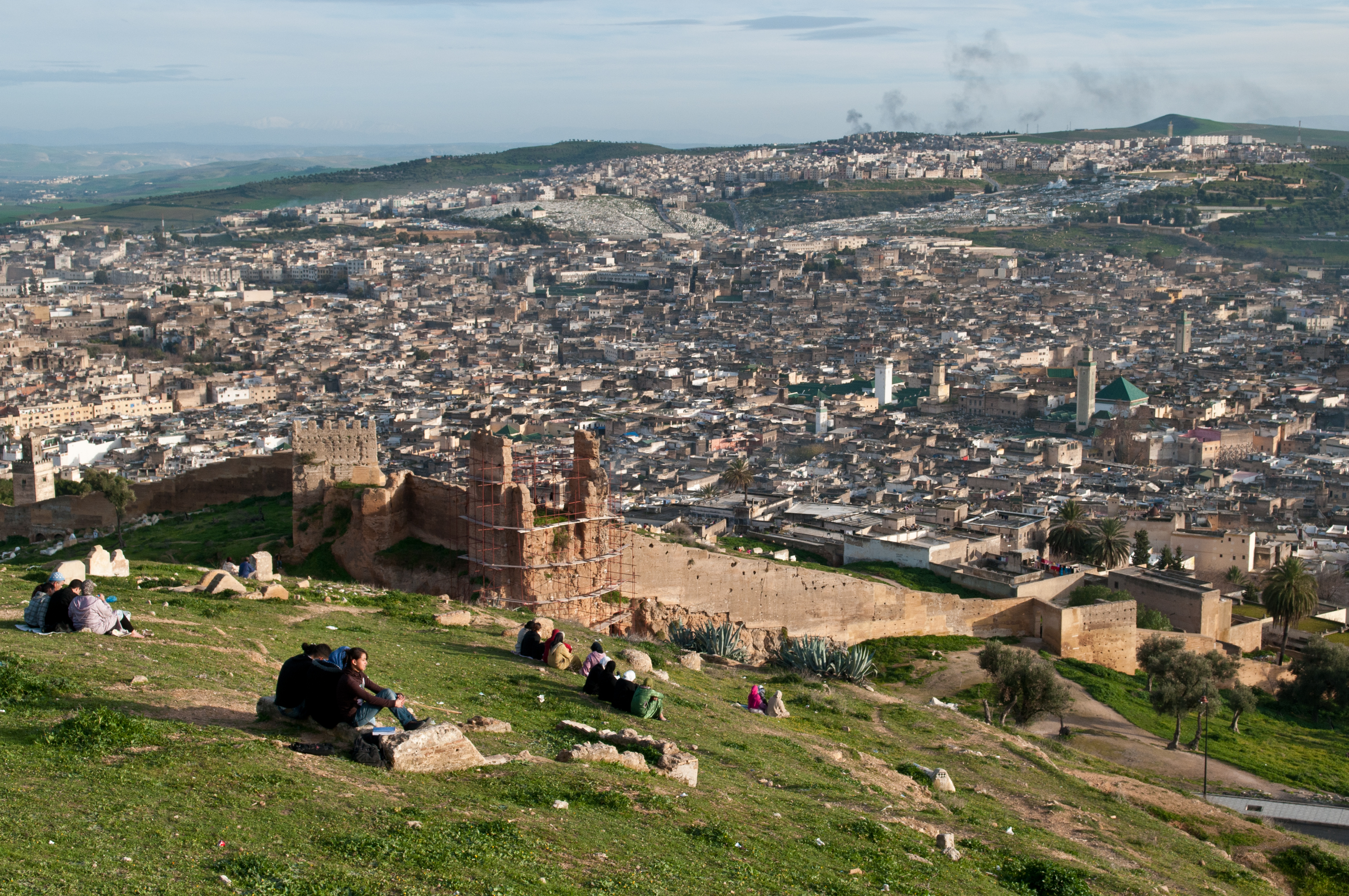
Fez, Morocco

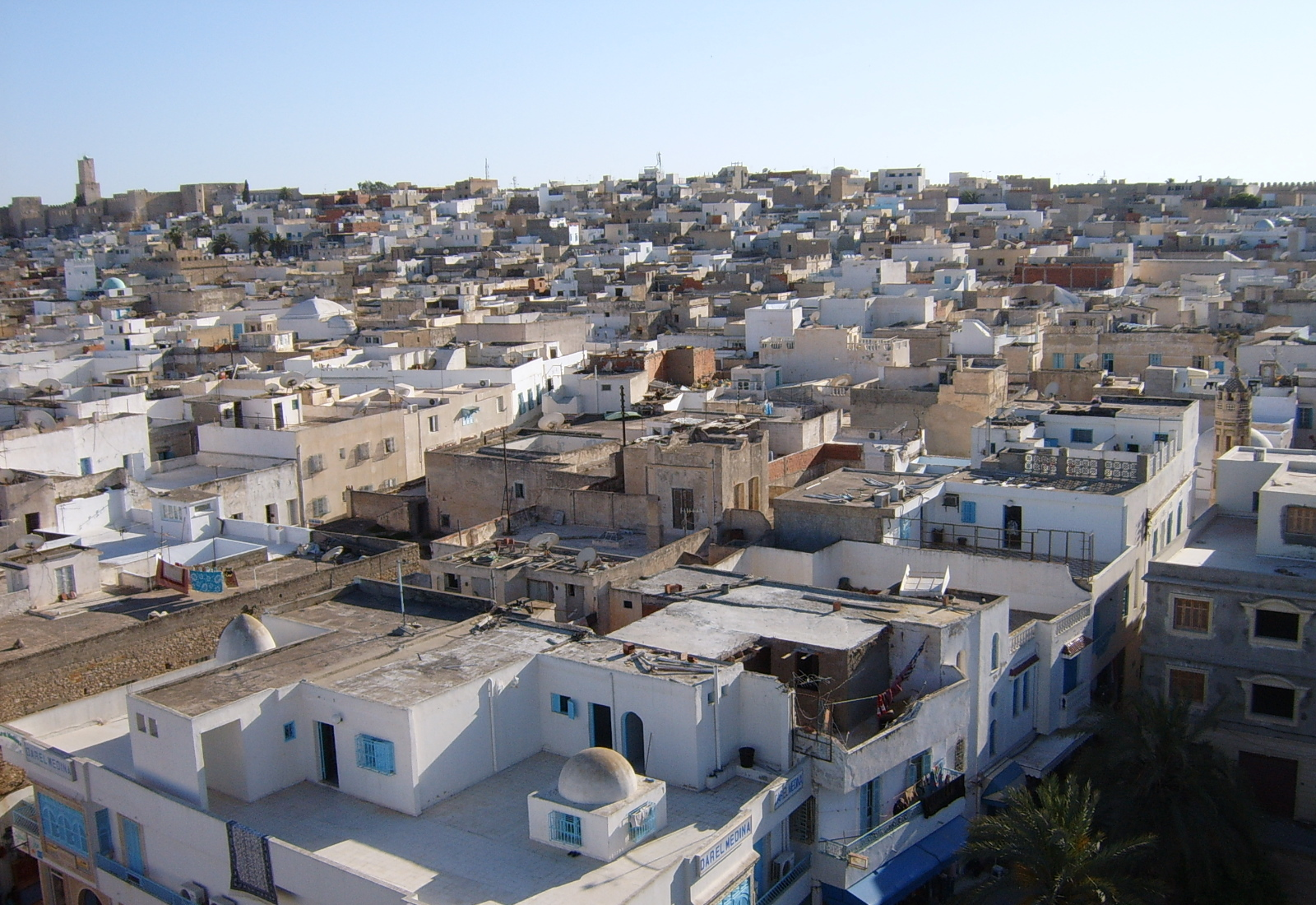
Sousse, Tunisia

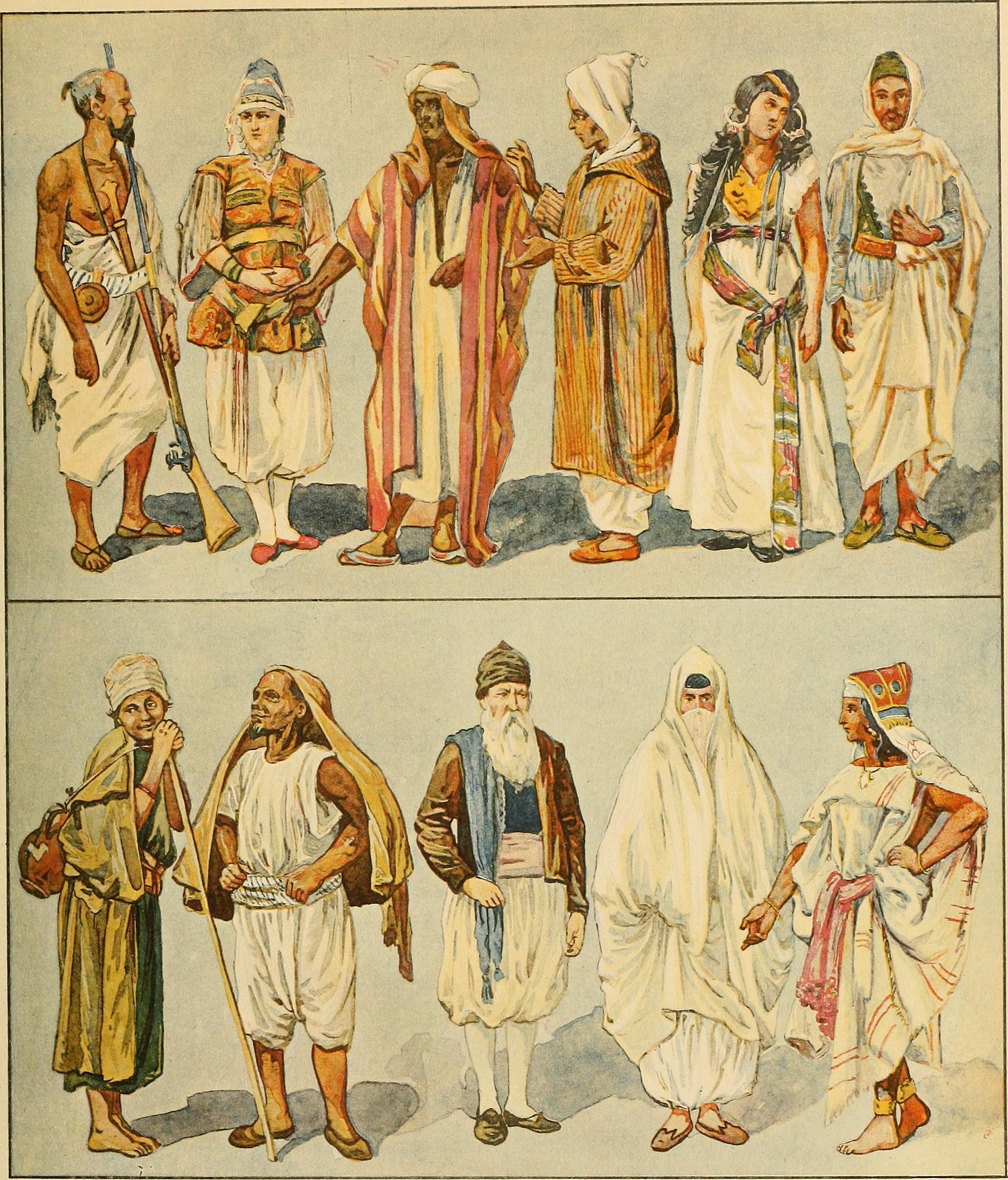
Maghrebis of various ethnicities.

=== Ethnic groups ===
The Maghreb is primarily inhabited by peoples of Arab and Berber ancestral origin. Arabs inhabit Algeria (70% to 80%), Libya (97%), Morocco (44% to 67%), and Tunisia (98%). Berbers inhabit Algeria (20%), Libya (10%), Morocco (35% to 60% ), and Tunisia (1%). Ethnic French, Spanish (particularly Andalusians), Maghrebi Jewish, and Sahelian populations also inhabit the region. Centuries of Arabization and Arab migration to the Maghreb since the 7th century shifted the demographic scope of the Maghreb in favor of the Arabs. Various other influences are also prominent throughout the Maghreb. In northern coastal towns, in particular, several waves of European immigrants influenced the population in the Medieval era. Most notable were the Moriscos and Muladies, that is, the indigenous Spaniards (Moors) who were forcibly converted to Catholicism and later expelled, together with ethnic Arab and Berber Muslims, during the Spanish Catholic Reconquista. Other European contributions included French, Italian, and English crews and passengers taken captive by corsairs. In some cases, they were returned to families after being ransomed; in others, they were used as slaves or assimilated and adopted into tribes.

Historically, the Maghreb was home to significant historic Jewish communities called Maghrebim, who predated the 7th-century introduction and conversion of the region to Islam. The earliest recorded Jewish settlement in the region dates back to the third century BCE under Ptolemaic rule in what is now Libya, although Jewish presence may have begun even earlier. Jewish communities continued to develop throughout the Roman period in present-day Morocco, Algeria, and Tunisia, with evidence of their existence during the early centuries CE. Jews flourished in major urban centers such as Fes, Kairouan, Tunis, and Tétouan despite facing intermittent persecution, notably under the Almohads. The influx of Sephardic Jews from Spain and Portugal, fleeing Christian pogroms, forced conversions, and expulsions in the 14th to 16th centuries, further augmented the Jewish presence in the Maghreb.

During centuries of trans-Saharan trade, Black Africans from the Sahel joined the population mix. Enslaved peoples and traders went to the Maghreb from the region. On the Saharan southern edge of the Maghreb are small communities of Black populations, sometimes called Haratine.

In Morocco, Tunisia, and particularly Algeria, a large European minority, known as the "pied noirs", immigrated to the region, settling under French colonial rule in the late 19th century. As of the last census in French-ruled Algeria, taken on 1 June 1960, there were 1,050,000 non-Muslim civilians (mostly Catholic, but including 130,000 Algerian Jews) in Algeria, 10 percent of the total population. They established farms and businesses. The overwhelming majority of these, however, left Algeria during and following the war for independence.

Compared to the population of France, the Maghrebi population was one-eighth of France's population in 1800, one-quarter in 1900, and equal in 2000. The Maghreb is home to one percent of the global population as of 2010.

Turks also form a significant group in the Mediterranean Maghreb; this community migrated with the expansion of the Ottoman Empire.

=== Genetics ===
The Y-chromosome genetic structure of the Maghreb population seems to be modulated chiefly by geography. The Y-DNA Haplogroups E1b1b and J make up the vast majority of the genetic markers of the populations of the Maghreb. Haplogroup E1b1b is the most frequent among Maghrebi groups, especially the downstream lineage of E1b1b1b1a, which is typical of the indigenous Berbers of North-West Africa. Haplogroup J1 is the second most frequent among Maghrebi groups and is more indicative of Middle East origins, and has its highest distribution among populations in Arabia and the Levant. Due to the distribution of E-M81(E1b1b1b1a), which has reached its highest documented levels in the world at 95–100% in some populations of the Maghreb, it has often been termed the "Berber marker" in the scientific literature. The second most common marker, Haplogroup J, especially J1, which is typically Middle Eastern and originates in the Arabian peninsula, can reach frequencies of up to 35% in the region. Its highest density is found in the Arabian Peninsula. Haplogroup R1, a Eurasian marker, has also been observed in the Maghreb, though with lower frequency. The Y-DNA haplogroups shown above are observed in both Arabic speakers and Berber-speakers.

DNA studies of Iberomaurusian peoples at Taforalt, Morocco dating to around 15,000 years ago have found them to have a distinctive Maghrebi ancestry formed from a mixture of Near Eastern and African ancestry, which is still found as a part of the genome of modern Northwest Africans. A 2025 study sequenced individuals from Takarkori (7,000 YBP) and discovered that most of their ancestry was from an unknown Ancestral North African lineage, related to the African admixture component found in Iberomaurusians. According to the study, the Takarkori people were distinct from both contemporary sub-Saharan Africans and non-Africans/Eurasians. They had "only a minor component of non-African ancestry" but did "not carry sub-Saharan African ancestry, suggesting that, contrary to previous interpretations, the Green Sahara was not a corridor connecting Northern and sub-Saharan Africa."

Later during the Neolithic, from around 7,500 years ago onwards, there was a migration into Northwest Africa of European Neolithic Farmers from the Iberian Peninsula (who had originated in Anatolia several thousand years prior), as well as pastoralists from the Levant, both of whom also significantly contributed to the ancestry of modern Northwest Africans. The proto-Berber tribes evolved from these prehistoric communities during the late Bronze- and early Iron ages.

==== Haplogroup E ====
Haplogroup E is thought to have emerged in prehistoric North Africa or East Africa, and would have later dispersed into West Asia. The major subclades of haplogroup E found amongst Berbers belong to E-Z827, which is believed to have emerged in North Africa. Common subclades include E1b1b1a, E1b1b1b and E1b1b1*. E1b1b1b is distributed along a west-to-east cline with frequencies that can reach as high as 100 percent in Northwest Africa. E1b1b1a has been observed at low to moderate frequencies among Berber populations with significantly higher frequencies observed in Northeast Africa relative to Northwest Africa. Loosdrecht et al. 2018 demonstrated that E1b1b is most likely indigenous to North Africa and migrated from North Africa to the Near East during the Paleolithic.

==== Haplogroup J1 ====
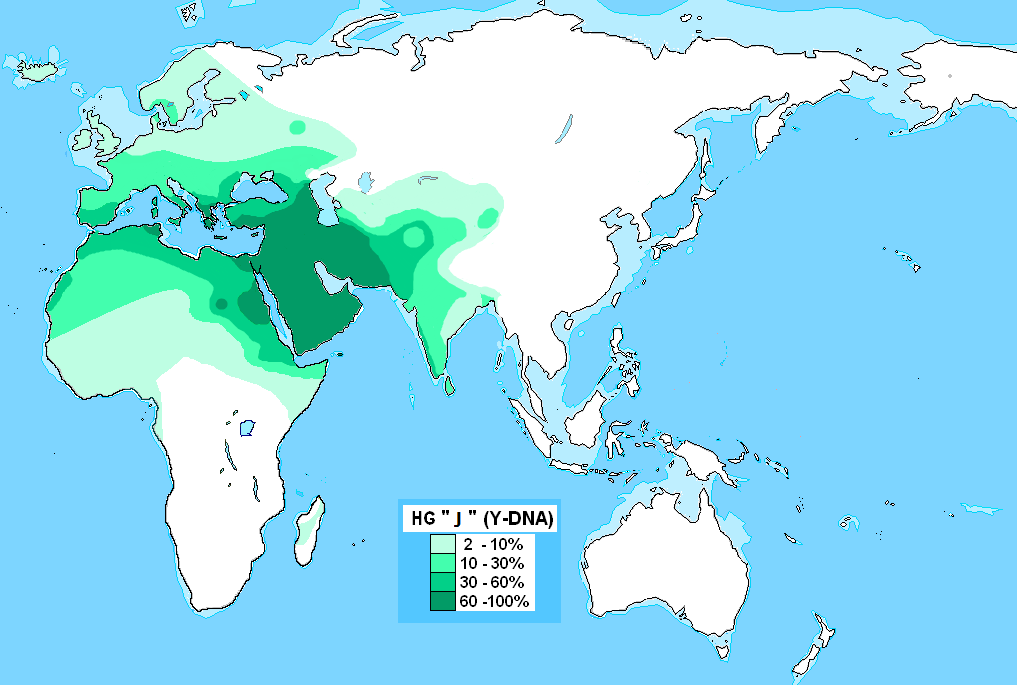
Distribution of Haplogroup J (Y-DNA)

Haplogroup J-M267 is another very common haplogroup in the Maghreb, being the second most-frequent haplogroup in the Maghreb. It originated in the Middle East, and its highest frequency of 30%–62.5% has been observed in Muslim Arab populations in the Middle East. A study found out that the majority of J1 (Eu10) chromosomes in the Maghreb are due to the recent gene flow caused by the Arab migrations to the Maghreb in the first millennium CE. The J-M267 chromosome pool in the Maghreb is derived not only from early Neolithic dispersions but to a much greater extent from recent expansions of Arab tribes from the Arabian Peninsula, during which both southern Qahtanite and northern Adnanite Arabs added to the heterogenous Maghrebi ethnic melting pot. A study from 2017 suggested that these Arab migrations were a demographic process that heavily implied gene flow and remodeled the genetic structure of the Maghreb, rather than a mere cultural replacement as claimed by older studies.

Recent genome-wide analysis of North Africans found substantial shared ancestry with the Middle East, and to a lesser extent sub-Saharan Africa and Europe. The recent gene flow caused by the Arab migrations to the Maghreb increased genetic similarities between Maghrebis and Middle Easterners. Haplogroup J1-M267 accounts for around 30% of Maghrebis and has spread from the Arabian Peninsula, second after E1b1b1b which accounts for 45% of Maghrebis. A study from 2021 has shown that the highest frequency of the Middle Eastern component ever observed in North Africa so far was observed in the Arabs of Wesletia in Tunisia, who had a Middle Eastern component frequency of 71.8%. According to a study from 2004, Haplogroup J1 had a frequency of 35% in Algerians and 34.2% in Tunisians.

==== Table ====
The Maghreb Y chromosome pool (including both Arab and Berber populations) may be summarized for most of the populations as follows, where only two haplogroups E1b1b and J comprise generally more than 80% of the total chromosomes:

Haplogroup	Marker	Sahara/Mauritania	Morocco	Algeria	Tunisia	Libya
n		189	760	156	601	–
A		–	0.26	–	–	–
B		0.53	0.66	–	0.17	–
C		–	–	–	–	–
DE		–	–	–	–	–
E1a	M33	5.29	2.76	0.64	0.5	–
E1b1a	M2	6.88	3.29	5.13	0.67	–
E1b1b1	M35	–	4.21	0.64	1.66	–
E1b1b1a	M78	–	0.79	1.92	–	–
E1b1b1a1	V12	–	0.26	0.64	–	–
E1b1b1a1b	V32	–	–	–	–	–
E1b1b1a2	V13	–	0.26	0.64	–	–
E1b1b1a3	V22	–	1.84	1.28	3	–
E1b1b1a4	V65	–	3.68	1.92	3.16	–
E1b1b1b	M81	65.56	67.37	64.23	72.73	–
E1b1b1c	M34	11.11	0.66	1.28	1.16	–
F	M89	–	0.26	3.85	2.66	–
G	M201	–	0.66	–	0.17	–
H	M69	–	–	–	–	–
I		–	0.13	–	0.17	–
J1		3.23	6.32	1.79	6.64	–
J2		–	1.32	4.49	2.83	–
K		–	0.53	0.64	0.33	–
L		–	–	–	–	–
N		–	–	–	–	–
O		–	–	–	–	–
P, R		–	0.26	–	0.33	–
Q		–	–	0.64	–	–
R1a1		–	–	0.64	0.5	–
R1b	M343	–	–	–	–	–
R1b1a	V88	6.88	0.92	2.56	1.83	–
R1b1b	M269	0.53	3.55	7.04	0.33	–
R2		–	–	–	–	–
T	M70	–	–	–	1.16	–

== Religion ==
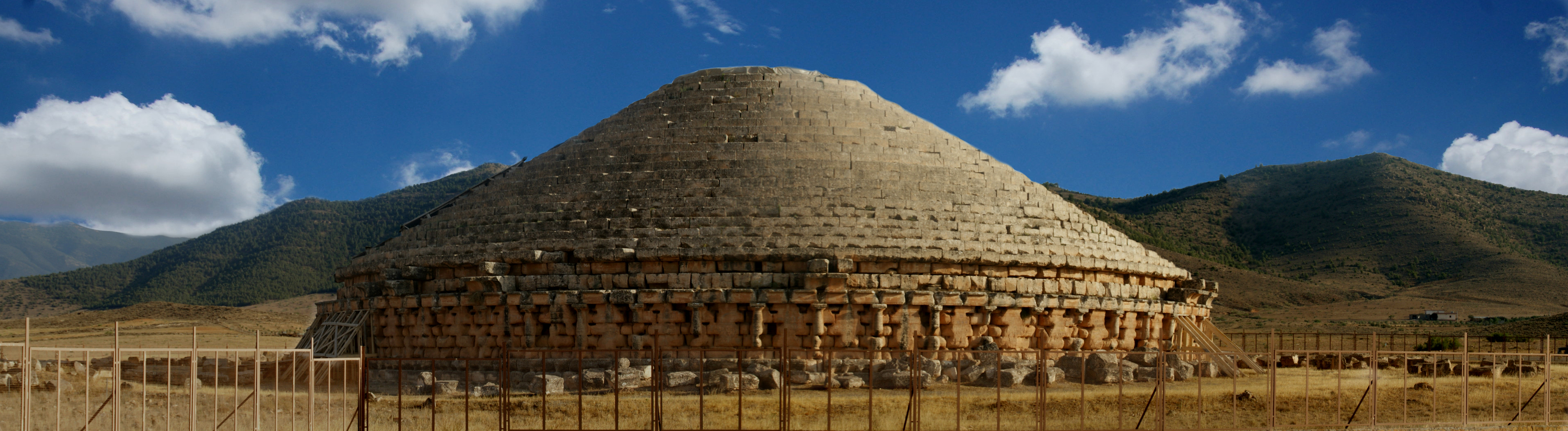
The mausoleum of Madghacen

The original religions of the peoples of the Maghreb seem to have been based in and related to fertility cults of a strong matriarchal pantheon. This theory is based on the social and linguistic structures of the Amazigh cultures that antedated all Egyptian and eastern Asian, northern Mediterranean, and European influences.

Historic records of religion in the Maghreb region show its gradual inclusion in the Classical World, with coastal colonies established first by Phoenicians, some Greeks, and later extensive conquest and colonization by the Romans. By the 2nd century of the common era, the area had become a center of Phoenician-speaking Christianity. Its bishops spoke and wrote in Punic, and Emperor Septimius Severus was noted by his local accent. Roman settlers and Romanized populations converted to Christianity. Carthage subsequently exercised informal primacy as an archdiocese, being the most important center of Christianity in the whole of Roman Africa, corresponding to most of today's Mediterranean coast and inland of Northern Africa. The region produced figures such as Christian church writer Tertullian (c. 155 – c. 202); and Christian martyrs or leading figures such as Perpetua, and Felicity (martyrs, c. 200 CE); St. Cyprian of Carthage (+ 258); St. Monica; her son the philosopher St. Augustine, Bishop of Hippo I (+ 430) (1); and St. Julia of Carthage (5th century). Donatist Christianity mainly spread among the indigenous Berber population, and from the late fifth and early sixth century, the region included several Christian Berber kingdoms.

=== Islam ===
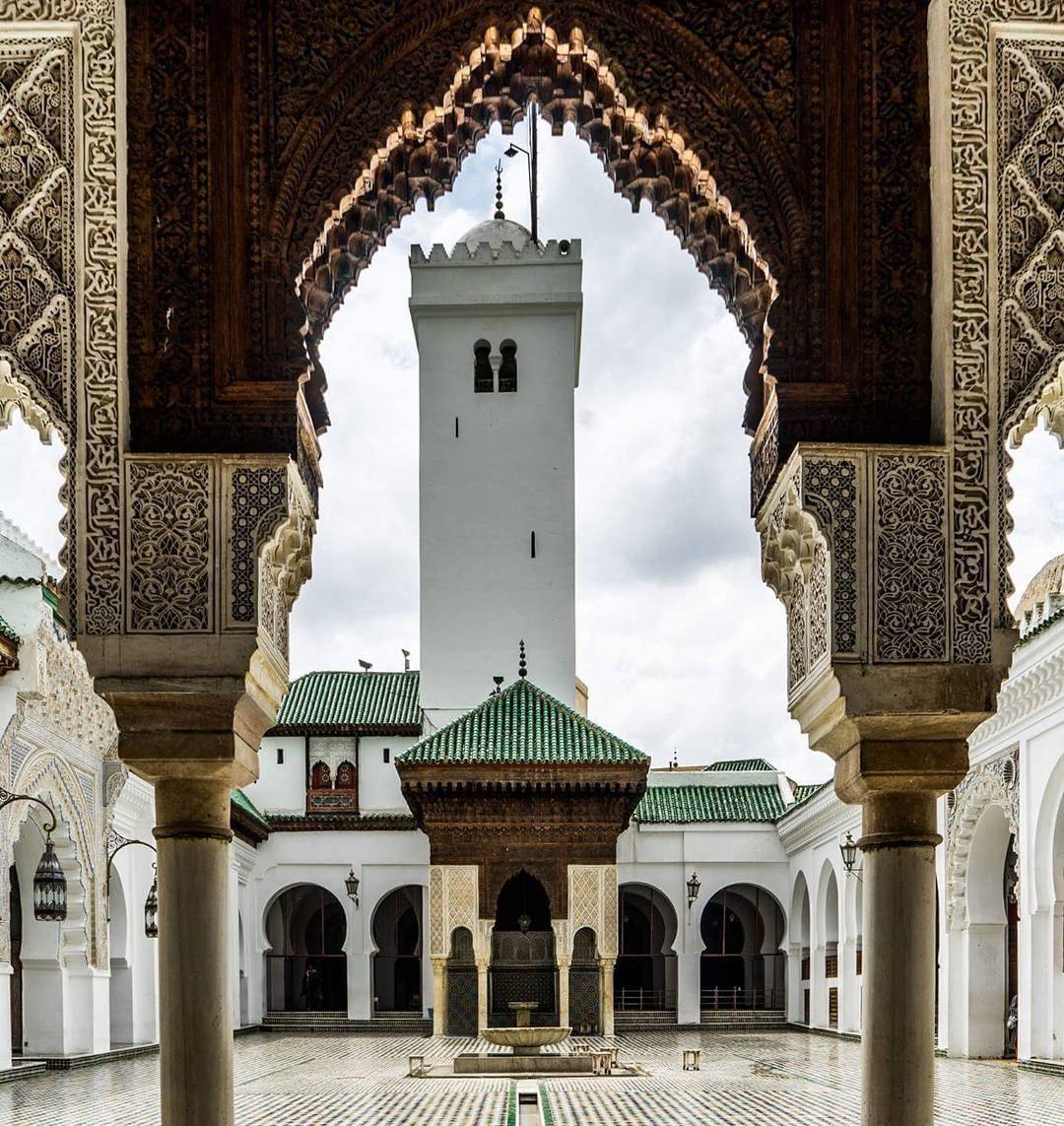
al-Qarawiyyin Mosque

Islam arrived in 647 and challenged the domination of Christianity. The first permanent foothold of Islam was the founding in 667 of the city of Kairouan, in present-day Tunisia. Carthage fell to Muslims in 698 and the remainder of the region fell by 709. Islamization proceeded slowly.

From the end of the 7th century, over a period of more than 400 years, the region's peoples converted to Islam. Many left during this time for Italy, although surviving letters showed correspondence from regional Christians to Rome up until the 12th century. Christianity was still a living faith. Although there were numerous conversions after the conquest, Muslims did not become a majority until some time late in the 9th century. During the 10th century, Islam became by far the dominant religion in the region. Christian bishoprics and dioceses continued to be active and continued their relations with the Christian Church of Rome. As late as the reign of Pope Benedict VII (974–983), a new Archbishop of Carthage was consecrated. From the 10th century, Christianity declined in the region. By the end of the 11th century, only two bishops were left in Carthage and Hippo Regius. Pope Gregory VII (1073–85) consecrated a new bishop for Hippo. Christianity seems to have suffered several shocks that led to its demise. First, many upper-class, urban-dwelling, Latin-speaking Christians left for Europe after the Muslim conquest of the Maghreb. The second major influence was the large-scale conversions to Islam from the end of the 9th century. Many Christians of a much reduced community departed in the mid-11th century, and remnants were evacuated in the 12th by the Norman rulers of Sicily. The Latin-African language lingered a while longer.

There was a small but thriving Jewish community, as well as a small Christian community. Most Muslims follow the Sunni Maliki school. Small Ibadi communities remain in some areas. A strong tradition of venerating marabouts and saints' tombs is found throughout regions inhabited by Berbers. This practice was also common among the Jews of the region. Any map of the region demonstrates the tradition by the proliferation of "Sidi"s, showing places named after the marabouts. This tradition has declined through the 20th century. A network of zaouias traditionally helped teach basic literacy and knowledge of Islam in rural regions.

=== Christianity ===
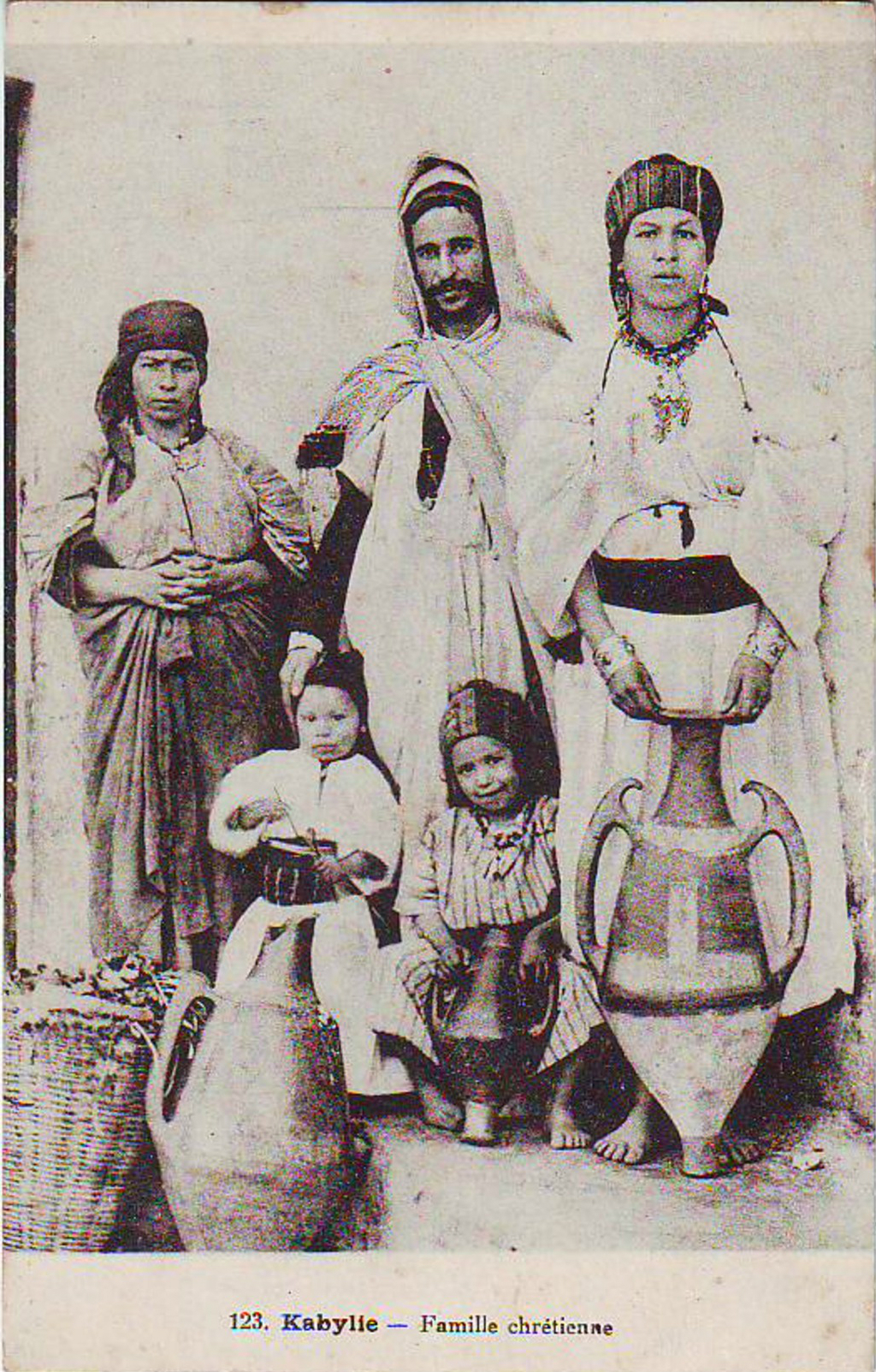
Christian Berber family from Kabylia

Communities of Christians, mostly Catholics and Protestant, persist in Algeria (100,000–380,000), Mauritania (10,000), Morocco (c. 380,000), Libya (170,000), and Tunisia (100,750). Most of the Roman Catholics in Greater Maghreb are of French, Spanish, and Italian descent, with ancestors who immigrated during the colonial era. Some are foreign missionaries or immigrant workers. There are also Christian communities of Berber or Arab descent in Greater Maghreb, made up of persons who converted mostly during the modern era, or under and after French colonialism.

Prior to independence, Algeria was home to 1.4 million pieds-noirs (ethnic French who were mostly Catholic), and Morocco was home to half a million Europeans, Tunisia was home to 255,000 Europeans, and Libya was home to 145,000 Europeans. In religion, most of the pieds-noirs in Maghreb are Catholic. Due to the exodus of the pieds-noirs in the 1960s, more North African Christians of Berber or Arab descent now live in France than in Greater Maghreb. Prior to independence, the European Catholic settlers had historic legacy and powerful presence in Maghreb countries.

Recently, the Protestant community of Berber or Arab descent has grown significantly as additional individuals convert to Christianity, especially to Evangelicalism. This has occurred in Algeria, especially in the Kabylie, Morocco, and in Tunisia. The Catholic population in Libya is estimated to number 100,000, The Catholics are the largest Christian denomination, followed by c. 60,000 Copts and a small number of Anglicans.

A 2015 study estimates 380,000 Muslims converted to Christianity in Algeria. The number of Moroccans who converted to Christianity (most of them secret worshipers) are estimated between 40,000–150,000. The International Religious Freedom Report for 2007 estimates thousands of Tunisian Muslims have converted to Christianity. A 2015 study estimate some 1,500 believers in Christ from a Muslim background living in Libya.

In 2019, the proportion of Melillans that identify themselves as Roman Catholic was 65.0%, the Roman Catholic churches in Melilla belong to the Diocese of Málaga. Roman Catholicism is the largest religion in Ceuta; in 2019, the proportion of Ceutans that identify themselves as Roman Catholic was 60.0%. The Roman Catholic churches in Ceuta belong to the Diocese of Cádiz y Ceuta.

=== Jewish presence ===
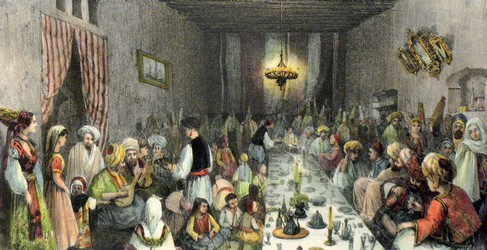
Jewish Feast in Algeria, 1835

The earliest documented Jewish presence in the Maghreb dates to the third century BCE, with Jews being settled in eastern Libya by the Ptolemaic rulers of Egypt. During the Roman Empire, Jewish communities expanded across the Maghreb, with archaeological evidence, including synagogues and inscriptions, indicating their presence in what are now Tunisia, Algeria, and Morocco from the early centuries CE. Under early Muslim rule, Jews flourished in major urban centers such as Kairouan, Fez, and Tunis, with the Jewish community in Kairouan particularly noted for its significant intellectual and cultural contributions. However, Jews also encountered periods of persecution, particularly under the Almohad Caliphate (12th–13th centuries), which imposed severe restrictions on non-Muslims. In the 14th to 16th centuries, the Maghreb experienced an influx of Jews fleeing from Spain and Portugal due to growing persecution and the Spanish Inquisition. Following the expulsion of Jews from Spain in 1492 and the forced mass conversions in Portugal in 1497, many Sephardic Jews settled in North Africa, establishing new communities and integrating with the existing Jewish populations.

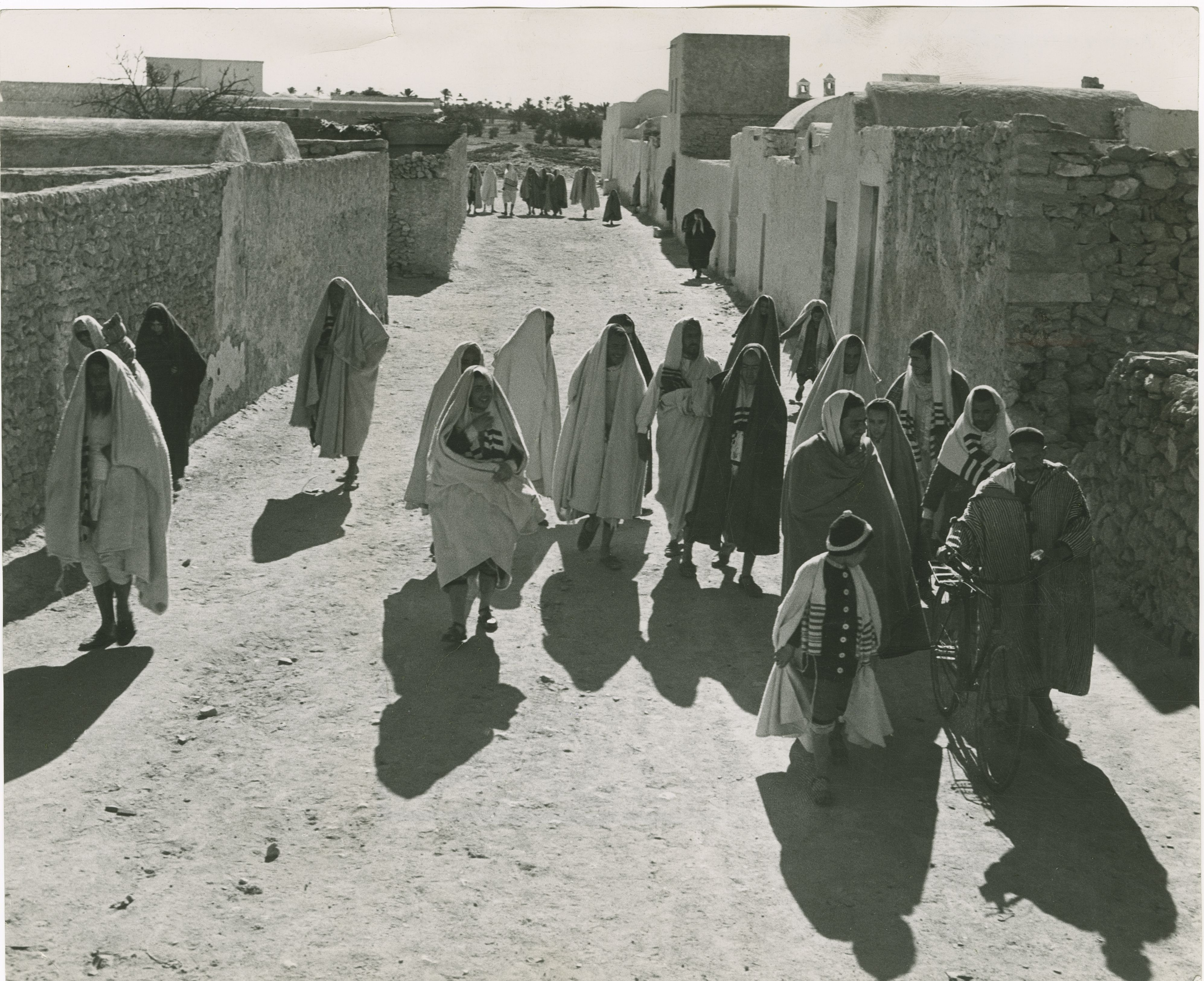
A group of Jews on a street in the Jewish village of Hara Seghira in Djerba, 1952

In the 10th century, as the social and political environment in Baghdad became increasingly hostile to Jews, some Jewish traders emigrated to the Maghreb, especially Kairouan, Tunisia. Over the following two or three centuries, such Jewish traders became known as the Maghribi, a distinctive social group who traveled throughout the Mediterranean world. They passed this identification on from father to son. Their tight-knit pan-Maghreb community had the ability to use social sanctions as a credible alternative to legal recourse, which was weak at the time anyway. This unique institutional alternative permitted the Maghribis to very successfully participate in the Mediterranean trade. This facilitated contacts between the Maghrebi and European Jewish communities, particularly in trade in the pre-colonial period. The most important points of contact were Livorno in Italy with its harbour frequented by Tunisian merchants and Marseille in France with its counterpart, the harbour for Algeria and Morocco. The Maghreb region produced spices and leather, from shoes to handbags. As many of the Maghrebi Jews were craftsmen and merchants, they had contact with their European customers. Today, among Arab countries, the largest Jewish community now exists in Morocco with about 2,000 Jews and in Tunisia with about 1,000.

== Culture ==
Cuscus

The countries of the Maghreb share many cultural similarities and traditions. Among these is a culinary tradition that Habib Bourguiba defined as Western Arab, where bread or couscous are the staple foods, as opposed to Eastern Arab, where bread, crushed wheat or white rice are the staple foods. In terms of food, some similarities beyond the starches are found throughout the Arab world.

Among other cultural and artistic traditions, jewellery of the Berber cultures worn by Amazigh women and made of silver, beads and other applications was a common trait of Berber identities in large areas of the Maghreb up to the second half of the 20th century.

In 2020, couscous was added to UNESCO's Intangible Cultural Heritage list.

== Economy ==
=== Maghreb countries by GDP (PPP) ===
List by the International Monetary Fund (2013)

Rank	Country	GDP (PPP) $M
44	Algeria	285,541
58	Morocco	179,240
70	Tunisia	108,430
81	Libya	70,386
148	Mauritania	8,241

List by the World Bank (2013)

Rank	Country	GDP (PPP) $M
34	Algeria	421,626
55	Morocco	241,757
70	Libya	132,695
75	Tunisia	120,755
143	Mauritania	11,835

List by The World Factbook (2013)

Rank	Country	GDP (PPP) $M
45	Algeria	284,700
58	Morocco	180,000
68	Tunisia	108,400
81	Libya	73,600
151	Mauritania	8,204

List by the International Monetary Fund (2019)

Rank	Country	GDP (PPP) $M
35	Algeria	681,396
54	Morocco	328,651
76	Tunisia	149,190
101	Libya	61,559
143	Mauritania	19,811

List by the World Bank (2017)

Rank	Country	GDP (PPP) $M
35	Algeria	631,150
55	Morocco	298,230
76	Tunisia	137,358
78	Libya	125,142
143	Mauritania	17,458

List by The World Factbook (2017)

Rank	Country	GDP (PPP) $M
35	Algeria	629,300
55	Morocco	300,100
76	Tunisia	135,900
102	Libya	63,140
148	Mauritania	17,370

== See also ==
- Tamazgha
- Maghrebi Arabs
- Maghrebi script
- North Africa
