= List of ecoregions in Western Sahara =

The following is a list of ecoregions in Western Sahara, according to the Worldwide Fund for Nature (WWF).

== Terrestrial ecoregions ==
=== Palearctic ===
==== Mediterranean forests, woodlands, and scrub ====
- Mediterranean acacia-argania dry woodlands and succulent thickets

==== Deserts and xeric shrublands ====
- Atlantic coastal desert
- North Saharan steppe and woodlands

== Freshwater ecoregions ==
- Dry Sahel
- Permanent Maghreb
- Temporary Maghreb

== Marine ecoregions ==
- Saharan Upwelling
