= Mediterranean woodlands and forests =

Ecoregion in Northern Africa

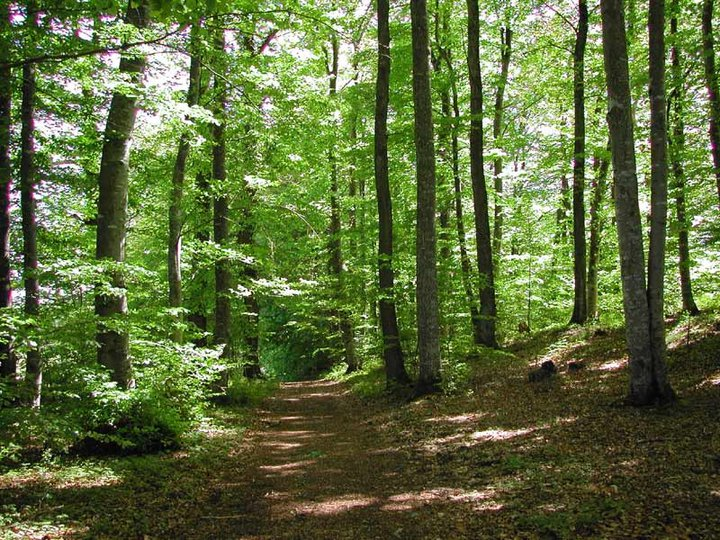
- Gammarth Forest near Tunis

- Map of the Mediterranean woodlands and forests

Ecology
- Realm: Palearctic
- Biome: Mediterranean forests, woodlands, and scrub
- Borders: List: Mediterranean Acacia-Argania dry woodlands; Mediterranean conifer and mixed forests; Mediterranean dry woodlands and steppe; Mediterranean High Atlas juniper steppe; North Saharan steppe and woodlands; Saharan halophytics

Geography
- Area: 356,366 km^{2} (137,594 mi^{2})
- Countries: List: Algeria; Libya; Morocco; Tunisia; Spain (plazas de soberanía)

Conservation
- Conservation status: critical/endangered
- Protected: 28,451 km^{2} (8%)

The Mediterranean woodlands and forests is an ecoregion in the coastal plains, hills, and mountains bordering the Mediterranean Sea and Atlantic Ocean in North Africa. It has a Mediterranean climate, and is in the Mediterranean forests, woodlands, and scrub biome.

== Geography ==
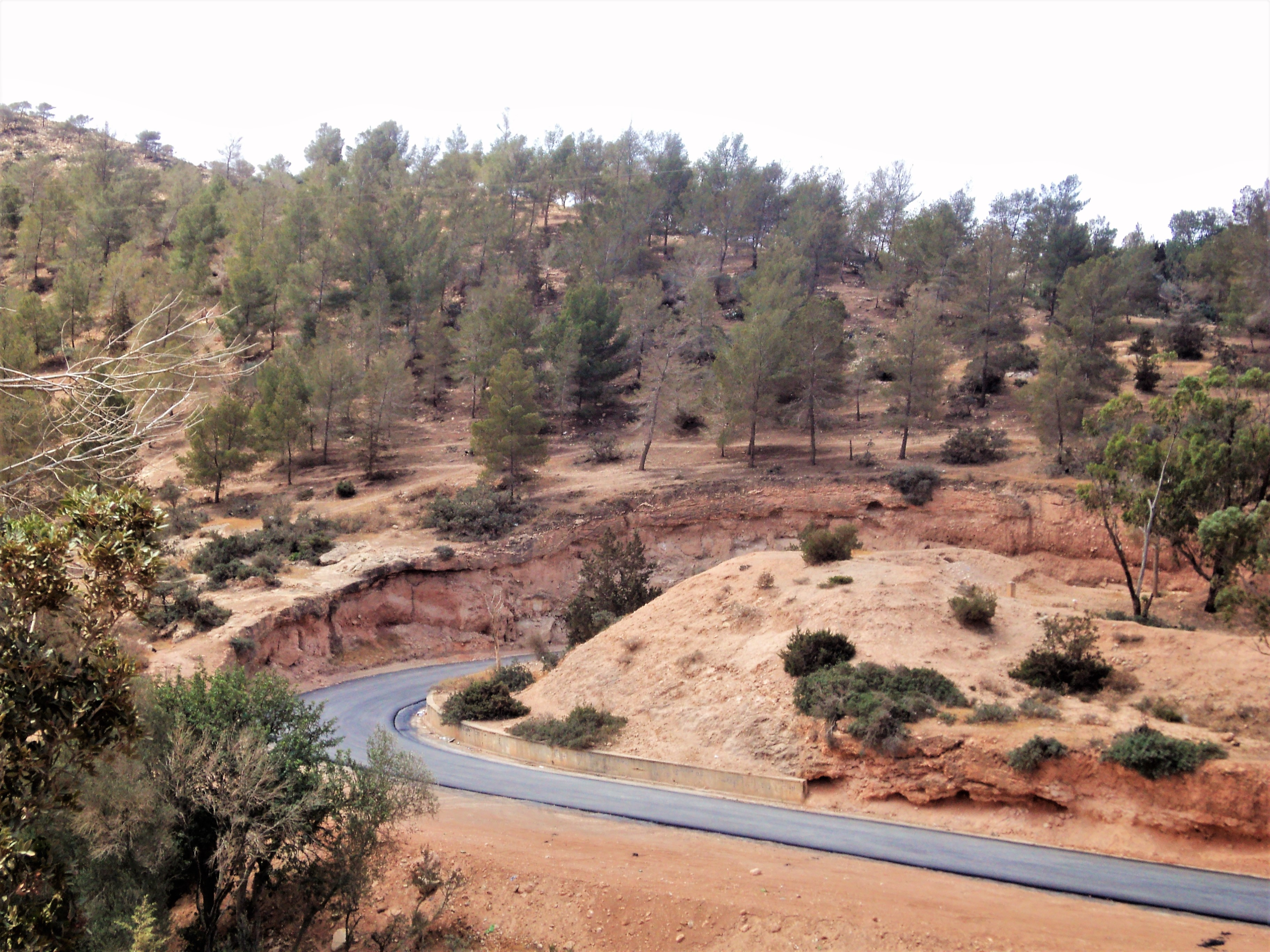
Al Bakour escarpment, Jebel Akhdar, Libya.

The Mediterranean woodlands and forests occupy an area of 357,900 square kilometers (138,200 sq mi) in Morocco, Algeria, Tunisia, the Spanish plazas de soberanía, and Libya. The main portion of the ecoregion extends along the coastal plains and hills of the Maghreb, from near Agadir on the Atlantic coast of Morocco in the west to Sfax on the Gulf of Gabes in Tunisia. The ecoregion extends inland to cover the lower slopes of the Middle Atlas and High Atlas ranges of Morocco, with isolated enclaves along the Saharan Atlas range of Algeria.

Two coastal enclaves lie further east along the Mediterranean Sea: one along the southeastern Tunisian shore of the Gulf of Gabes, including the island of Djerba; and the second in the Jebel Akhdar mountains along the shore of the Cyrenaica Peninsula in northeastern Libya.

The Mediterranean woodlands and forests are bounded on the south by the drier Mediterranean dry woodlands and steppe, which occupies the plateaus and mountain ranges bordering the Sahara; and on the north by the Alboran Sea which is the westernmost part of the Mediterranean Sea. The Mediterranean acacia-argania dry woodlands and succulent thickets, which occupy the coastal plain of southern Morocco, bounds the Mediterranean woodlands and forests on the southwest.

The Mediterranean forests and woodlands surround the Mediterranean conifer and mixed forests ecoregion, which exists as a series of enclaves in the coastal Rif Mountains and interior Middle Atlas and High Atlas Morocco, the coastal Tell Atlas and eastern Saharan Atlas of Algeria, and the Kroumerie and Mogod ranges of Tunisia. The Mediterranean High Atlas juniper steppe ecoregion occupies the highest elevations of the High Atlas.

== Flora ==
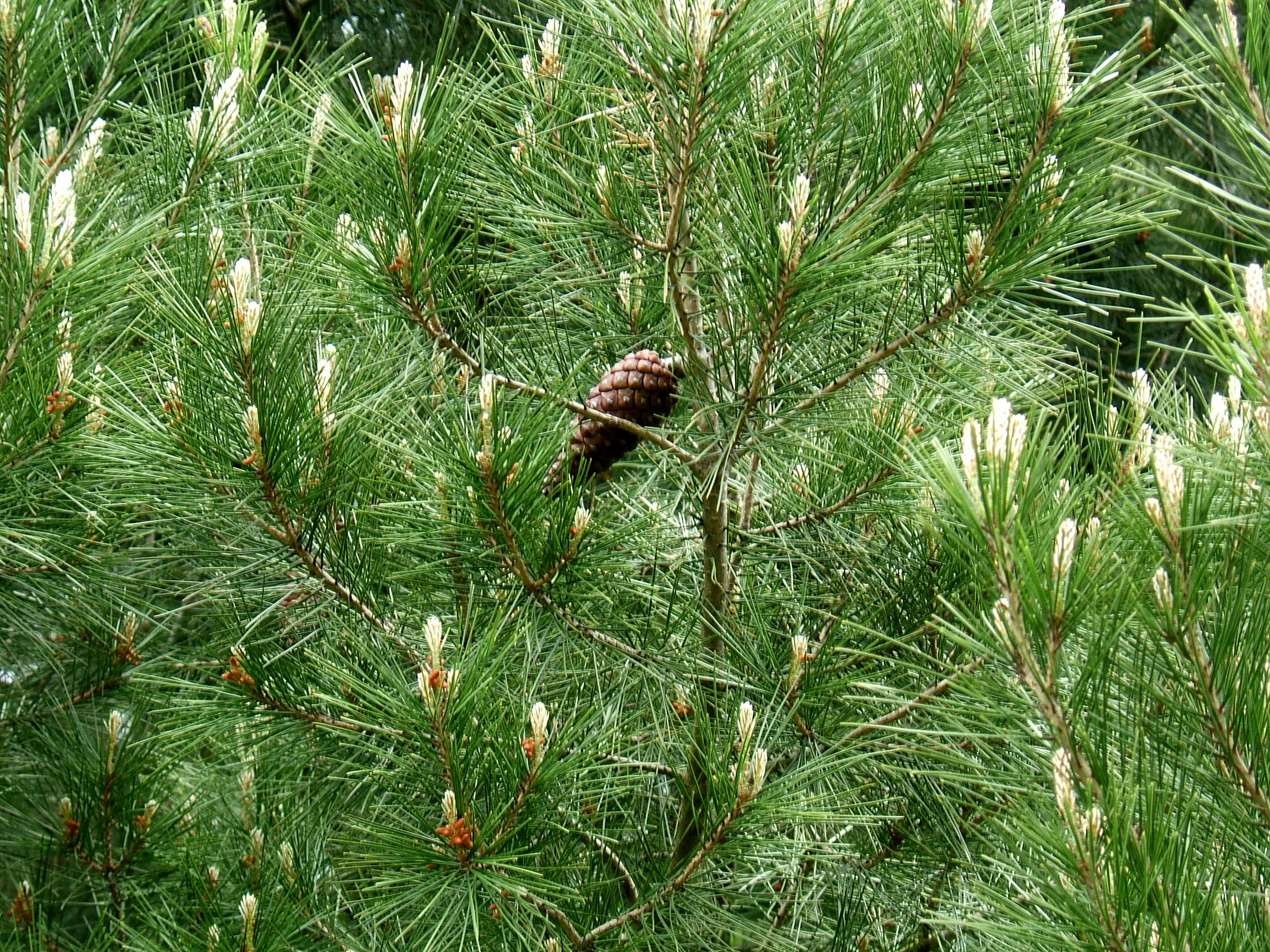
Foliage and cone of the Aleppo pine (Pinus halepensis).

The natural vegetation consists of forests, woodlands, and shrublands. The five chief plant communities are:

- Xeric pine forests and woodlands: The xeric pine forests are found mainly in the drier interior, near the transition to the Mediterranean dry woodlands and steppe, where rainfall averages 300 to 600 mm per year. The predominant tree is Aleppo pine (Pinus halepensis). It is often found in mixed stands with evergreen holm oak (Quercus rotundifolia), maritime pine (Pinus pinaster) and xeric junipers (Juniperus phoenicea and Juniperus oxycedrus). The forests and woodlands have an understory of shrubs, including Cistus, Genista, and rosemary, which also form pockets of shrubland.
- Berber thuya forests and woodlands: These forests and woodlands are found in the milder lowlands of northern Morocco, western coastal Algeria, and pockets in the coastal mountains in northwestern Tunisia, typically on soils derived from limestone. They are characterized by Berber thuya (Tetraclinis articulata), a conifer that can form coppice woodlands. The understory is chiefly of shrubs.
- Cork oak woodlands: are found in low and medium elevations with mild winters and relatively high rainfall (600 to 800 mm), often on soils formed over siliceous rocks. Cork oak (Quercus suber) forests are found on the coastal plains between Casablanca and the Rif Mountains in northern Morocco, and several areas further inland around the Rif and Middle Atlas ranges. They also found on along the Tell Atlas of northern Algeria, and in the Kroumerie and Mogod mountain ranges of northwestern Tunisia.
  Cork oak (Quercus suber) is the predominant tree, accompanied by a rich mix of evergreen small trees and large shrubs, including bay laurel (Laurus nobilis), strawberry tree (Arbutus unedo), tree heath (Erica arborea), green heath (Erica scoparia), holly (Ilex aquifolium), mock privet (Phillyrea angustifolia, P. latifolia), Mediterranean dwarf palm (Chamaerops humilis), laurustinus (Viburnum tinus), hairy broom (Cytisus villosus), Olea europaea, Balanites aegyptiaca, Cupressus sempervirens, Vachellia tortilis, Quercus coccifera, Quercus rotundifolia, Pistacia terebinthus, Pinus nigra, Pinus pinaster, Pinus pinea, Pinus halepensis, Ceratonia siliqua, Arbutus unedo, Aerva javanica, and common myrtle (Myrtus communis).

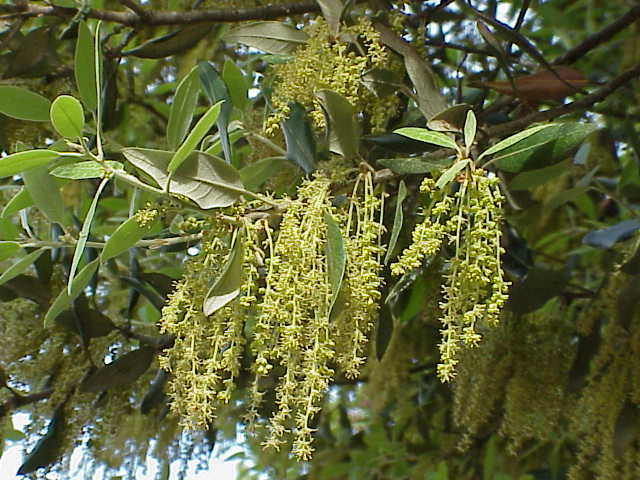
Holm oak (Quercus ilex) trees occur in the Mediterranean woodlands and forests ecoregion

- Holm oak and kermes oak forests and woodlands: forests, woodlands, and shrublands of holm oak (Quercus rotundifolia) and kermes oak (Quercus coccifera) are the most widespread plant community, found from the coast to the mountains on a variety of climates and soils. Holm oak forests formerly found in lowland areas with deep and humid soils have mostly been displaced by agriculture.
- Wild olive and carob woodlands and maquis: open woodlands of wild olive (Olea europaea europaea and Olea europaea maroccana), and carob (Ceratonia siliqua) once covered lowland areas with deep, drier soils, but these areas have mostly been converted to agriculture. The remaining wild olive and carob woodlands have been transformed by fire, grazing, and firewood collection into maquis shrublands. Wild olives have also been displaced by cultivated varieties to produce olive oil, and carob is harvested for fodder.

Arbutus pavarii is endemic to the Jebel Akhdar in Cyrenaica.

== Fauna ==
The Mediterranean woodlands and forests were once home to several large mammals. Most now have a limited range, and a few are extinct. The Barbary stag (Cervus elaphus barbarus) is limited to portions of its former range in Morocco, Algeria, and Tunisia. Native carnivores include the striped hyena (Hyaena hyaena) red fox (Vulpes vulpes), common jackal (Canis aureus), caracal (Felis caracal), common genet (Genetta genetta), and Egyptian mongoose (Herpestes ichneumon). Smaller mammals include the North African hedgehog (Atelerix algirus), North African elephant shrew (Elephantulus rozeti), Barbary ground squirrel (Atlantoxerus getulus), and North African gerbil (Dipodillus campestris). The Egyptian wolf (Canis anthus lupaster), Barbary leopard (Panthera pardus pardus), and Barbary macaque (Macaca sylvanus) are endangered, and their range is now limited to small areas. The Atlas bear (Ursus arctos crowtheri) and Barbary lion (Panthera leo leo) are extinct.

The ecoregion has 120 native bird species. They include the raptors golden eagle (Aquila chrysaetos), black-winged kite (Elanus caeruleus), short-toed snake eagle (Circaetus gallicus), booted eagle (Hieratus pennatus), and lesser kestrel (Falco naumanni). Subspecies of the great spotted woodpecker (Dendrocopos major numidus) and grey shrike (Lanus meridionalis algeriensis) are endemic to the ecoregion and the adjacent Mediterranean conifer and mixed forests.

== History, conservation, and current threats ==
This ecoregion is densely settled, and much transformed by agriculture, grazing, fire, and timber cutting and firewood gathering. It is home to several large cities, including Casablanca, Rabat, Tangier, and Fez in Morocco, Algiers and Oran in Algeria, Tunis in Tunisia, and Benghazi in Libya.

== Protected areas ==
A 2017 assessment found that 28,451 km^{2}, or 8%, of the ecoregion is in protected areas. Protected areas include Al Hoceima National Park and Tazekka National Park in Morocco, Chrea National Park, El Kala National Park, Gouraya National Park, and Tlemcen National Park in Algeria, and Bou-Hedma National Park, Chambi National Park, Jebel Chitana-Cap Négro National Park, Jebel Mghilla National Park, Jebel Serj National Park, and Jebel Zaghdoud National Park in Tunisia.
