= Atlantic coastal desert =

Desert ecoregion in northwestern Africa

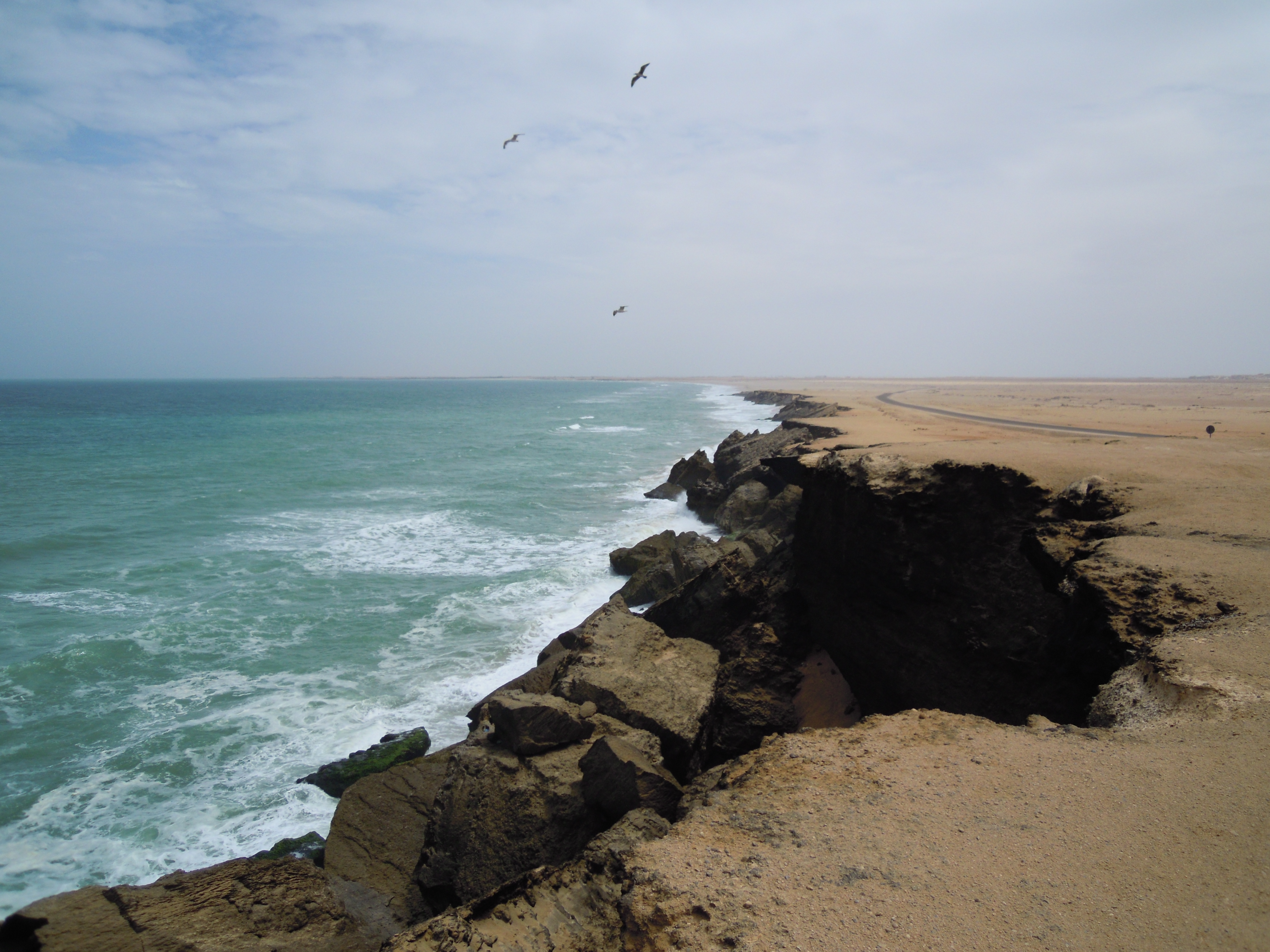
- The desert in Dakhla, Western Sahara

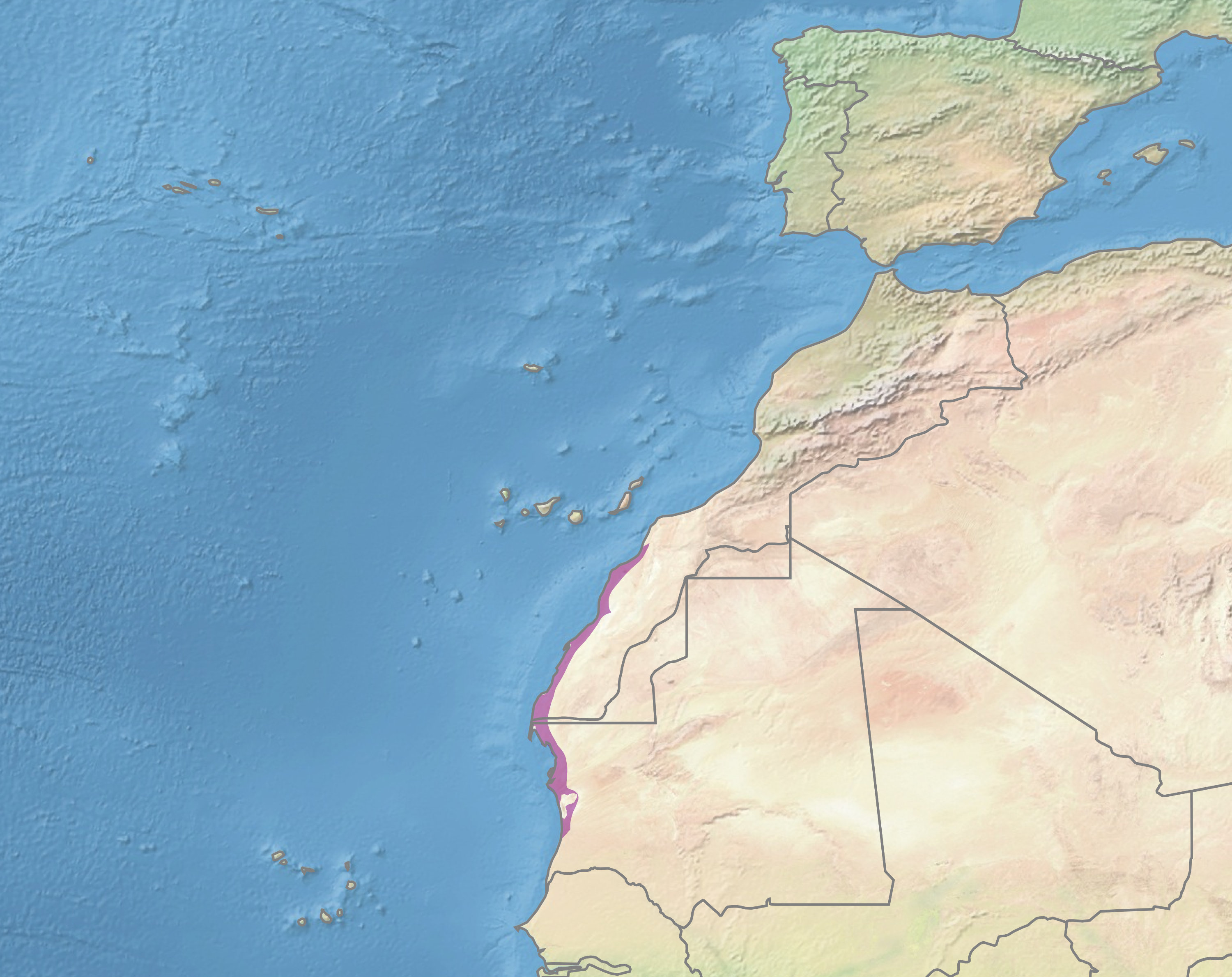
- Location of the Atlantic coastal desert (in purple)

Ecology
- Realm: Palearctic
- Biome: Deserts and xeric shrublands
- Borders: Mediterranean Acacia-Argania dry woodlands; North Saharan steppe and woodlands; Saharan halophytics, Sahelian Acacia savanna

Geography
- Area: 39,137 km^{2} (15,111 sq mi)
- Countries: Mauritania; Western Sahara

Conservation
- Conservation status: Relatively stable/intact
- Protected: 6,872 km^{2} (18%)

The Atlantic coastal desert is the westernmost ecoregion in the Sahara Desert of North Africa. It occupies a narrow strip along the Atlantic coast, where the more frequent fog and haze generated offshore by the cool Canary Current provides sufficient moisture to sustain a variety of lichens, succulents, and shrubs.

== Geography ==
It covers 39,900 square kilometers (15,400 sq mi) in Western Sahara and Mauritania. It is bounded on the west by the Atlantic Ocean, on the east by the North Saharan steppe and woodlands, on the north by the Mediterranean Acacia–Argania dry woodlands, and on the south by the Sahelian Acacia savanna.

== Climate ==
The cool ocean current gives an even higher atmospheric stability in the desert, by cooling air at the base. This increase in atmospheric stability serves to further reduce the amount of rainfall. Therefore, the climate is extremely dry with some 30 mm of annual precipitation in Dakhla, Western Sahara and 40 mm of annual precipitation in Nouadhibou, Mauritania. Several years may pass without any rainfall at all. The climate is very sunny year-round with around 3,200 hours of annual bright sunshine, though far less sunny than in other parts of the desert of North Africa due to fog and haze. Air in the Atlantic coastal desert is rather moist and the relative humidity is generally over 60% while farther in the interior, it quickly lowers to 30% or less. Temperatures are also much more moderated in this coastal desert and are relatively warm to truly hot in all seasons. Averages daily temperature is 20 °C (68 °F) in Dakhla. Maximum average high temperatures are 27 °C (80.6 °F) while minimum average low temperatures are 13 °C (55.4 °F) in Dakhla.

== Ecology ==
This bioregion is fairly rich in endemic plants but has no endemic fauna. The flora consists of a variety of lichens, succulents and drought-resistant shrubs. The Mediterranean monk seal (Monachus monachus) is found here and the broad bays are important overwintering grounds for large numbers of Palearctic wading birds. Greater flamingoes (Phoenicopterus roseus) and many other waterbirds congregate on the wetlands during their migrations. Mammals found here include the Dorcas gazelle (Gazella dorcas), golden wolf (Canis lupusater), fennec fox (Fennecus zerda), Rüppell's fox (Vulpes rueppelli), sand cat (Felis margarita), honey badger (Mellivora capensis) and striped hyena (Hyaena hyaena).
