= Mediterranean Acacia–Argania dry woodlands =

Mediterranean Acacia-Argania dry woodlands and succulent thickets
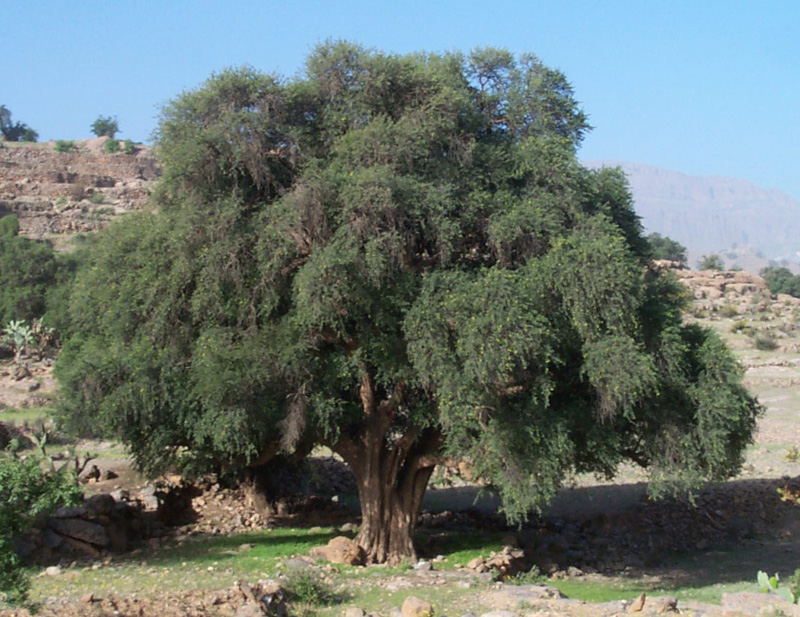
- Argan tree, which is dominant in these woodlands

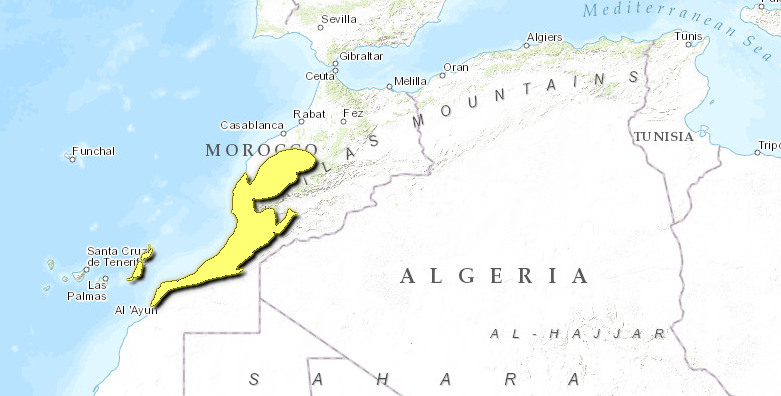
- location of the ecoregion

Ecology
- Realm: Palearctic
- Biome: Mediterranean forests, woodlands, and scrub
- Borders: Mediterranean woodlands and forests; North Saharan steppe and woodlands; Atlantic coastal desert

Geography
- Area: 99,619 km^{2} (38,463 sq mi)
- Countries: Morocco; Western Sahara; Spain
- Autonomous community of Spain: Canary Islands

Conservation
- Conservation status: Critical/endangered
- Protected: 17,725 km^{2} (18%)

The Mediterranean Acacia–Argania dry woodlands and succulent thickets is a Mediterranean forests, woodlands, and scrub ecoregion in North Africa centered mainly on Morocco but also including northwestern Western Sahara and the eastern Canary Islands.

== Geography ==
This ecoregion occupies 1,000,000 km^{2} (390,000 sq mi) in Morocco, northwestern Western Sahara, and the eastern Canary Islands (Lanzarote, Fuerteventura, and associated islets). On the African mainland, it encompasses the Atlantic coastal plain, the lowlands of Al Haouz Province, the valleys of the Sous River and Draa River, and the westernmost part of the High Atlas and Anti-Atlas Mountains.

It has either a Mediterranean climate or a semi-arid climate or even an arid climate given that mean annual rainfall is below 500 millimetres (20 in) and falls as low as 50 millimetres (2.0 in) in the driest areas of the ecoregion. The winters are mild and frost-free and the summers relatively cool because of the moderating influence of the ocean. Temperatures average 18 to 20 °C (64 to 68 °F).

The Mediterranean Acacia-Argania dry woodlands and succulent thickets ecoregion is bounded on the north by the Mediterranean woodlands and forests, on the east by the North Saharan steppe and woodlands, on the south by the Atlantic coastal desert, and on the west by the Atlantic Ocean.

== Flora ==
The chief plant communities in the ecoregion are dominated by Argania spinosa accompanied by Acacias, and the predominant lower vegetation is succulent shrubland dominated by Euphorbias. Some of the associated plant species are Periploca laevigata, Senecio anthephorbium, Launaea arborescens, Warionia saharae, Acacia gummifera, Rhus trpartitum, Withania frutescens, Euphorbia officinarum, Cytisus albidus, Ephedra altissima and Tetraclinis articulata.

There are a number of plants endemic to the Canary Islands portion of the ecoregion.

== Fauna ==
Mammals found on the mainland portion of the ecoregion include the honey badger, European wildcat, Egyptian mongoose, Barbary ground squirrel, North African elephant shrew, Hoogstraal's gerbil, Barbary striped grass mouse and wild boar. Other, rarer mammals include caracal, African wildcat, dorcas gazelle, Cuvier's gazelle and Barbary sheep. The Canarian shrew (Crocidura canariensis) is endemic to Fuerteventura, Lanzarote, and neighboring islets.

== Protected areas ==
A 2017 assessment found that 17,725 km^{2}, or 18%, of the ecoregion is in protected areas. Protected areas in Morocco include Arganeraie Biosphere Reserve (23690 km^{2}, Souss-Massa National Park), Khenifiss National Park (1668.16 km^{2}), Oued Chbeyka Hunting Reserve (1329.78 km^{2}), and Rouisset Tayssa Boulafraij Ouinskour et Oued Daraa Hunting Reserve (3177.54 km^{2}).

Protected areas in the eastern Canary Islands include Timanfaya National Park (51.81 km^{2}), Chinijo Archipelago Natural Park (460.16 km^{2}), and Los Volcanes Natural Park (99.95 km^{2}) on Lanzarote, and Jandia Natural Park (149.83 km^{2}) and Corralejo Natural Park (26.89 km^{2}) on Fuerteventura.
