= North Saharan steppe and woodlands =

Ecoregion in North Africa

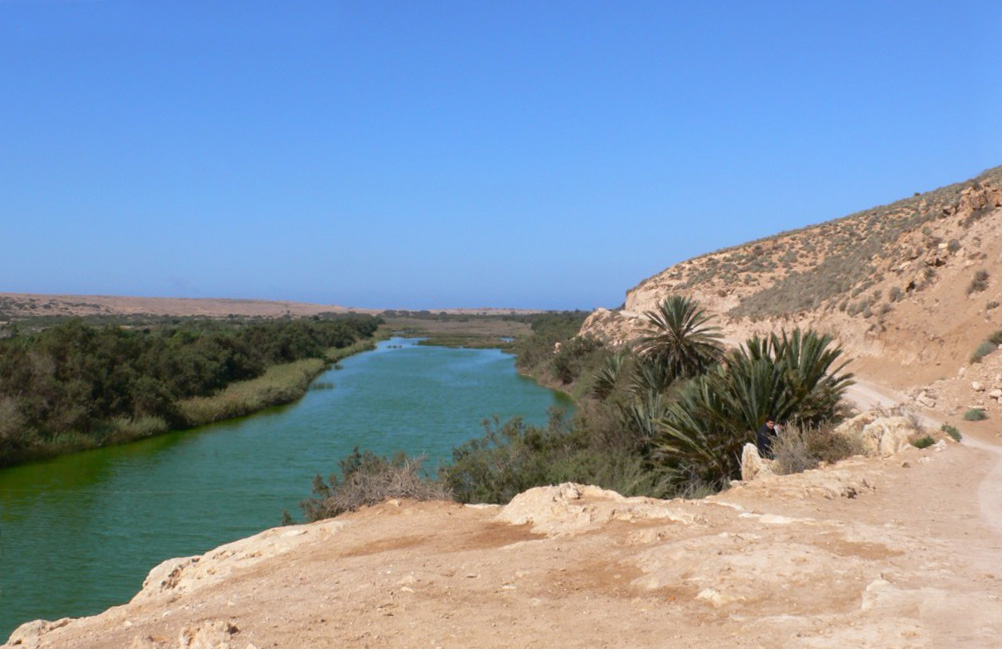
- Souss-Massa National Park in Morocco

- Map of North Africa with ecoregion territory in purple

Ecology
- Realm: Palearctic
- Biome: Deserts and xeric shrublands
- Borders: List: Arabian Desert and East Sahero-Arabian xeric shrublands; Atlantic coastal desert; Mediterranean dry woodlands and steppe; Nile Delta flooded savanna; Sahara Desert; Saharan halophytics; Sahelian Acacia savanna; South Saharan steppe and woodlands; West Saharan montane xeric woodlands

Geography
- Area: 1,675,300 km^{2} (646,800 mi^{2})
- Countries: List: Algeria; Egypt; Libya; Mauritania; Morocco; Tunisia; Western Sahara

Conservation
- Conservation status: relatively intact
- Protected: 0.69%

The North Saharan steppe and woodlands is a desert ecoregion, in the deserts and xeric shrublands biome, that forms the northern edge of the Sahara. It extends east and west across Northern Africa, south of the Mediterranean dry woodlands and steppe ecoregion of the Maghreb and Cyrenaica, which is part of the Mediterranean forests, woodlands, and scrub biome. Winter rains sustain shrublands and dry woodlands that form an ecotone between the Mediterranean climate regions to the north and the hyper-arid Sahara Desert ecoregion to the south.

== Geography ==
The North Saharan steppe and woodlands covers 1,675,300 square kilometers (646,800 sq mi) in Algeria, Egypt, Libya, Mauritania, Morocco, Tunisia, and Western Sahara.

== Climate ==
The climate in this ecoregion is hot and dry in the summer but cooler with some rain in the winter. Atlantic depressions sometimes penetrate inland between October and April. Rainfall is erratic, but averages 100 mm (4 in) in the north and 50 mm (2 in) in the south. During the summer, temperatures regularly rise to 40 to 45 °C (104 to 113 °F) and evaporation far exceeds precipitation.

== Ecology ==
There are varying habitats in the ecoregion including sandy systems, rocky plateaus, wadis, depressions and mountains. Each has its own characteristic species and there is considerable endemism of both plants and animals in the area.

== Flora ==
Plant communities include steppes of grasses, herbs and low shrubs, tall shrublands, and dry woodlands. Shrublands and woodlands typically grow in depressions, in the valleys of intermittent streams (wadis), and on consolidated dunes. Common trees include Vachellia tortilis, Pistacia atlantica, and Tamarix aphylla. Tall shrubs of the woodlands and tall shrublands include Retama raetam, Ziziphus lotus, Calobota saharae, and Calligonum comosum.

Plants have evolved various strategies to adapt to the dry climate and intermittent rainfall. Many herbaceous ephemeral plants, particularly in the north, germinate in January during the wet season and quickly mature and flower before they dry out in the spring.

== Fauna ==
Small mammals endemic to the Sahara area include the four-toed jerboa (Allactaga tetradactyla), North African gerbil (Gerbillus campestris), James's gerbil (G. jamesi), pale gerbil (G. perpallidus), lesser short-tailed gerbil (G. simoni), sand gerbil (G. syrticus), fat-tailed gerbil (Pachyuromys duprasi) and Shaw's jird (Meriones shawi). Larger mammals include the dorcas gazelle (Gazella dorcas), mountain gazelle (Gazella cuvieri) and slender-horned gazelle (Gazella leptoceros). There are a variety of snakes and lizards, including two endemic species, desert agama (Trapelus mutabilis) and Natterer's gecko (Tropiocolotes nattereri). There are few amphibians, Brongersma's toad (Bufo brongersmai) being endemic to the coastal region of North Africa. Among the bird species, the Houbara bustard (Chlamydotis undulata) and Nubian bustard (Neotis nuba) have decreased in numbers because of hunting pressure.

== Protected areas ==
Only 0.69% of the ecoregion is in protected areas. These include:

- Dghoumes National Park, Tunisia
- El Omayed Nature Conservation Reserve, Egypt
- Iriqui National Park, Morocco
- Khnifiss National Park, Morocco
- Jbil National Park, Tunisia
- Oued Dkouk Nature Reserve, Tunisia
- Sanghr Jabbess National Park, Tunisia
- Sidi Toui National Park, Tunisia
