= Saharan halophytics =

Ecoregion in North Africa

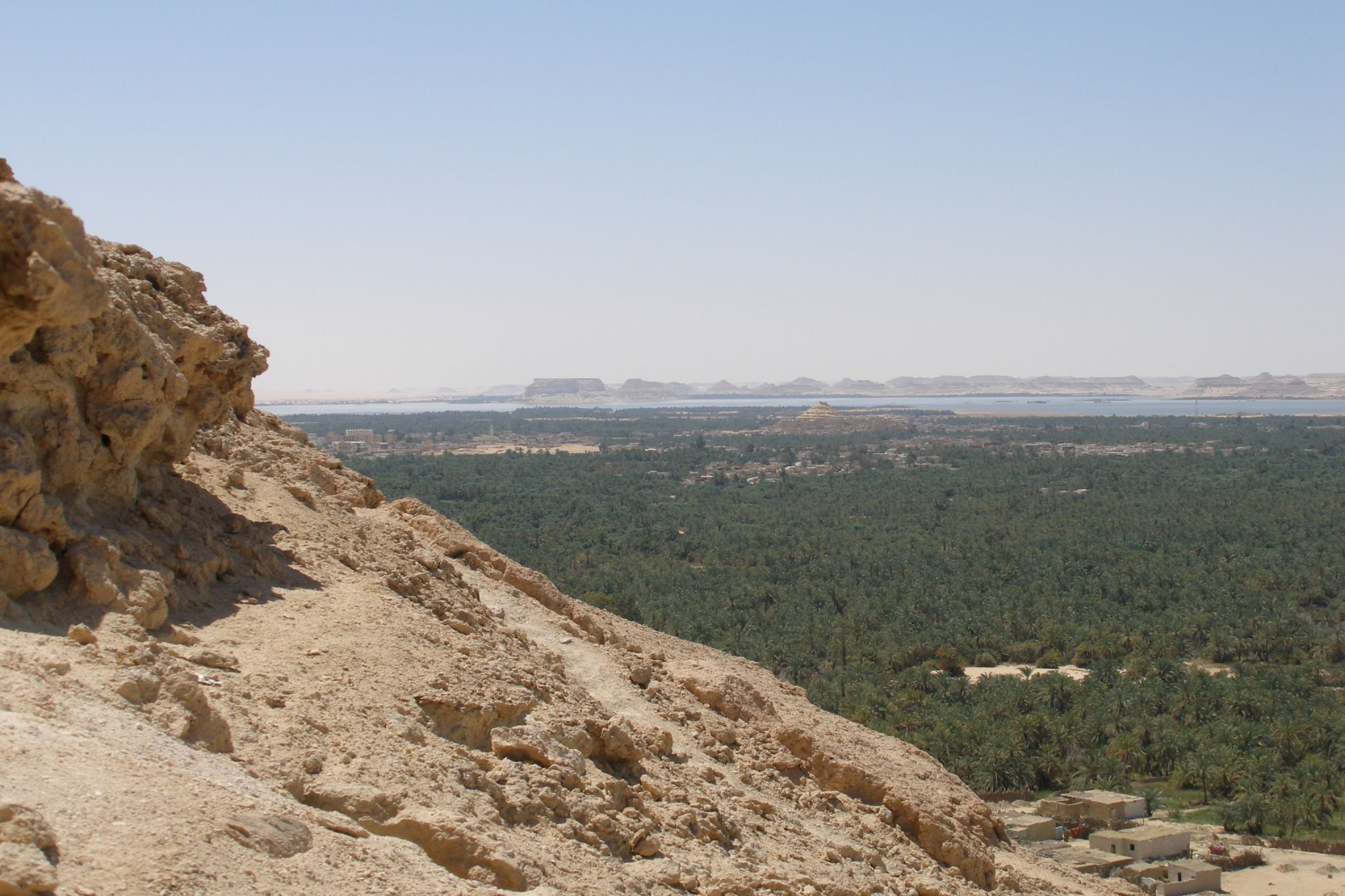
- Siwa Oasis, Egypt

- Ecoregion territory (in purple)

Ecology
- Realm: Palearctic
- Biome: Flooded grasslands and savannas

Geography
- Area: 54,031 km^{2} (20,861 sq mi)
- Country: Mauritania, Algeria, Tunisia, Libya, Egypt
- Coordinates: 29.25°S 25.75°E

The Saharan halophytics ecoregion (WWF ID: PA0905) covers a series of low-lying evaporite depressions and wetlands spread across North Africa. The depressions are characteristically saline, variously chotts (saline lakes fed by groundwater and some winter rains) or sabkhas (coastal, supratidal mudflats of evaporites). The plants of the areas are highly specialized to survive in the harsh environment, with many being xerophytes (drought-tolerant) and halophytes (salt-tolerant). The biodiversity of the areas has been relatively protected by their isolation, and unsuitability of alkaline soil for farming.

== Location and description ==
The sites making up this ecoregion contain a wide variety of habitat types: salt pans, seasonal salt lakes, salt marshes, reed beds, and spring-fed oases. Chott and sebkha areas exist in arid regions with clay soils heavy with evaporites. Specific locations assigned to this ecoregion include:

- Chott Melrhir (Northeast Algeria). An extension of the Gulf of Gabès into the Sahara. At 35 metres (115 ft) below sea level, it is one of the lowest points in the Sahara region.
- Chott el Hodna (Northeast Algeria). A saline, endoheric lake fed by runoff from the Tell Atlas Mountains in northeast Algeria. It has high steppe vegetation, being at an altitude of 400 metres (1,300 ft) between mountain ranges.
- Chott el Djerid (Southern Tunisia). Translates in English as "Lagoon of the Land of Palms".
- Qattara Depression (Northern Egypt). Salt marshes, salt pans and dry lake beds in a depression 133 metres (436 ft) below sea level, and 19,605 square kilometres (7,570 sq mi) in area. It includes the Moghra Oasis.
- Siwa Oasis (Northwestern Egypt). The "Field of Trees", Siwa is an 80 by 20 kilometres (50 mi × 12 mi) oasis fed by permanent springs. It supports agriculture—over 250,000 date palms and 30,000 olive trees by the 1980s.

The site are surrounded by terrain of the North Saharan steppe and woodlands ecoregion that extends across the northern Sahara.

== Climate ==
The climate of the ecoregion is Hot desert climate (Köppen climate classification (BWh)). This climate features stable air and high pressure aloft, producing a hot, arid desert. Hot-month temperatures typically average 29–35 °C (84–95 °F). Rainfall varies between 10–100 millimetres (0.39–3.94 in) per year.

== Flora and fauna ==
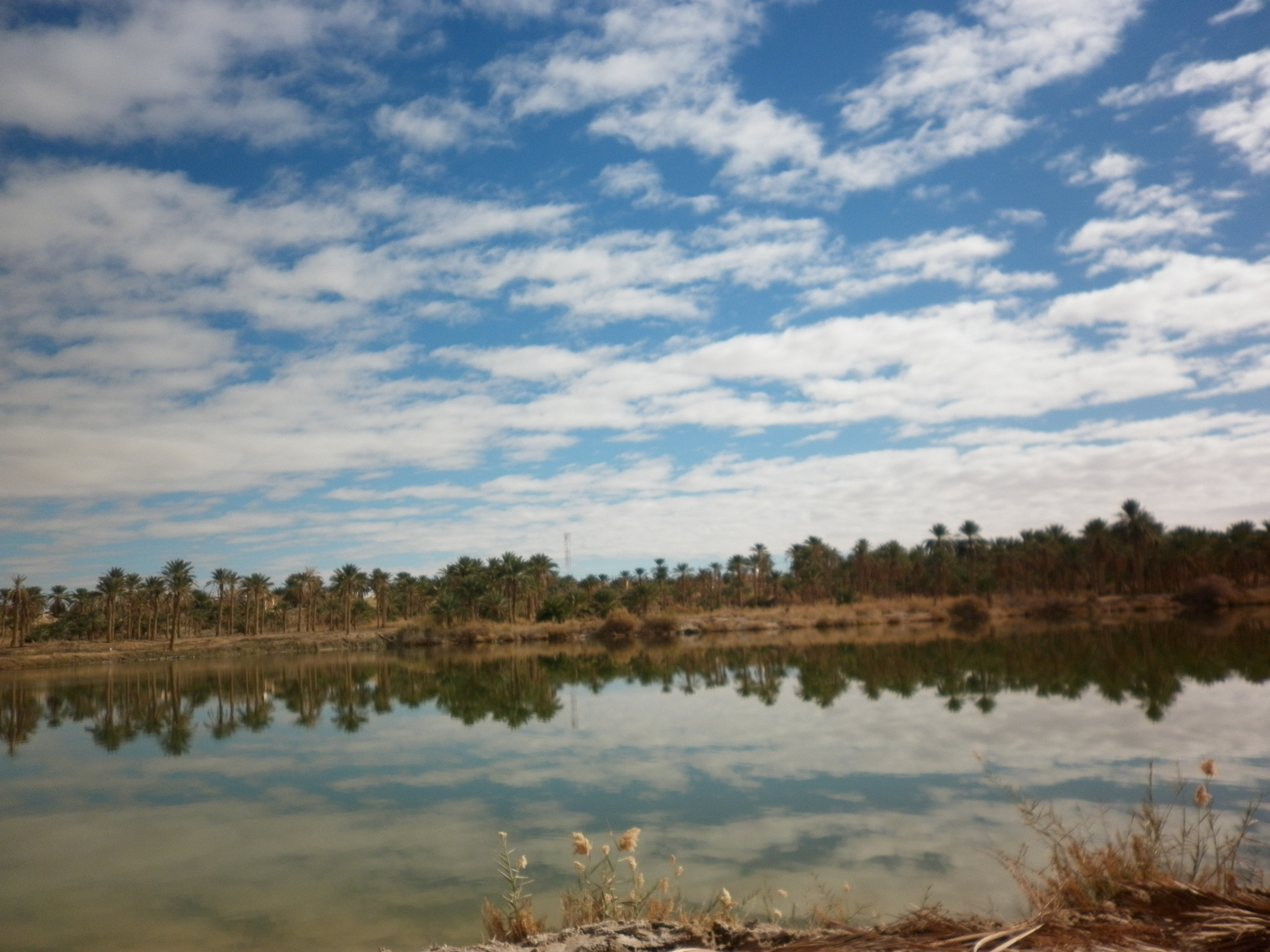
Megarine Oasis, Tunisia

Vegetation within a site varies by soil salinity and sand tenure; these typically vary by distance from the center of a salt pan. Common species include Picklegrass (Salicornia), the generally subshrub genera Salsola, Saltbush (Atriplex), Halocnemum strobilaceum, and White wormwood (Artemisia herba-alba).

While there are some large mammals in these areas, the most common mammals are gerbils (the North African gerbil Gerbillus campestris and the Dipodillus). An example of species diversity is that of the Chott el Hodna, in which have been identified 550 species of plants, 119 species of birds, 10 of reptiles and 20 of mammals. Animals of conservation in this area include the vulnerable Cuvier's gazelle (Gazella cuvieri) and the vulnerable Houbara bustard (Chlamydotis undulata).

== Protected areas ==
Over 25% of the ecoregion is officially protected. These protected areas include:

- Chott el Djerid
