= Northeastern Brazil marine ecoregion =

Tropical marine ecoregion

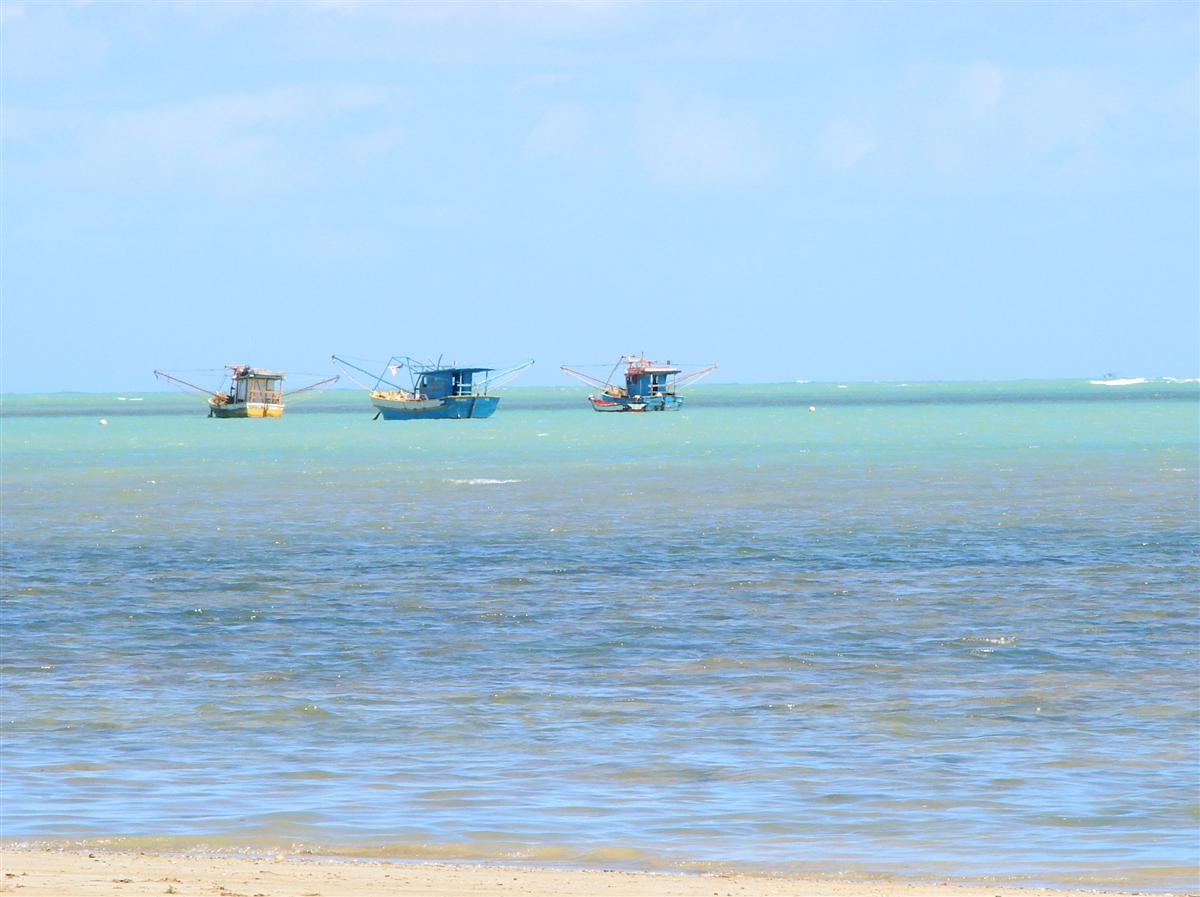
- Fishing at the mouth of the São Francisco River

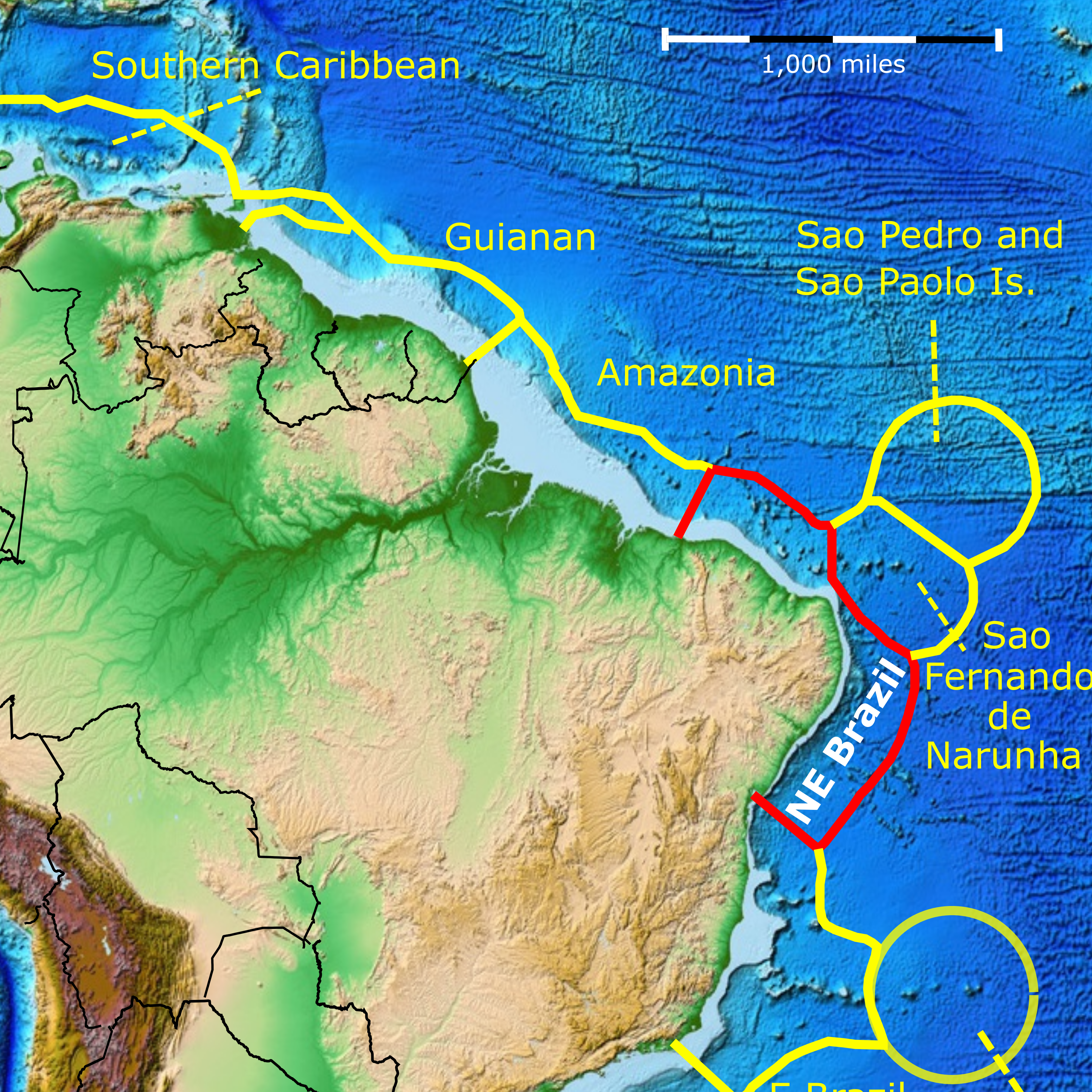
- Marine ecoregion boundaries (red line)

Ecology
- Realm: Tropical Atlantic
- Province: Tropical Southwestern Atlantic
- Borders (mangrove): Rio Piranhas mangroves

Geography
- Country: Brazil

The Northeastern Brazil marine ecoregion covers the coastal marine environment around the Northeast Region of Brazil. The marine ecoregion extends from the mouth of the Parnaíba River in the west around the eastern point of the Brazilian mainland and south to the Bay of All Saints. The warm South Equatorial Current feeds warm tropical water into the region from the east. The Northeastern Brazil ecoregion is one of two coastal marine ecoregions (with the Eastern Brazil marine ecoregion) in the Tropical Southwest Atlantic marine province. It is thus part of the Tropical Atlantic realm.

== Physical setting ==
The ecoregion reaches out into the Atlantic Ocean for 200-250 miles from the coast, with narrowing in the middle where the Fernando de Noronha and Atol das Rocas marine ecoregion extends almost in to the shore. The ecoregion is bounded on the west at the mouth of the Parnaiba River and stretches for 1,000 coastal miles to the southeast, where the ecoregion transitions to the Northeast Brazil marine ecoregion at the Bay of All Saints. The bordering coast is low and flat, and characterized by mangrove forests, such those of the Rio Piranhas mangroves terrestrial ecoregion, and the flat plains of the Zona da Mata on the east coast. The major rivers feeding the Northeastern Brazil marine region include the Paraiba, Jaguaribe, Piranhas, Mamanguape, Paraiba do Norte, Tracunhaém, Capibaribe, and São Francisco rivers.

The continental shelf along this coast of Brazil does not extend far into the sea, typically dropping off onto the slope at about 30 miles. The deepest point in the ecoregion overall is −3,405 metres (−11,171 ft), and the average is −87 metres (−285 ft).

== Currents and climate ==
The Atlantic South Equatorial Current (SEC) flows directly into the ecoregion from the East, bringing warm water from the South Atlantic Ocean. As the SEC approaches the eastern point of Brazil at Cape São Roque, it splits, with the North Brazil Current (NBC) flowing along the coast to the north and west, and the Brazil Current flowing south along the eastern coast. The NBC flows at a rate averaging 26 Sverdrups (Sv), at a mean speed of 60–100 centimetres per second (1.3–2.2 mph). Surface temperatures range from 22–28.5 °C (71.6–83.3 °F).

== Animals and fish ==
On the coast, fishing is typically by artisal (subsistence and traditional) methods. The commercial fishery is centered on shrimp, lobster, and southern red snapper. Farther offshore are fisheries for tuna and Brazilian sardinella (Sardinella brasiliensis). Volumes of catch have fallen to half of the peaks in the 1970s and 1980's due to overfishing.

== Conservation status ==
Many of the terrestrial protected areas on the coast have marine components, such that about 13% of the ecoregion is protected, including:

- Santa Isabel Biological Reserve. A coastal strip of sandbanks and mangroves.
