= Rio Piranhas mangroves =

350-km-long forest ecosystem of Brazil's Atlantic coast

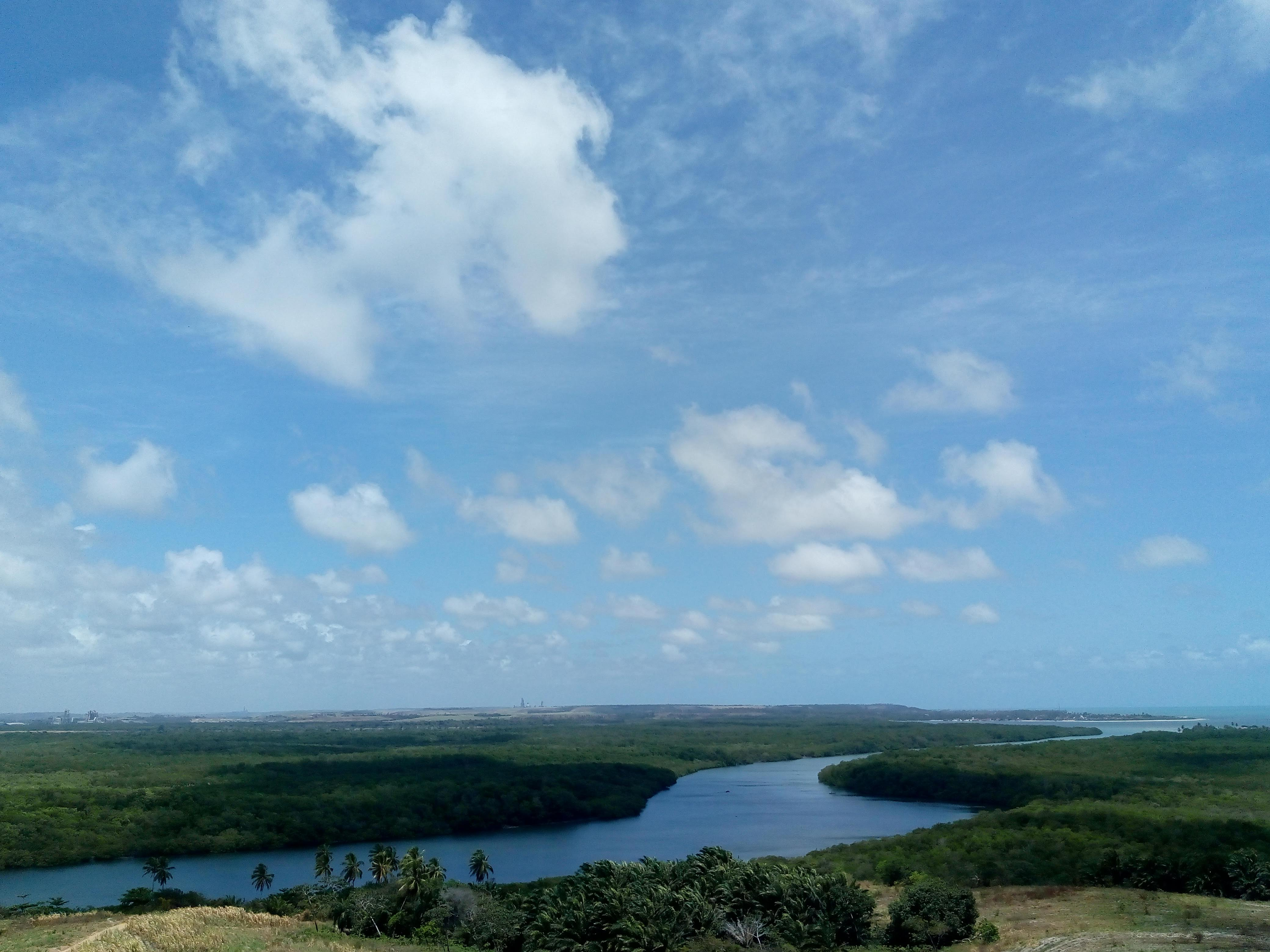
- Acaú-Goiana Extractive Reserve

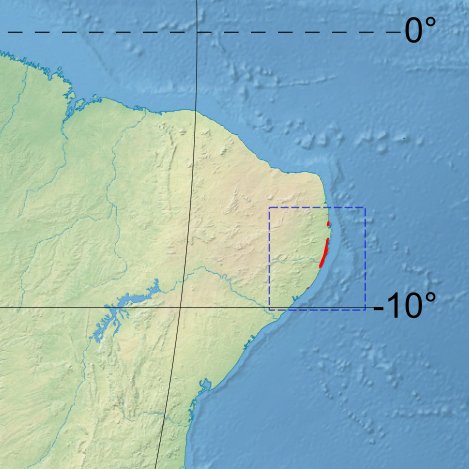
- Ecoregion territory (in purple)

Ecology
- Realm: Neotropic
- Biome: Mangroves

Geography
- Area: 2,072 km^{2} (800 sq mi)
- Country: Brazil

The Rio Piranhas mangroves ecoregion (WWF ID: NT1432) covers a series of mangrove forests along the Atlantic Ocean coast of the eastern tip of Brazil. The mangrove sections are spread across 350 km, from the mouth of the Mamanguape River in the north, to the vicinity of Maceió in the south. This coast is centered on the city of Recife, and the mangrove sections often surround industrial ports and cities.

== Location and description ==
There are five major, separate mangrove sectors in this ecoregion (north to south):

- Mamanguape River, a river estuary in Paraíba State,
- Paraíba do Norte River, with a large estuary north of the Paraiba capital city of João Pessoa
- Pernambuco State sector, extending 50 km north and south on the coast from the major city of Recife. The section includes the estuaries of the Tracunhaém River, Pirapama River, and Ipojuca River
- Mundaú Lagoon, at the city of Maceió, Alagoas State
- São Miguel River (Alagoas), an estuary in Alagoas State.

North of Recife, the interior territory to the mangroves is the Pernambuco interior forests ecoregion. To the south of Recife it is the Pernambuco coastal forests ecoregion.

== Climate ==
The climate of the ecoregion is Tropical monsoon climate (Köppen climate classification (Am)). This climate is characterized by relatively even temperatures throughout the year (all months being greater than 18 °C (64 °F) average temperature), and a pronounced dry season. The driest month has less than 60 mm of precipitation, but more than (100-(average/25) mm. This climate is mid-way between a tropical rainforest and a tropical savannah. The dry month usually at or right after the winter solstice in the Northern Hemisphere. Precipitation averages from 1,800 to 2,100 mm/year.

== Flora and fauna ==
The characteristic tree species are red mangrove (Rhizophora mangle), black mangrove (Avicennia shaueriana), and white mangrove (Laguncularia racemosa). Depending on local conditions in any particular sector, these species can stand alone or in different combinations. They are typically 9 to 20 meters in height. Associated species include button mangrove (Conocarpus erectus), Dalbergia ecastaphyllum, parrot-flower (Psittacanthus dichrous); and four species of sea grasses - shoal grass (Halodule wrightii), clover grass (Halophila baillonis), paddle grass (Halophila decipiens), and beaked tasselweed (Ruppia maritima).

The mangroves of the region support the West Indian manatee (Trichechus manatus), and the area is important for migratory birds.

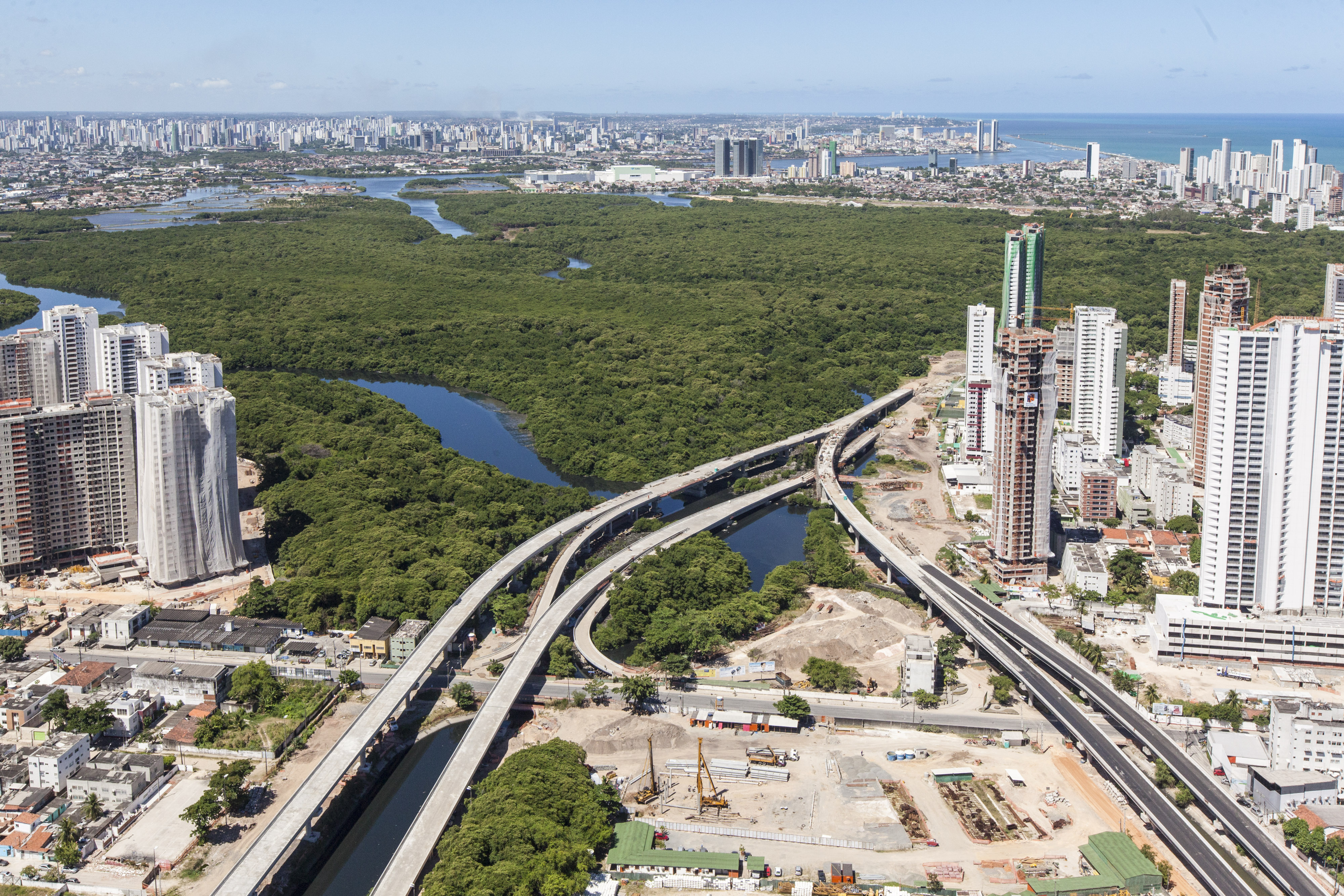
Parque dos Manguezais, a large urban mangrove forest in Recife

== Protected areas ==
Officially protected areas in the ecoregion include:

- Área de Relevante Interesse Ecológica Manguezais da Foz do Rio Mamanguape
- Acaú-Goiana Extractive Reserve
