= América Football Club =

América Football Club may refer to:

== Brazil ==
- América Football Club (PR) from Curitiba, Paraná
- América Football Club (CE) from Fortaleza, Ceará
- America Football Club (Rio de Janeiro) from Rio de Janeiro
- América Futebol Clube (AC) from Rio Branco, Acre
- América Futebol Clube (AL), São Luís do Quitunde
- América Futebol Clube (AM), Manaus
- América Futebol Clube (Vitória), Vitória
- América Futebol Clube (GO), Morrinhos
- América Futebol Clube (MG), Belo Horizonte
  - América Futebol Clube (MG) (women), their women's team
- América Futebol Clube (Teófilo Otoni), Teófilo Otoni
- América Futebol Clube (Caaporã), Caaporã
- América Futebol Clube (Pernambuco), Paulista
- América Futebol Clube (Três Rios), Três Rios
- América Futebol Clube (RN), Natal
- América Futebol Clube (SE), Propriá
- América Futebol Clube (SC), Joinville
- América Futebol Clube (SP), São José do Rio Preto

== Colombia ==
- América de Cali

== Ecuador ==
- América de Manta
- América de Quito

== Haiti ==
- América des Cayes

== Mexico ==
- Club América, Mexico City

== Nicaragua ==
- América Managua

== Venezuela ==
- América F.C. (Venezuela)
