= Paraba caapora =

Scientific classification
- Kingdom: Animalia
- Phylum: Platyhelminthes
- Order: Tricladida
- Family: Geoplanidae
- Genus: Paraparaba
- Species: P. caapora

Binomial name
- Paraba caapora (Froehlich, 1957) Carbayo et al, 2013

Synonyms
- Geoplana (Geoplana) caapora Froehlich, 1957

Species of flatworm

Paraba caapora is a species of land planarian belonging to the subfamily Geoplaninae. It is found within Brazil.

== Description ==
Paraba caapora has a broad body with subparallel margins, reaching up to 21 mm in length. Both ends of the body are blunt. The dorsum is a light brown color, and the marginal zone is dark grey, with several light spots marking halos of the eyes. At the middle of that zone, the grey darkens into an almost black color. The middle of the dorsum in general has irregular grey to black mottled patches. The front end is mottled as well. The ventral side of the body is light grey.

== Etymology ==
The origin of the specific epithet is not specified in the original description. Due to the fact that the species was not discovered near the municipality of Caaporã, the name could be derived from the Tupi-Guarani words caá and pora, which translates literally to "bush dweller".
