= Goiana =

Town in Pernambuco, Brazil

- Municipality
- The Municipality of Goiana
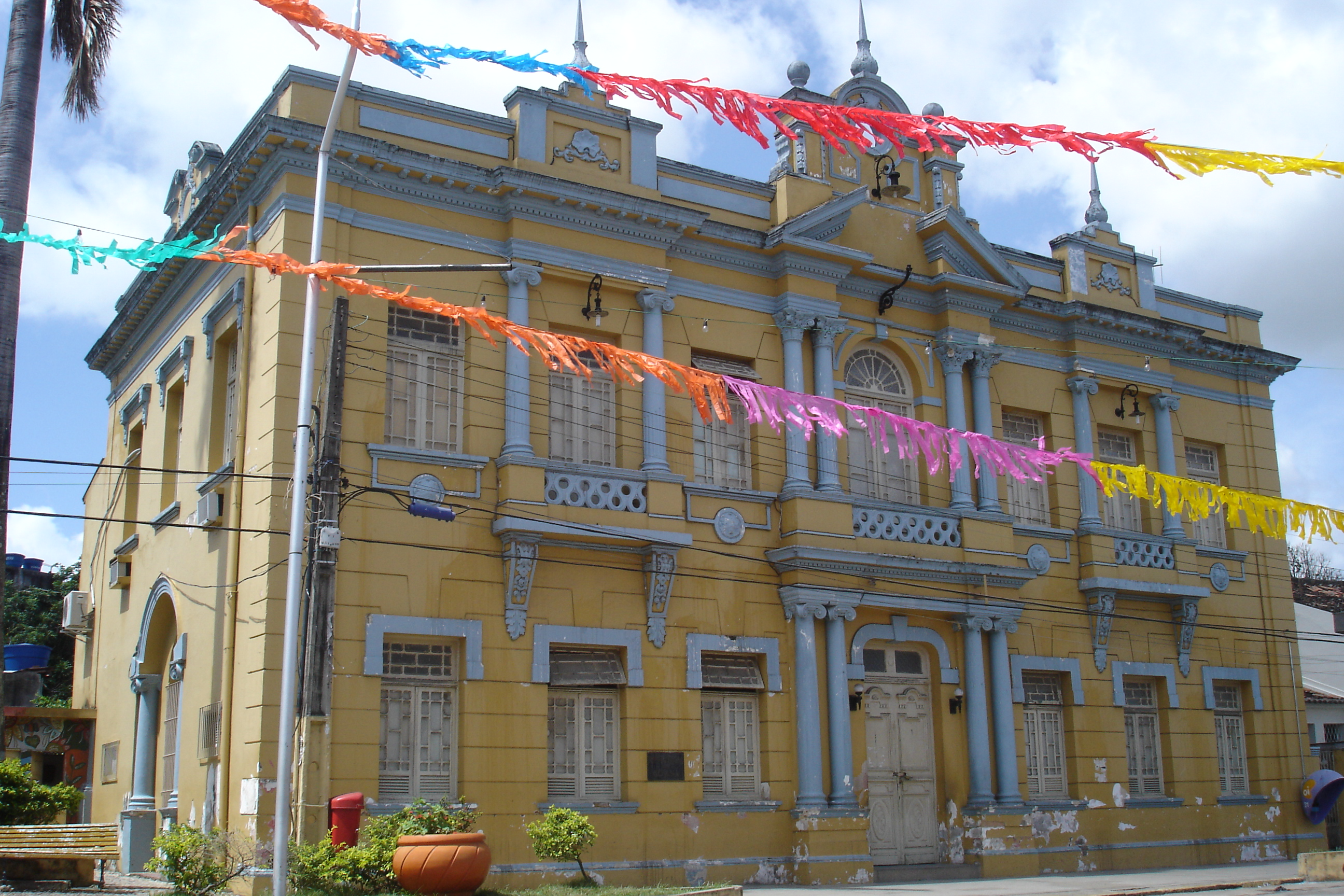
- Goiana town hall

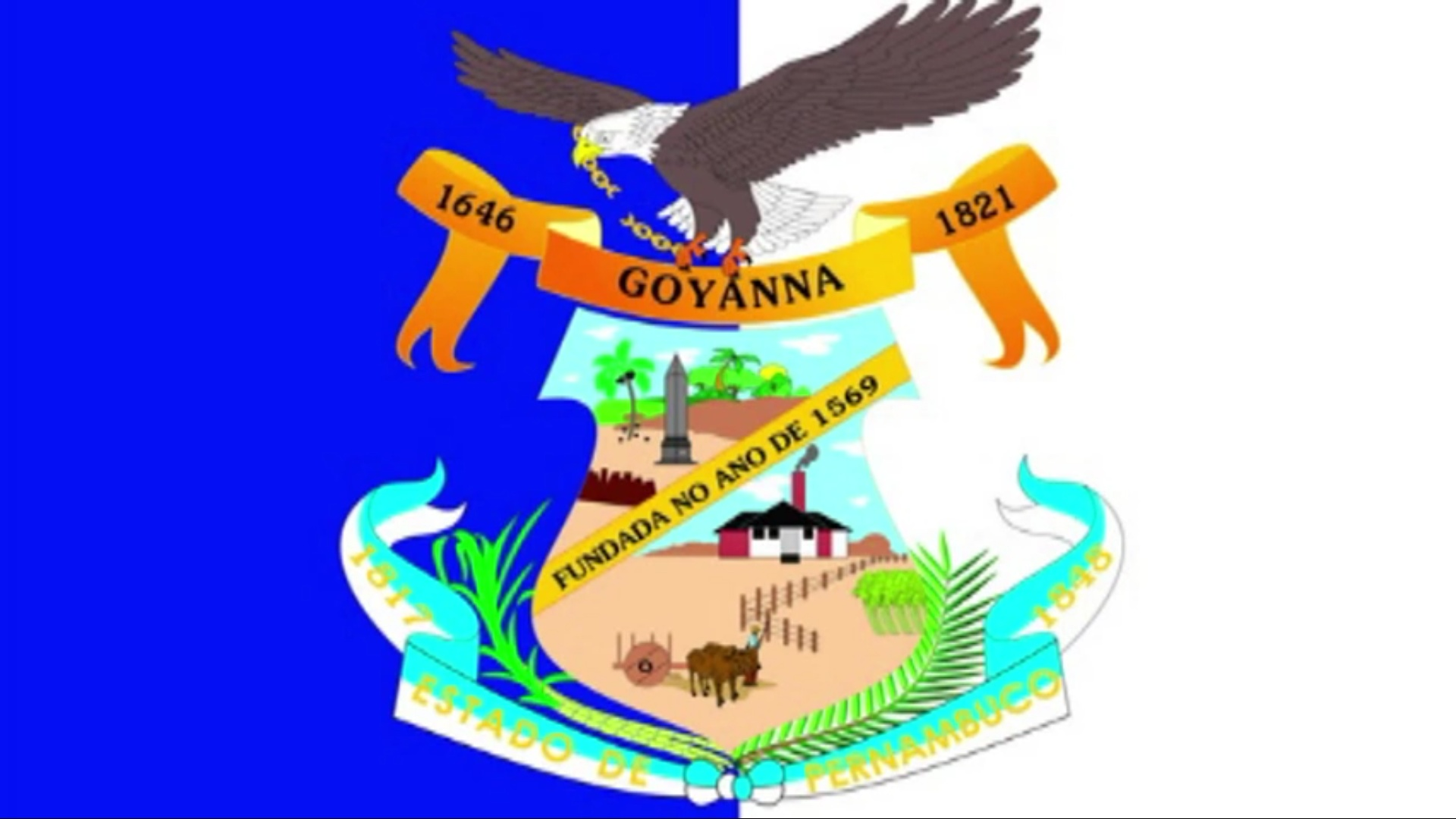
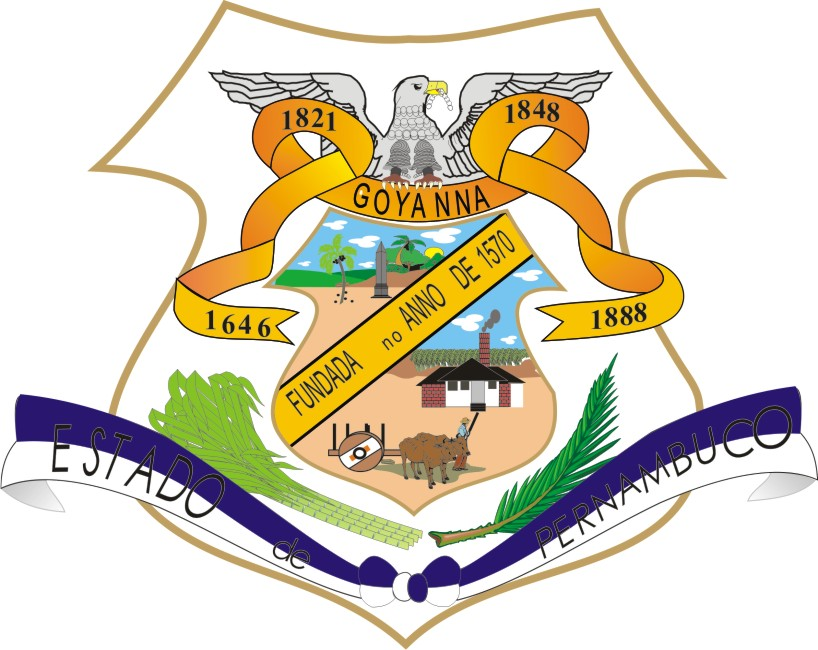
- Flag Coat of arms
- Nicknames: One Museum Open at the Earth (Um museu aberto ao mundo), A Cidade do Futuro (City of Future)
- Location within Brazil
- Coordinates: 07°33′39″S 35°00′10″W
- Country: Brazil
- Region: Northeast
- State: Pernambuco
- Municipal seat: August 3, 1892

Government
  - Mayor: Eduardo Honório (PSL, 2021 – 2024)(current)

Area
  - Total: 501.17 km^{2} (193.50 sq mi)
- Elevation: 13 m (43 ft)

Population (2022 Census)
  - Total: 81,055
  - Estimate (2025): 85,497
  - Density: 150.72/km^{2} (390.4/sq mi)
- Time zone: UTC−3 (BRT)
- Postal Code: 55900-000
- HDI (2010): 0.651 – medium

Goiana (Portuguese: [gojˈɐ̃nɐ]) is a city in Brazil in the northeast of the state of Pernambuco, roughly 65 km north of the city of Recife, 51 km from the capital of Paraíba and 2,187 km from Brasília.

Its historic center was declared a National Historic Landmark in 1938. It also has the easternmost continental point in its state, at Ponta do Funil in the coastal district of Ponta de Pedras.

== Geography ==
Goiana is built on a fertile plain between the Tracunhaém River and Capibaribe River near their confluence, where they merge to form the Goiana River. The town is around is 25 km from the coast. It is also the easternmost city in Pernambuco. The town is the commercial centre for one of the richest agricultural districts of the state, which produces sugar, rum, coffee, tobacco, cotton, cattle, hides and castor oil. Goiana is one of the oldest towns in the state, and was occupied by the Dutch from 1636 to 1654.

The municipality contains most of the 6,677 hectares (16,500 acres) Acaú-Goiana Extractive Reserve, a sustainable use conservation unit created in 2007.

== History ==
Originally occupied by Brazilian Indians, Caetés and Potiguaras, the village became a parish in 1568 when Portuguese explorer Diogo Dias bought ten thousand fathoms of land near the present city, then the Captaincy of Itamaracá, establishing a fortified ingenuity in the valley of the Tracunhaém River. In 1574, the Potiguara population attacked the Tracunhaém sugar plantation, exterminating its entire population. This incident caused the end of the captaincy of Itamaracá and the creation of captaincy of Nova Paraíba.

On April 24, 1646, fitted with sticks, stones, pots, pepper and boiling water, the women of Tejucupapo, a small district of the city, won against the Dutch, who had threatened their land and families.

Goiana became a town on January 15, 1685 and earned forums on May 5, 1840.

== Beaches ==
Carne de Vaca

Carne de Vaca (English: beef meat) is the first beach off the north coast of Pernambuco. It has a narrow sand strip, small waves and banks of sand before the natural reefs during the low tide. It is located in a small village with a few homes. To the north there is the mouth of the Goiana River, and to the south there is the small Doce River.

Pontas de Pedras

The Pontas de Pedras Beach has weak waves, fine sand and a lot of algae. It is located at the core of the village, where several fishing boats are always anchored. Together with Carne de Vaca, this beach is one of the most popular beaches in Goiana.

Barra de Catuama

This beach still retains some native Atlantic forest vegetation.

Catuama Beach

The Catuama Beach has clear water, reefs and wet sand. At low tide, there are sand banks, stones and natural pools. It is located close to the village center, where there is also a church.

Atapuz Beach

The Atapuz Beach is close to the intersection between the Itapessoca River and Santa Cruz channel. Nearby, there is a chapel dedicated to Saint Sebastian.

Tabatinga Beach

The Tabatinga Beach has palm trees, mangrove and holiday summer houses. It is located on a private farm.

== Economy ==
The main economic activities in Goiana are based around the automotive, pharmaceutical and glass industries, with the city hosting three important plants in these segments. The city hosts the most modern assembly plant of the Fiat Chrysler Automobiles (FCA Group), which is responsible for the production of the Jeep Renegade and Fiat Toro. Goiana is also the land of Vivix, one of the biggest float glass industries in Brazil as well as Hemobrás, which produces blood derivatives and coagulation factor products.

Goiana has an important agribusiness sector, especially related to the farming and trading of goats, cattle, pigs, poultry, and plantations of sugarcane and coconuts.

The city is one of the largest sugarcane producers in Pernambuco, with a planted area of 550,000 hectares in 2018.

=== Economic Indicators ===
Population	GDP x(1000 R$).	GDP pc (R$)	PE
85,497	457.986	6.379	0.78%

Economy by Sector 2006

Primary sector	Secondary sector	Service sector
13.21%	29.38%	57.40%

=== Health Indicators ===
HDI (2000)	Hospitals (2007)	Hospitals beds (2007)	Children's Mortality every 1000 (2005)
0.692	3	122	19.8

== Historic structures ==
The historic center of Goiana received provisional status as a national monument by the National Institute of Historic and Artistic Heritage (IPHAN) in 2001. Nine religious structures were designated as national monuments of Brazil in 1938:

- The Church and Convent of Our Lady of Solitude (Convento e Igreja de Nossa Senhora da Soledade)
- The Convento e Igreja de Santo Alberto de Sicília
- Church of the Third Order of Mount Carmel (Igreja da Ordem Terceira do Carmo)
- The Igreja de Nossa Senhora da Conceição
- The Igreja de Nossa Senhora da Misericórdia
- Church of Our Lady of Protection (Igreja de Nossa Senhora do Amparo)
- The Igreja de Nossa Senhora do Rosário dos Pretos
- The Igreja Matriz de Nossa Senhora do Rosário
- The Capela de Santo Antônio - Engenho Novo

== See also ==
- List of municipalities in Pernambuco
- Pernambuco Museums
