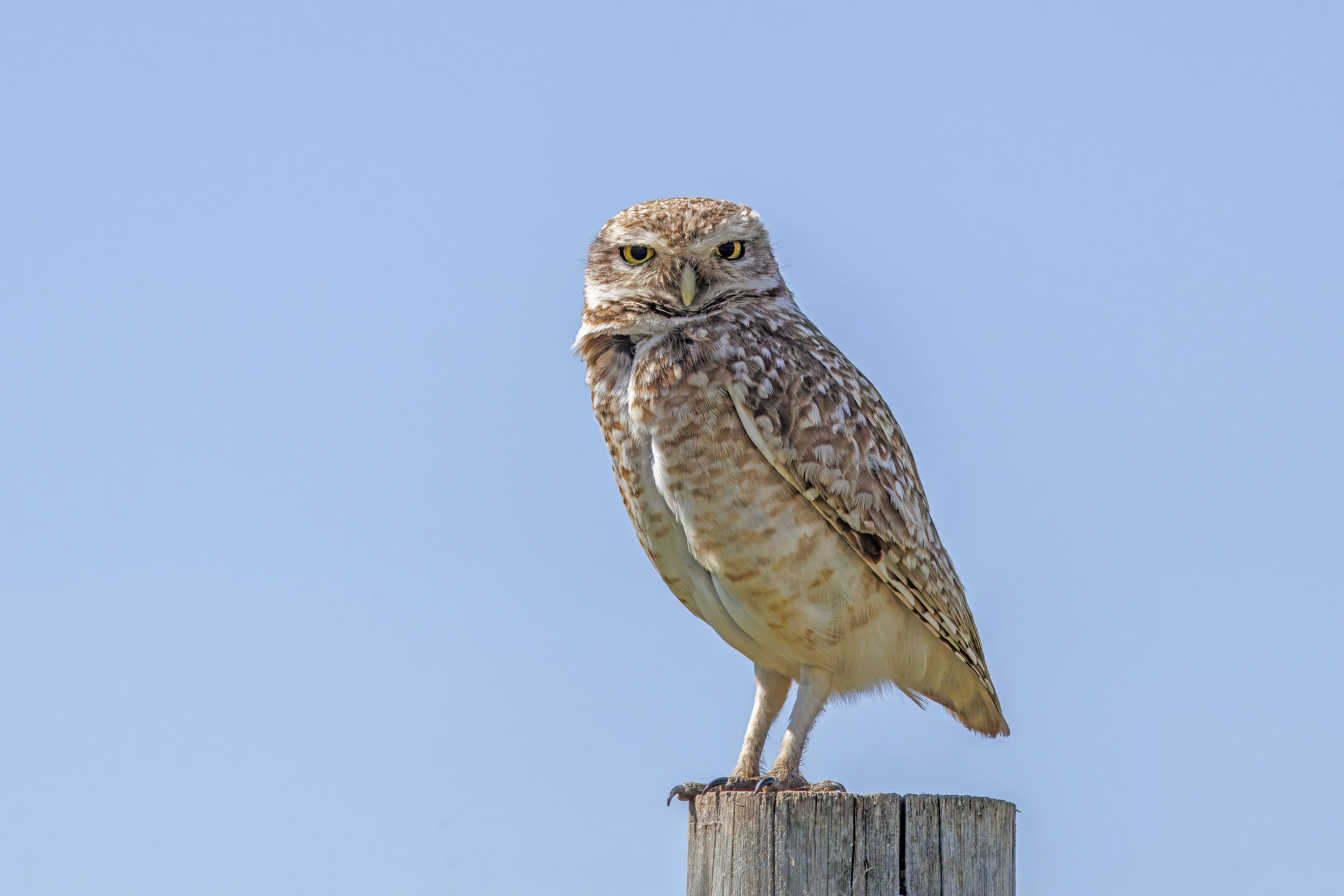
- A. c. cunicularia, Uruguay

Conservation status
- Least Concern (IUCN 3.1)
- CITES Appendix II

Scientific classification
- Kingdom: Animalia
- Phylum: Chordata
- Class: Aves
- Order: Strigiformes
- Family: Strigidae
- Genus: Athene
- Species: A. cunicularia

Binomial name
- Athene cunicularia (Molina, 1782)

Subspecies
- About 20 living, see text
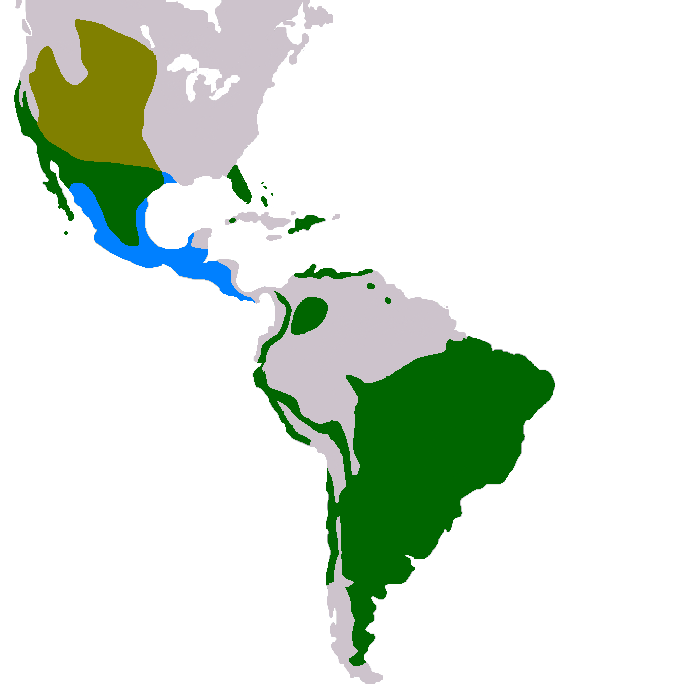
- Range of A. cunicularia Summer breeding range Winter non-breeding range Resident breeding range

Synonyms
- Strix cunicularia Molina, 1782; Speotyto cunicularia Spheotyto cunicularia (lapsus)

= Burrowing owl =

Burrowing owl Temporal range: Late Pleistocene–Recent

Species of owl

The burrowing owl (Athene cunicularia) is a small, long-legged, primarily terrestrial—though not flightless—species of owl native to the open landscapes of North and South America. They are typically found in grasslands, rangelands, agricultural areas, deserts, or any other open, dry area with low vegetation. They nest and roost in burrows, and, despite their common name, do not often construct these dwellings themselves, rather repurposing disused burrows or tunnels previously excavated and inhabited by other species, such as American badgers (Taxidea taxus), foxes (Vulpes sp.), ground squirrels or prairie dogs (Cynomys spp.), among others.

Unlike most owls, burrowing owls are often active during the day, although they tend to avoid the heat of midday. But, similar to many other species of owls, they are mostly crepuscular hunters, as they can utilize their night vision and attuned hearing to maximum potential during sunrise and sunset. Having evolved to live on open grasslands and prairie habitat (as well as badlands, chaparral and desert ecosystems), as opposed to dense forest, the burrowing owl has developed longer legs than other owls, a trait which enables it to sprint when pursuing its prey, not dissimilarly to the greater roadrunner, as well as providing momentum when taking flight; however, burrowing owls typically only become airborne for short bursts, such as when fleeing threats, and typically do not fly very high off of the ground.

== Taxonomy ==
The burrowing owl was formally described by Spanish naturalist Juan Ignacio Molina in 1782 under the binomial name Strix cunicularia from a specimen collected in Chile. The specific epithet is from the Latin cunicularius, meaning "burrower" or "miner". The burrowing owl is now placed in the genus Athene which was introduced by German zoologist Friedrich Boie in 1822.

The burrowing owl is sometimes classified in the monotypic genus Speotyto (based on an overall unique morphology and karyotype). Osteology and DNA sequence data, though, suggests that the burrowing owl is a terrestrial member of the little owls genus (Athene), thus it is placed in that group today by most authorities.

A considerable number of subspecies have been described, though they differ little in appearance; the taxonomic validity of several is still up for debate. Most subspecies are found in or near the Andes and within the Antilles of the Caribbean Sea. Although distinct from each other, the relationship of the Florida subspecies, for instance, to (and its distinctness from) the Caribbean owls, is not quite clear.

The 18 recognised subspecies, of which two are now extinct, are:

- †A. c. amaura (Lawrence, 1878): Antiguan burrowing owl – formerly Antigua and Saint Kitts and Nevis; extinct (circa 1905)
- A. c. boliviana (L. Kelso, 1939): Bolivian burrowing owl – the Bolivian altiplano
- A. c. brachyptera (Richmond, 1896): Margarita Island burrowing owl – Margarita Island (may include A. c. apurensis)
- A. c. carrikeri (Stone, 1922): East Colombian burrowing owl – Eastern Colombia; doubtfully distinct from A. c. tolimae
- A. c. cunicularia (Molina, 1782):- southern burrowing owl – lowlands of southern Bolivia and southern Brazil south to Tierra del Fuego
- A. c. floridana (Ridgway, 1874): Florida burrowing owl – Florida and the Bahamas; listed as Vulnerable
- A. c. grallaria (Temminck, 1822): Brazilian burrowing owl – Central and eastern Brazil
- †A. c. guadeloupensis (Ridgway, 1874): Guadeloupe burrowing owl – formerly Guadeloupe and Marie-Galante islands; extinct (circa 1890)
- A. c. guantanamensis (Garrido, 2001): Cuban burrowing owl – Cuba and Isla de la Juventud
- A. c. hypugaea (Bonaparte, 1825): western burrowing owl – Southern Canada through the Great Plains, south to Central America; listed as Apparently Secure
- A. c. juninensis (Berlepsch & Stolzmann, 1902): south Andean burrowing owl – Andes Mountains and foothills from central Perú to northwestern Argentina (may include A. c. punensis)
- A. c. minor (Cory, 1918): Guyanese burrowing owl – southern Guyana and Roraima state (Brazil)
- A. c. nanodes (Berlepsch & Stolzmann, 1892): Southwest Peruvian burrowing owl – southwestern Perú (may include A. c. intermedia)
- A. c. pichinchae (Boetticher, 1929): West Ecuadorean burrowing owl – western Ecuador
- A. c. rostrata (C. H. Townsend, 1890): Revillagigedo burrowing owl – Clarion and Revillagigedo Islands
- A. c. tolimae (Stone, 1899): West Colombian burrowing owl – Western Colombia (may include A. c. carrikeri)
- A. c. troglodytes (Wetmore & Swales, 1931): Hispaniolan burrowing owl – Hispaniola (Haiti and the Dominican Republic) and surrounding islands (Gonâve, Beata Island)
- A. c. partridgei (Olrog, 1976): Corrientes burrowing owl – Corrientes Province, Argentina (probably not distinct from A. c. cunicularia)

A paleosubspecies, A. c. providentiae, has been described from fossil remains from the Pleistocene of the Bahamas. How these birds relate to the extant A. c. floridana – that is, whether they were among the ancestors of that subspecies, or whether they represented a more distant lineage that completely disappeared later – is unknown.

In addition, prehistoric fossils of similar owls have been recovered from many islands in the Caribbean (Barbuda, the Cayman Islands, Jamaica, Mona Island and Puerto Rico). These birds became extinct towards the end of the Pleistocene, probably because of ecological and sea-level changes at the end of the last ice age rather than human activity. These fossil owls differed in size from present-day burrowing owls, and their relationship to the modern taxa has not been resolved.

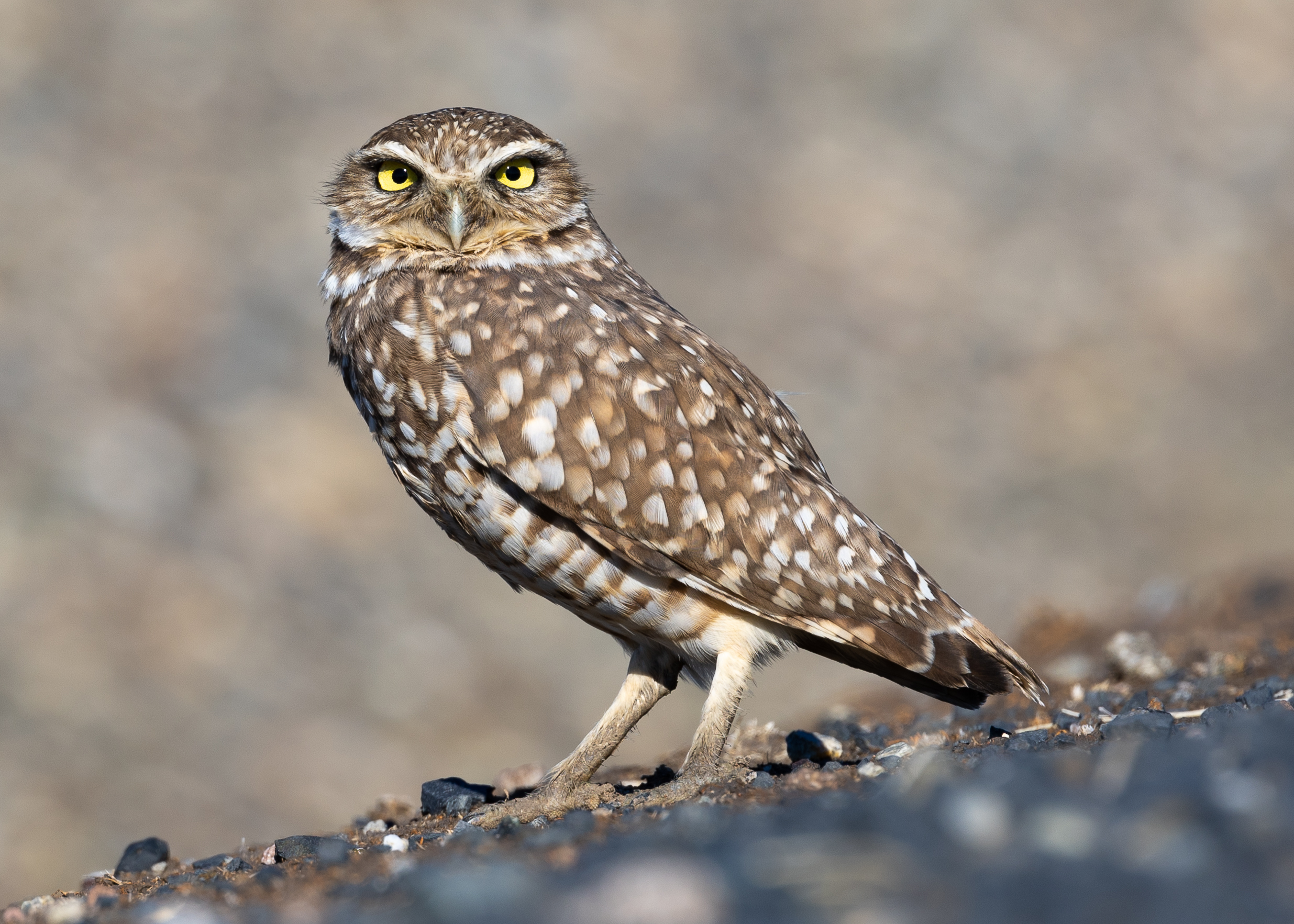
Western burrowing owl (A. c. hypugaea),
California

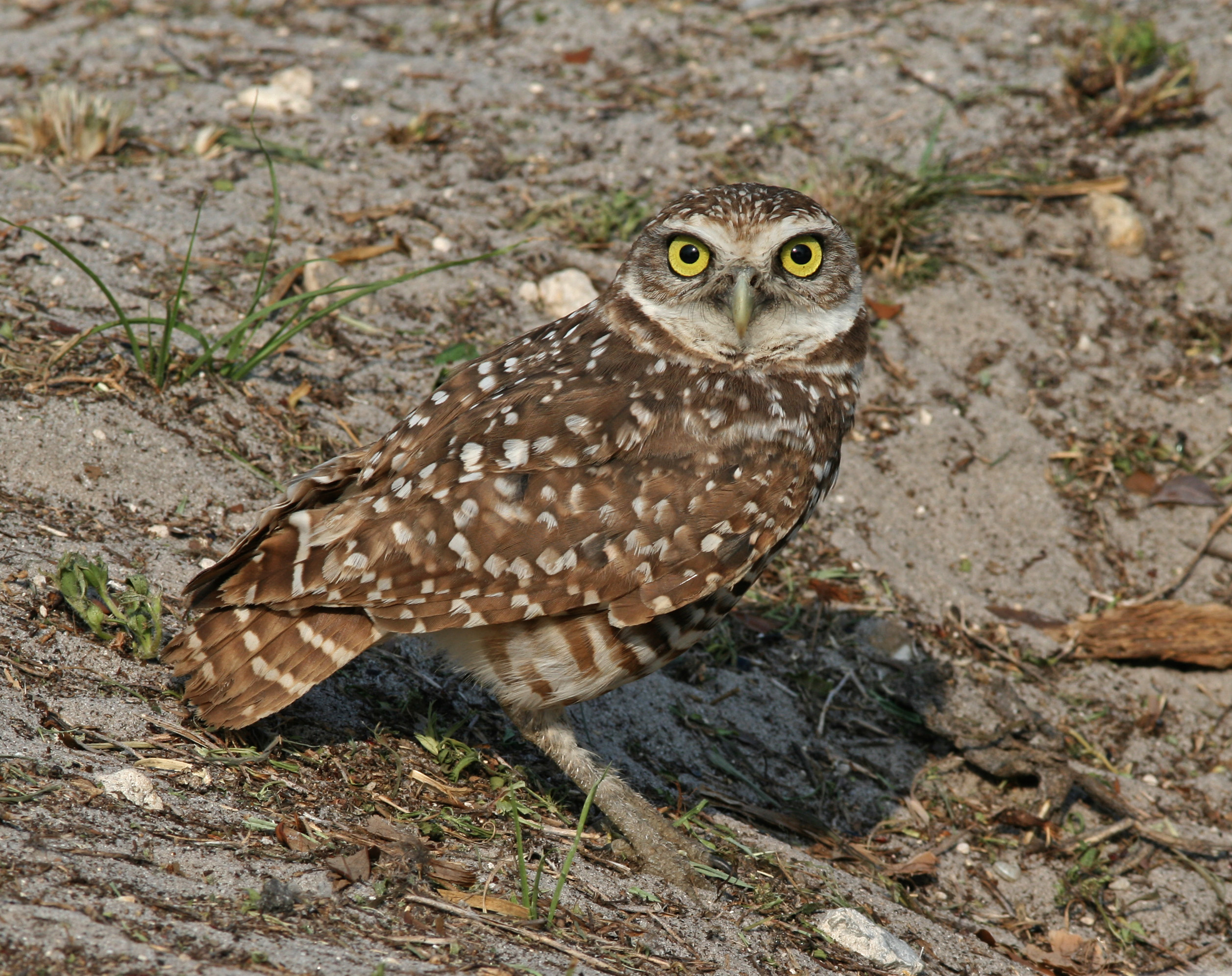
Florida burrowing owl (A. c. floridana),
Florida

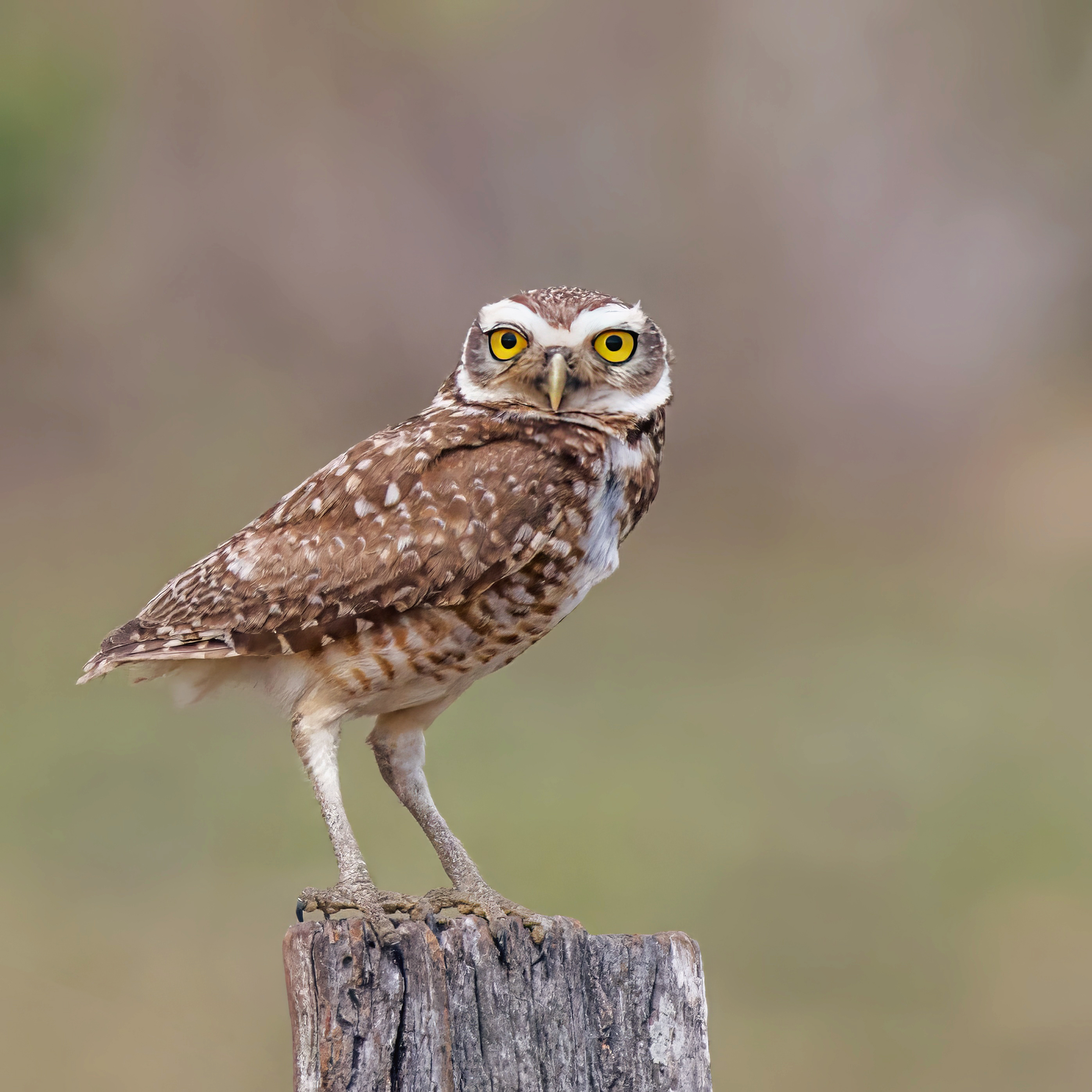
Brazilian burrowing owl
A. c. grallaria
Pantanal, Brazil

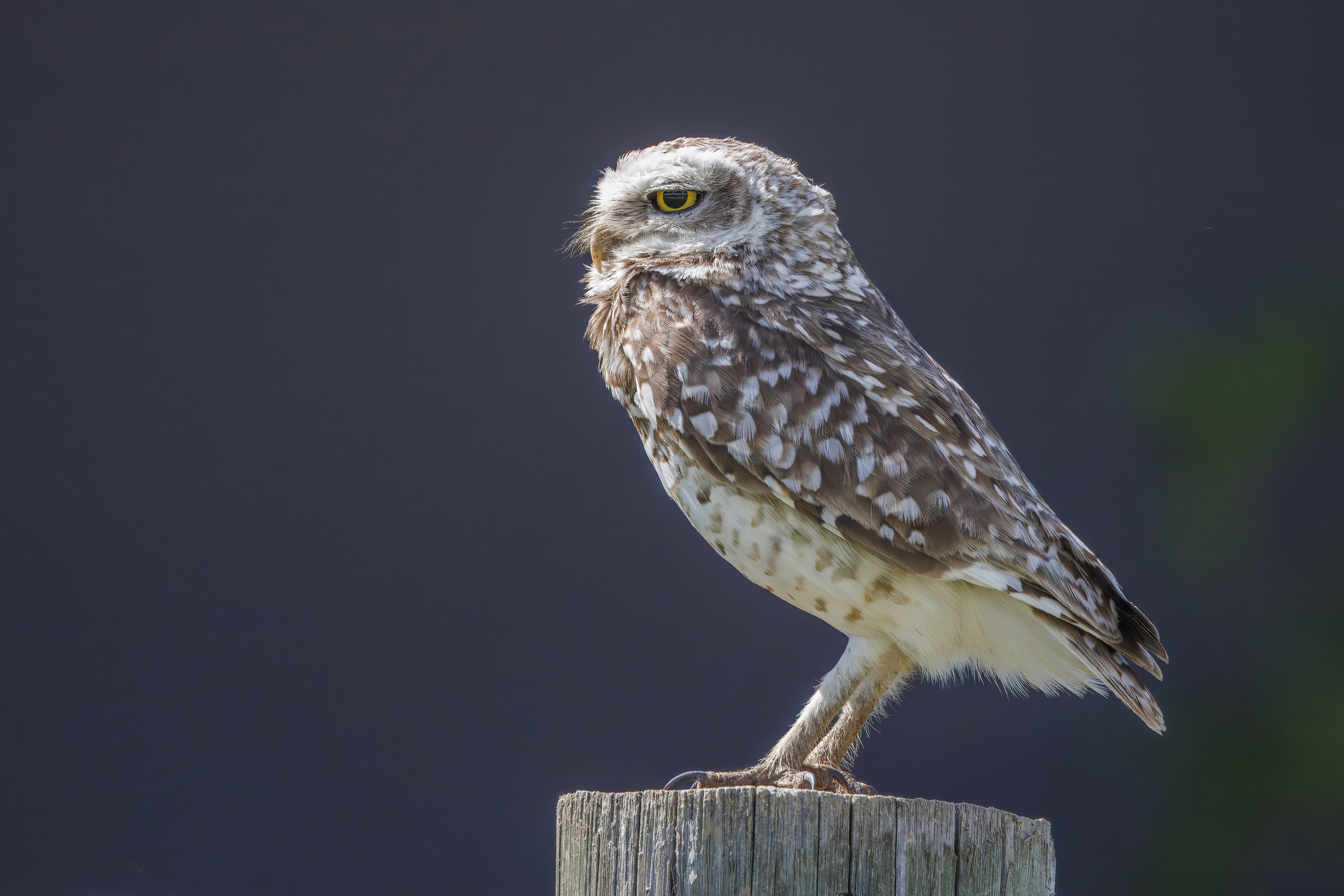
Southern burrowing owl (A. c. cunicularia),
Uruguay

== Description ==
Burrowing owls have bright eyes; their beaks can be dark yellow or gray depending on the subspecies. They lack ear tufts and have a flattened facial disc. The owls have prominent white eyebrows and a white "chin" patch which they expand and display during certain behaviors, such as a bobbing of the head when agitated.

Adults have brown heads and wings with white spotting. Their chests and abdomens are white with variable brown spotting or barring, also depending on the subspecies. Juvenile owls are similar in appearance, but they lack most of the white spotting above and brown barring below. The juveniles have a buff bar across their upper wings and their breasts may be buff-colored rather than white. Burrowing owls of all ages have grayish legs longer than those of other owls.

Males and females are similar in size and appearance, so display little sexual dimorphism. Females tend to be heavier, but males tend to have longer linear measurements (wing length, tail length, etc.). Adult males appear lighter in color than females because they spend more time outside the burrow during daylight, and their feathers become "sun-bleached". The burrowing owl measures 19–28 cm (7–11 in) long and spans 50.8–61 cm (20–24 in) across the wings, and weighs 140–240 g (5–8 oz). As a size comparison, an average adult is slightly larger than an American robin (Turdus migratorius).

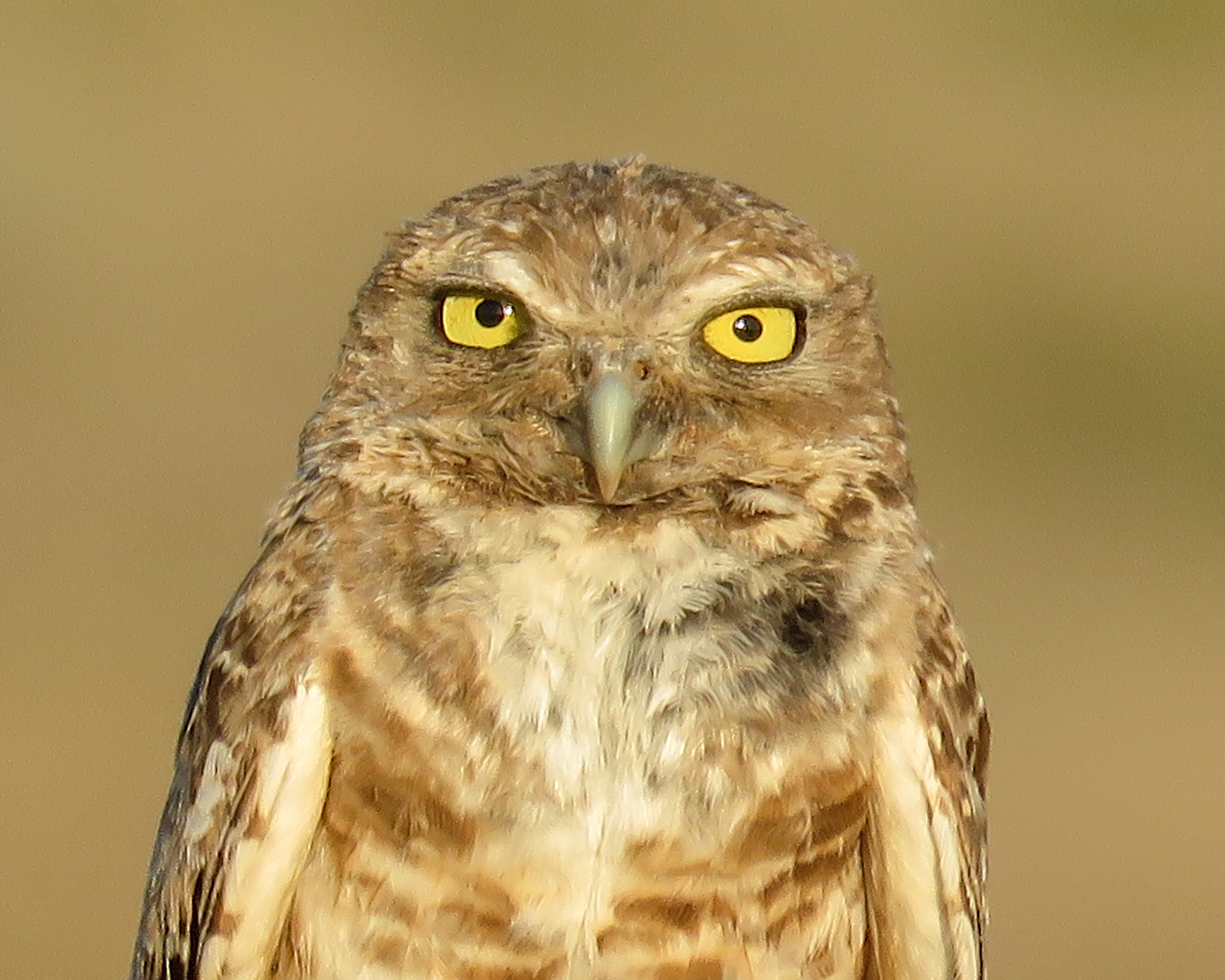
Wild burrowing owl near Santa Fe, New Mexico

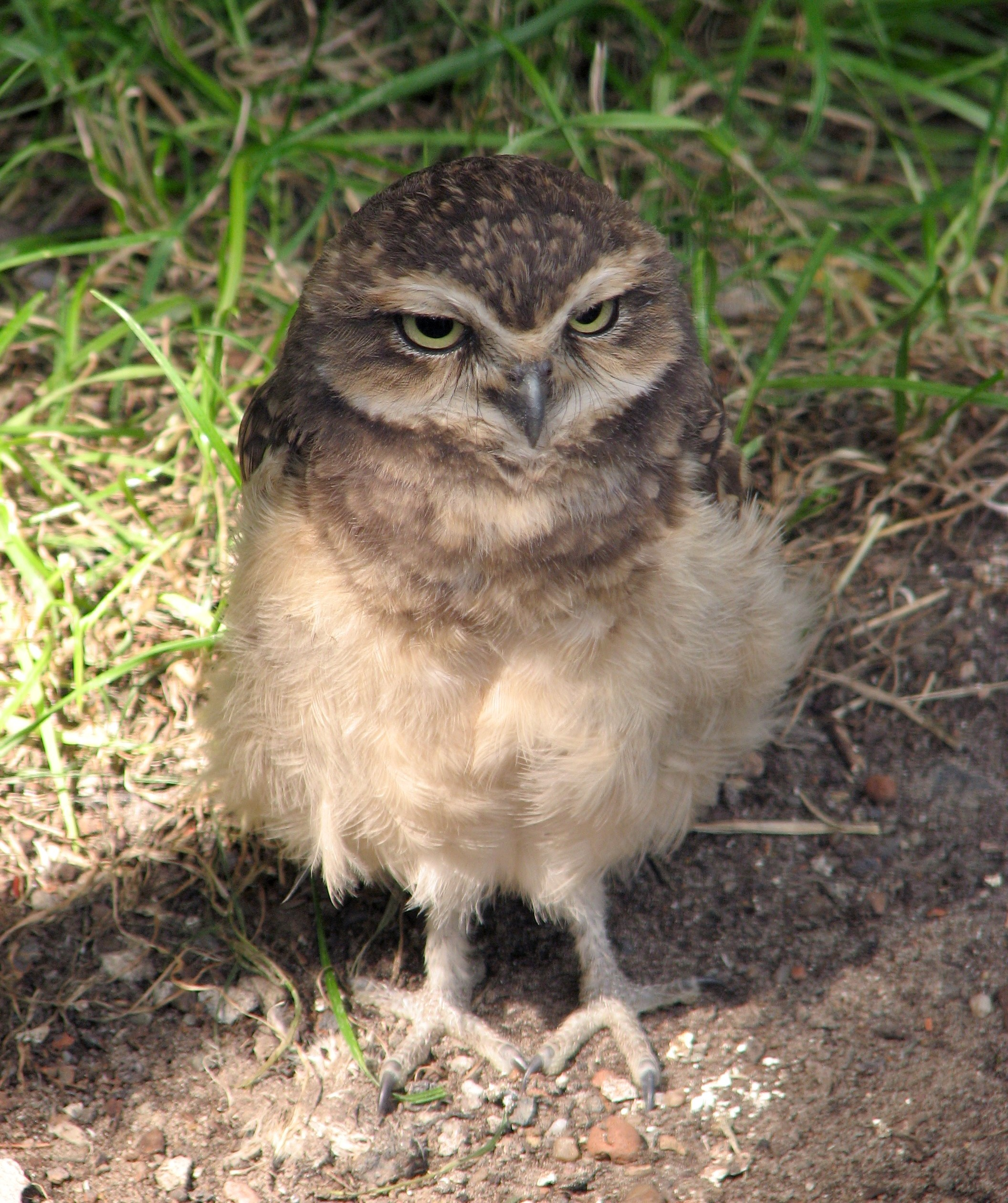
Immature

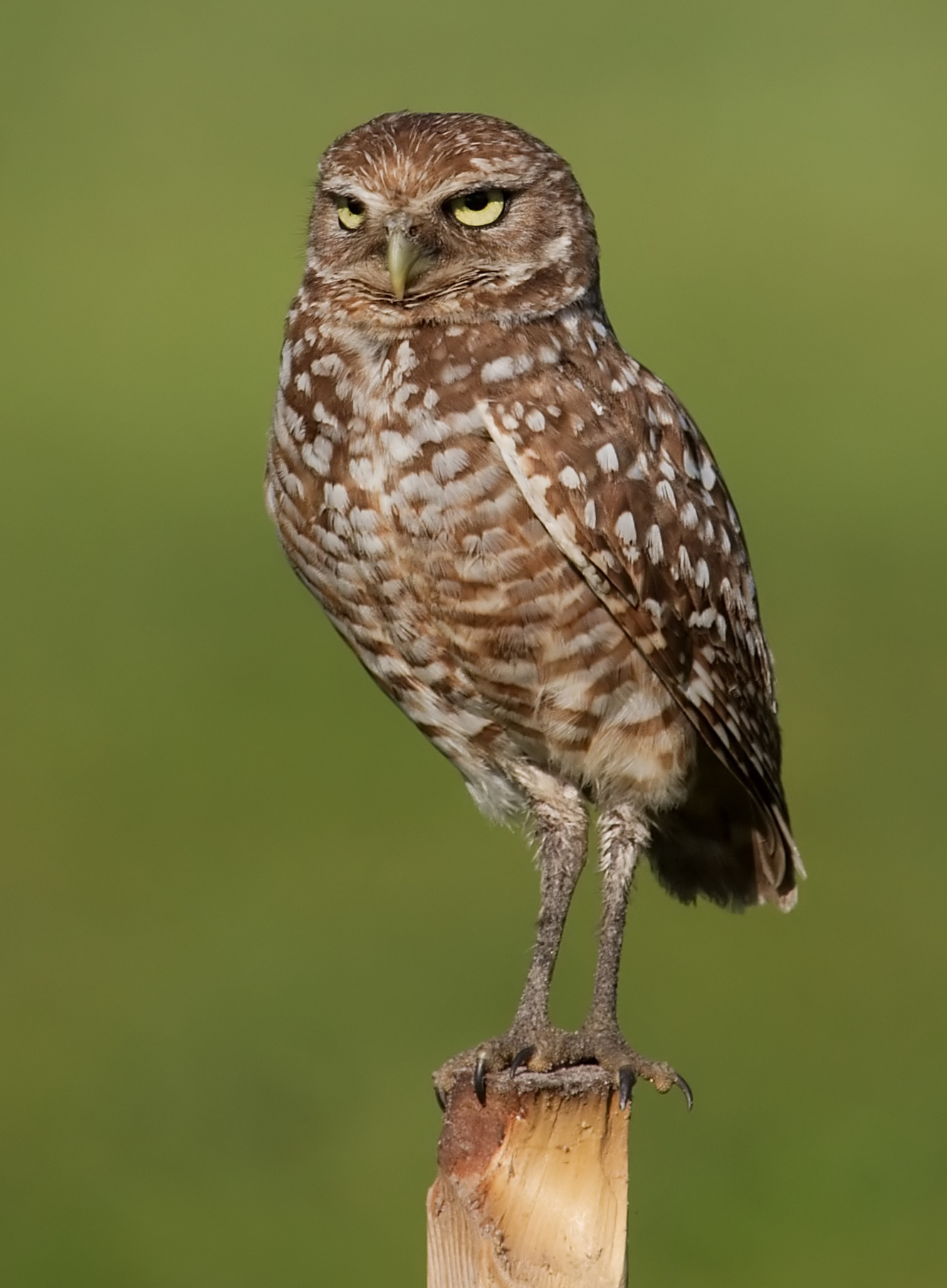
A. c. floridana, adult, Pembroke Pines, Florida

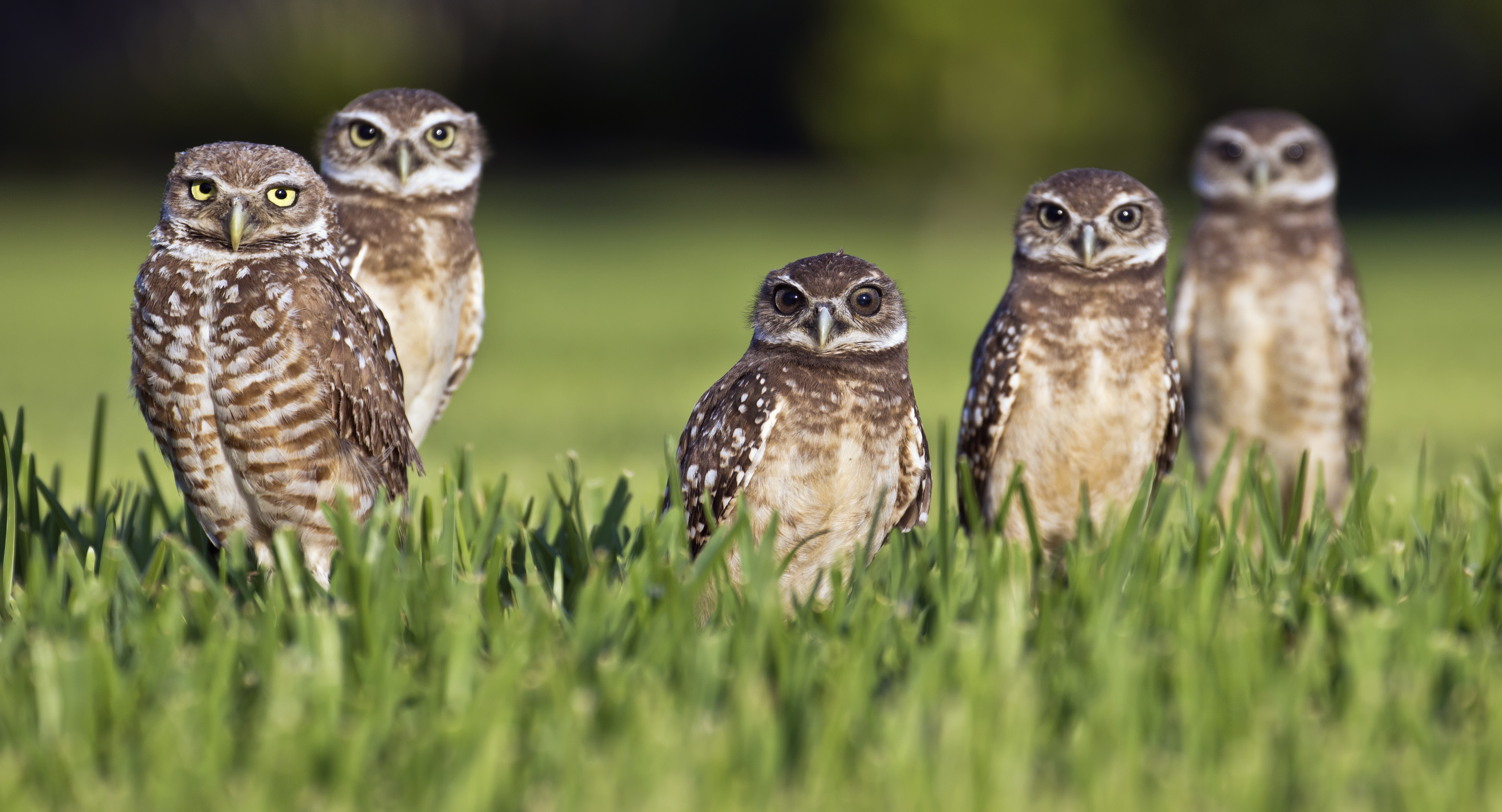
Five southern burrowing owls

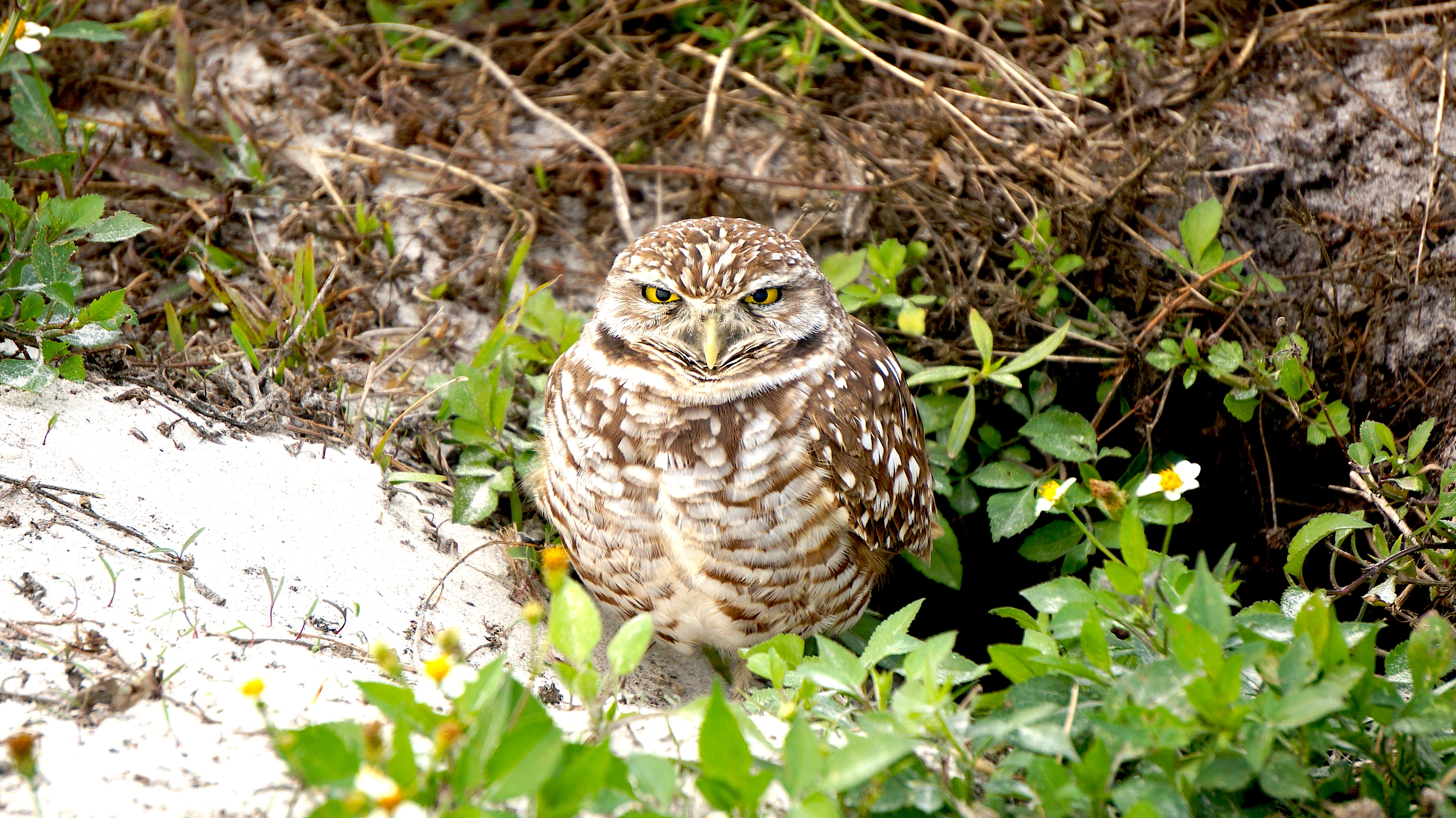
Burrowing owl at Vista View Park, Davie, Florida

== Distribution and habitat ==
Before European colonization, burrowing owls probably inhabited every suitable area of the New World, but in North America, they have experienced some restrictions in distribution since then. In parts of South America, they are expanding their range due to deforestation. The western burrowing owls (A. c. hypugaea) are most common in the Rocky Mountain Arsenal National Wildlife Refuge, as well as in most of the western states. Known resident populations inhabit areas of Colorado, Arizona, New Mexico, Texas and California, where their population is reportedly threatened by human encroachment and construction.

Burrowing owls range from the southern portions of the western Canadian provinces (British Columbia, Alberta, Saskatchewan, Manitoba) and all the way through Mexico to western Panamá. They are also found across the state of Florida, as well as some Caribbean islands. In South America, they are fairly common, and are known to inhabit every country on the continent, with the exception of the dense Amazon rainforest interior and the highest ranges of the Andes Mountains. Their preference is for the cooler, possibly sub-tropical coastal and temperate regions. South of the Amazon, their population seems to again rebound, as they are widely distributed from southern Brazil and the Pantanal down to Patagonia and Tierra del Fuego.

Burrowing owls are year-round residents in most of their range. Birds that breed in Canada and the northern U.S. usually migrate south to Mexico and the southern U.S. during winter months.

== Behaviour and ecology ==
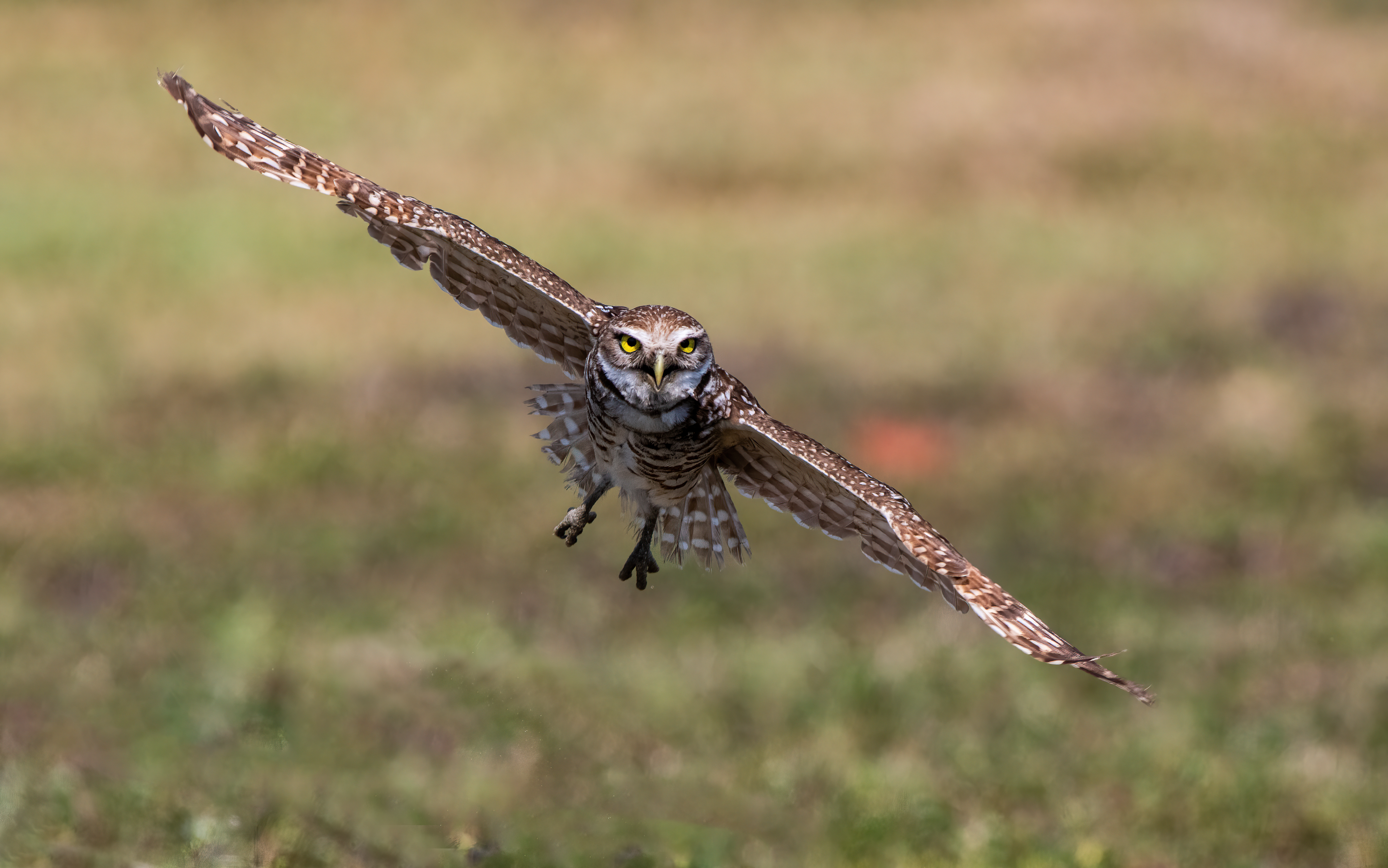
Burrowing owl in flight

This species can live for at least 9 years in the wild and over 10 years in captivity. They are often killed by vehicles when crossing roads, and have many natural enemies, including badgers, coyotes, and snakes. They are also killed by both feral and domestic cats and dogs. Two birds studied in the Parque Nacional de La Macarena of Colombia were free of blood parasites.

Burrowing owls often nest and roost in the burrows made by ground squirrels, a strategy also used by rattlesnakes. When threatened, the owl retreats to the burrow and produces rattling and hissing sounds similar to those of a rattlesnake. The behavior is suggested to be an example of acoustic Batesian mimicry and has been observed to be an effective strategy against animals that are familiar with the dangers posed by rattlesnakes.

=== Breeding ===
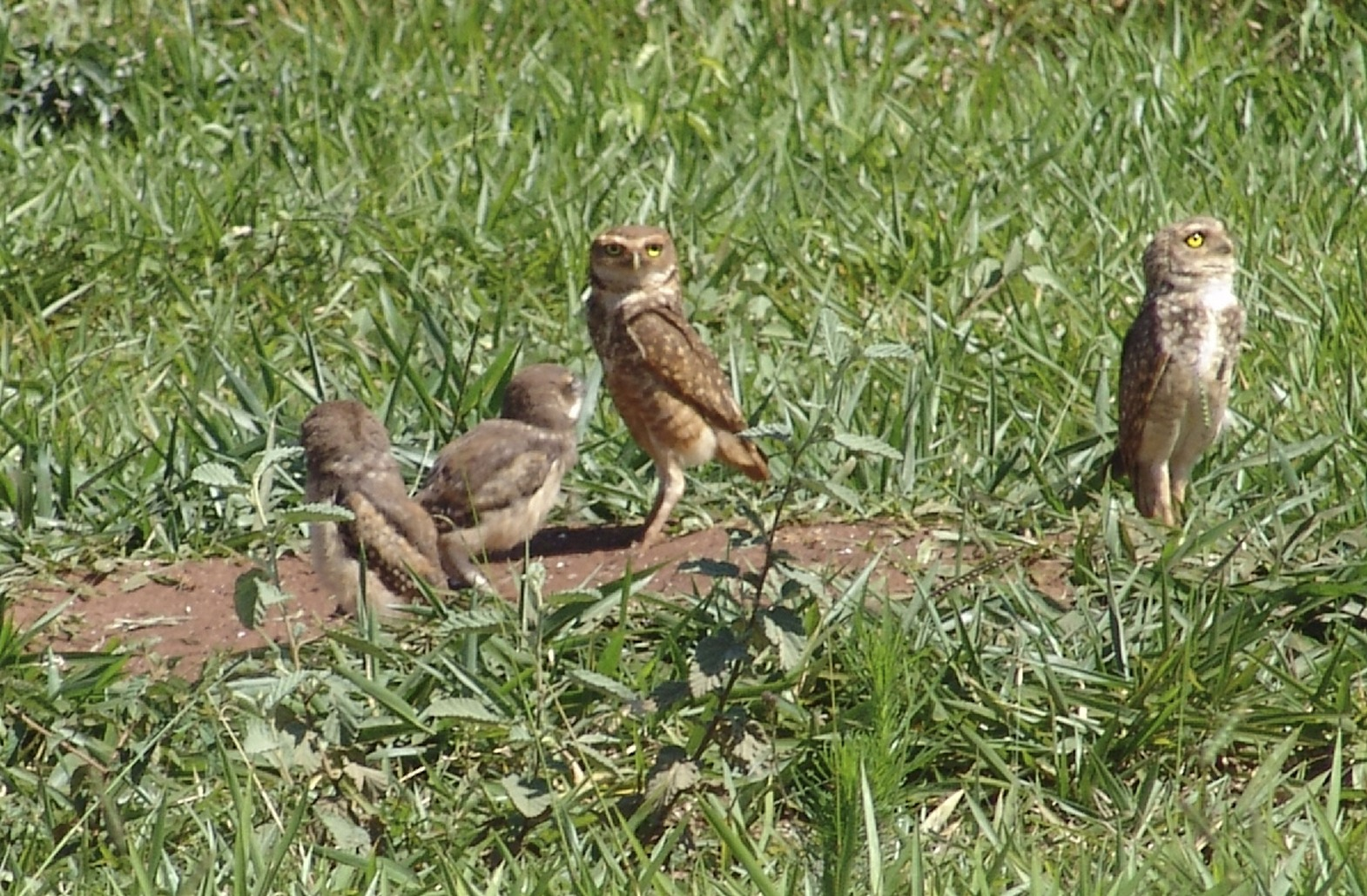
A family of burrowing owls

The nesting season begins in late March or April in North America. Burrowing owls usually only have one mate but occasionally a male will have two mates. Pairs of owls will sometimes nest in loose colonies. Their typical breeding habitat is open grassland or prairie, but they can occasionally adapt to other open areas like airports, golf courses, and agricultural fields. Burrowing owls are slightly tolerant of human presence, often nesting near roads, farms, homes, and regularly maintained irrigation canals.

The owls nest in a burrow, hence the name burrowing owl. If burrows are unavailable and the soil is not hard or rocky, the owls may excavate their own. Burrowing owls will also nest in shallow, underground, man-made structures that have easy access to the surface.

During the nesting season, burrowing owls will collect a wide variety of materials to line their nest, some of which are left around the entrance to the burrow. The most common material is mammal dung, usually from cattle. At one time it was thought that the dung helped to mask the scent of the juvenile owls, but researchers now believe the dung helps to control the microclimate inside the burrow and to attract insects, which the owls may eat.

The female lays an egg every one or two days until she has completed a clutch, which can consist of four to 12 eggs (usually 9). She then incubates the eggs for 3–4 weeks while the male brings her food. After the eggs hatch, both parents feed the chicks. Four weeks after hatching, the chicks can make short flights and begin leaving the nest burrow. The parents still help feed the chicks for 1–3 months.

Site fidelity rates appear to vary among populations. In some locations, owls will frequently reuse a nest several years in a row. Owls in migratory northern populations are less likely to return to the same burrow every year. Also, as with many other birds, the female owls are more likely to disperse to a different site than are male owls.

=== Food and feeding ===
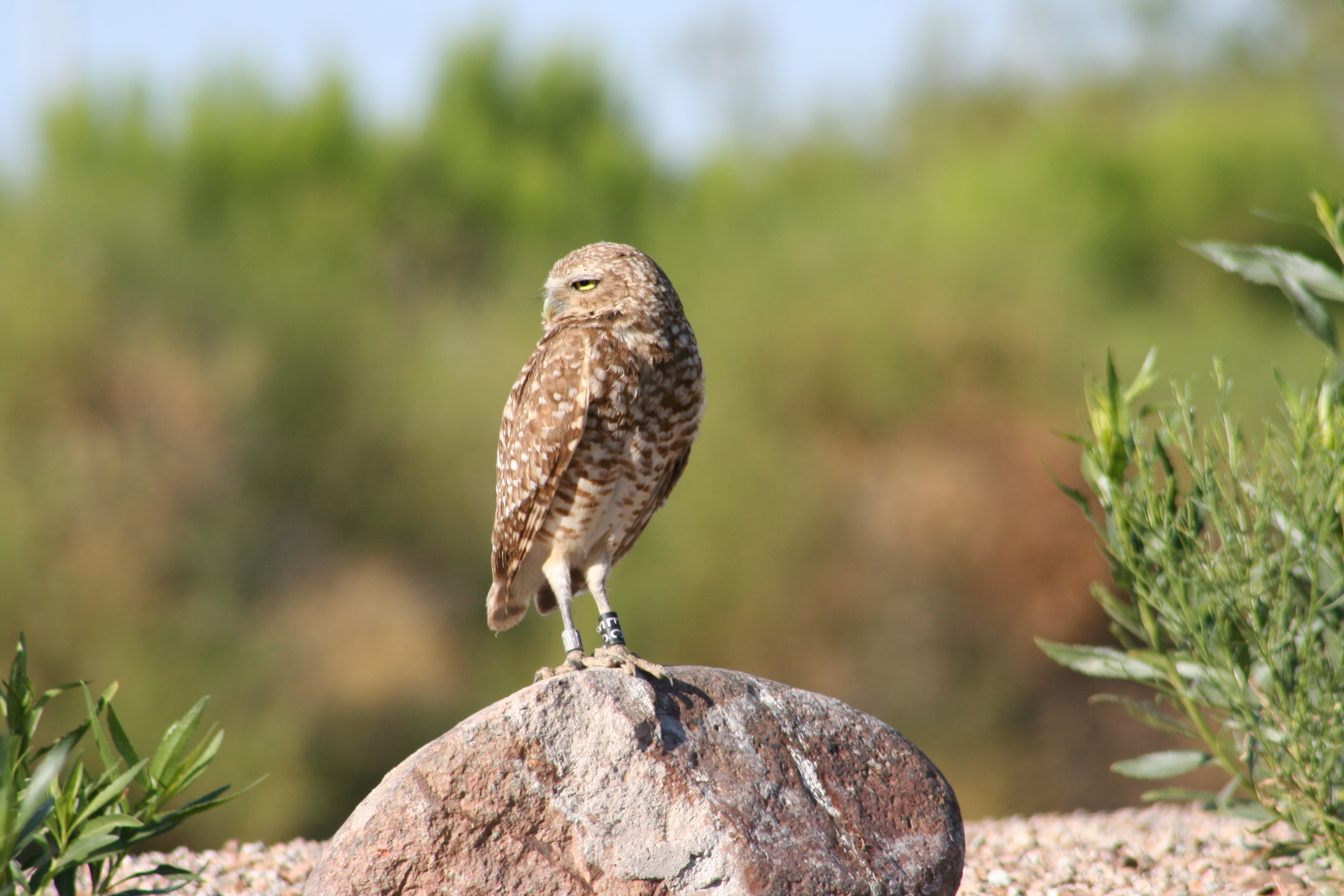
A burrowing owl on the lookout

When hunting, they wait on a perch until they spot prey. Then, they swoop down on prey or fly up to catch insects in flight. Sometimes, they chase prey on foot across the ground. The highly variable diet includes invertebrates and small vertebrates, which make up roughly one third and two thirds of the diet, respectively. Burrowing owls mainly eat large insects and small rodents. Although burrowing owls often live close to ground squirrels (Marmotini), they rarely prey upon them. They also hunt bats. An analysis of burrowing owl diets in the Dominican Republic found the owls consumed ~53% invertebrates, ~28% other birds, ~15% reptiles, ~3% amphibians, and 1% mammals.

Rodent prey is usually dominated by locally superabundant species, like the delicate vesper mouse (Calomys tener) in southern Brazil. Among squamates and amphibians, small lizards like the tropical house gecko (Hemidactylus mabouia), snakes, frogs, and toads predominate. Generally, most vertebrate prey is in the weight class of several grams per individual. The largest prey are usually birds, such as eared doves (Zenaida auriculata) which may weigh almost as much as a burrowing owl, as well as sparrows.

Regarding invertebrates, the burrowing owl seems less of a generalist. It is extremely fond of termites such as Termitidae, and Orthoptera such as Conocephalinae and Copiphorinae katydids, Jerusalem crickets (Stenopelmatidae), true crickets (Gryllidae) and grasshoppers. Bothynus and Dichotomius anaglypticus scarab beetles (Scarabaeidae) were eaten far more often than even closely related species by many burrowing owls across central São Paulo (Brazil). Similarly, it was noted that among scorpions Bothriuridae were much preferred, among spiders Lycosidae (wolf spiders), and among millipedes (Diplopoda) certain Diplocheta. Small ground beetles (Carabidae) are eaten in quantity, while larger ones are much less popular as burrowing owl food, perhaps due to the vigorous defense the large species can put up. Earthworms are also preyed upon. Burrowing owls are also known to place the fecal matter of large herbivorous mammals around the outside of their burrows to attract dung beetles, which are used to provide a steady source of food for the owls. Burrowing owls can also predate on invertebrates attracted to artificial night lighting.

Unlike other owls, they also eat fruits and seeds, especially the fruit of tasajillo (Cylindropuntia leptocaulis) and other prickly pear and cholla cacti. On Clarion Island, where mammalian prey is lacking, they feed essentially on crickets and prickly pear fruit, adding Clarión wrens (Troglodytes tanneri) and young Clarion mourning doves (Zenaida macroura clarionensis) on occasion.

== Status and conservation ==
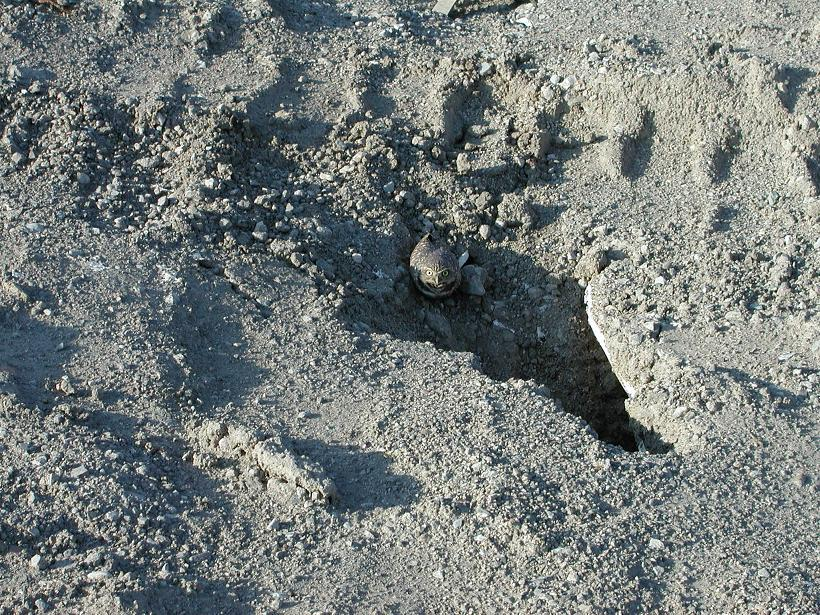
A burrowing owl makes a home out of a buried piece of pipe.

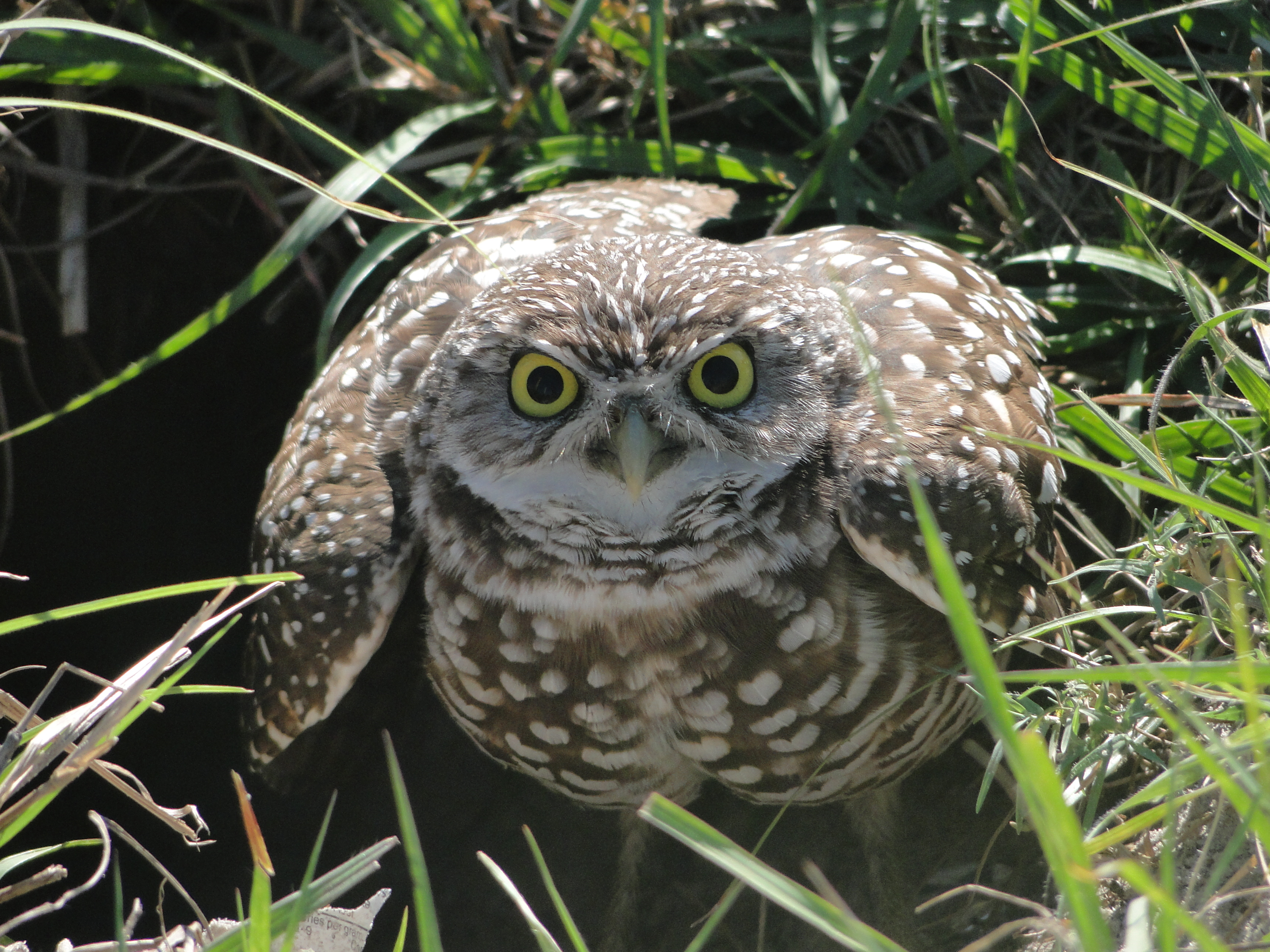
A. c. floridana by its burrow in Florida

The burrowing owl is endangered in Canada and threatened in Mexico. It is a state threatened species in Colorado and Florida and a California species of special concern. It is common and widespread in open regions of many Neotropical countries, where they sometimes even inhabit fields and parks in cities. In regions bordering the Amazon rainforest they are spreading with deforestation. It is therefore listed as Least Concern on the IUCN Red List. Burrowing owls are protected under the Migratory Bird Treaty Act in Canada, the United States, and Mexico. They are also included in CITES Appendix II. NatureServe lists the species as Apparently Secure.

=== California Endangered Species Act Listing Petition ===
In March 2024, Center for Biological Diversity, Urban Bird Foundation, Defenders of Wildlife, Burrowing Owl Preservation Society, Santa Clara Valley Audubon Society, Central Valley Bird Club and San Bernardino Valley Audubon Society submitted a California Endangered Species Act listing petition to the Fish and Game Commission to get protections for five populations of the western burrowing owl.

The petition requests endangered status for burrowing owls in southwestern California, central-western California and the San Francisco Bay Area, and threatened status for burrowing owls in the Central Valley and southern desert range.

=== Dependency on burrowing animals ===
The major reasons for declining populations in North America are loss of habitat, and control programs for prairie dogs. While some species of burrowing owl can dig their own burrows, most species rely on burrowing animals to burrow holes that the owls can use as shelter and nesting space. There is a high correlation between the location of burrowing animal colonies, like those of ground squirrels, with the presence of burrowing owls. Rates of burrowing owl decline have also been shown to correlate with prairie dog decline. Western burrowing owls, for example, nest in burrows made by black-tailed prairie dogs since they are unable to dig their own. However, prairie dog populations have experienced a decline, one of the causes of this being prairie dog eradication programs. When prairie dogs dig burrows, they can uproot plants in the process. This is most common in agricultural areas, where burrows cause damage to existing crops, creating a problem for local farmers. In Nebraska and Montana, eradication programs have already been put in place to manage the population of prairie dogs. Eradication programs for ground squirrels have also been put in place. In California, California ground squirrels have been known to feed on crop seedlings as well as grasses meant for cattle, which prevents crop growth and decreases food supply for cattle. However, as burrowing animal populations decrease, burrowing owls become more vulnerable to exposure to predators. With fewer burrows available, burrowing owl populations will be more concentrated, with more owls occupying fewer burrows . As a result, predators will more easily detect owl populations and be capable of eliminating larger broods of owls at once. Prairie dogs and ground squirrels also act as a buffer between owls and their predators, since they become the target prey rather than the owls. Another benefit prairie dogs in particular provide burrowing owls takes the form of their alarm calls, which alert burrowing owls if predators are nearby, therefore giving the owls ample time to hide or escape. Without burrowing animals, almost every aspect contributing to suitable and safe living for burrowing owls will no longer be available. Organizations have tried contributing to the conservation of burrowing owls by digging artificial burrows for these owls to occupy in areas with no active colony of burrowing animals. However, creating artificial burrows is not sustainable and is not effective as a long term solution.

=== Anthropogenic impacts ===
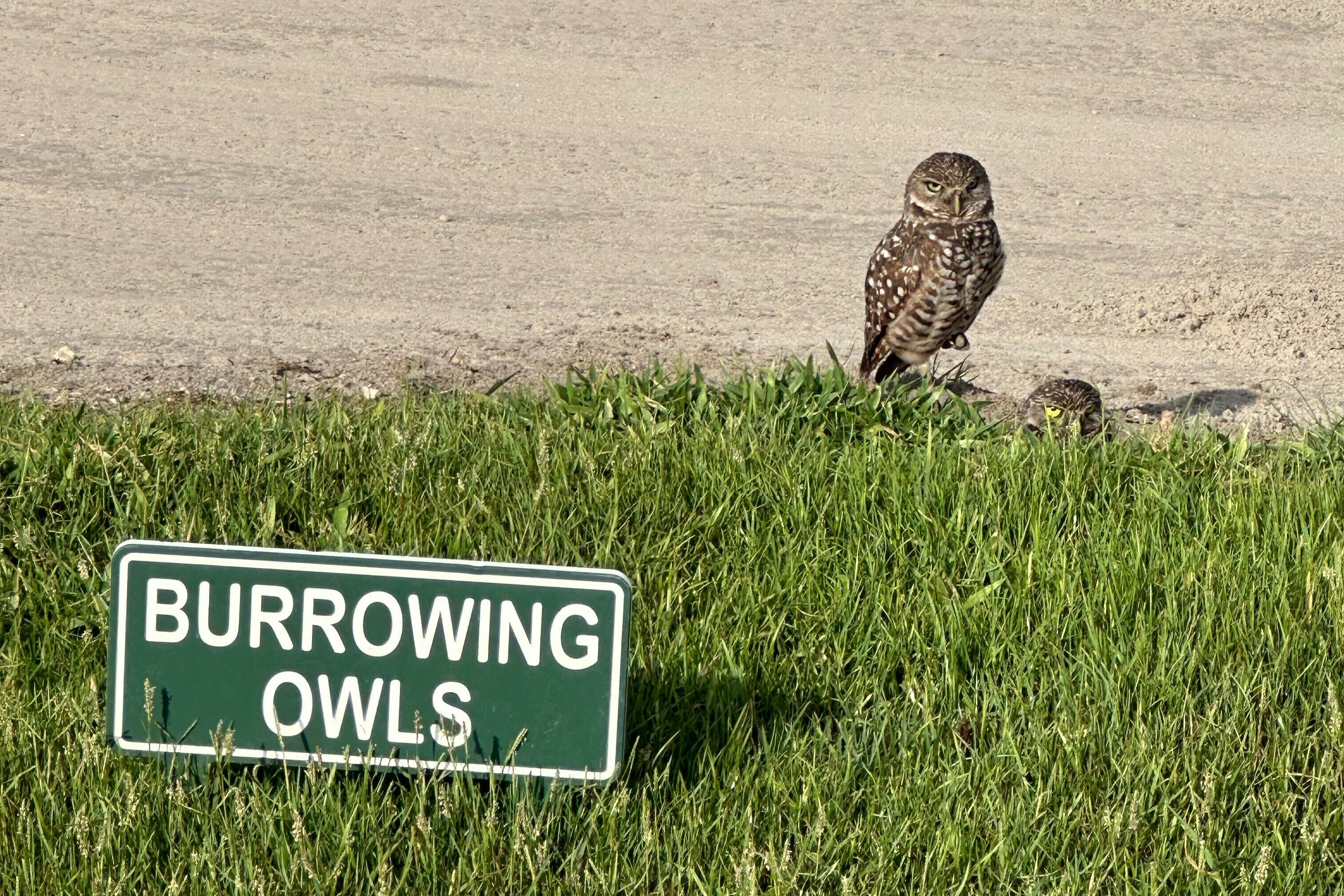
Burrowing owls at a golf course in Plantation, FL

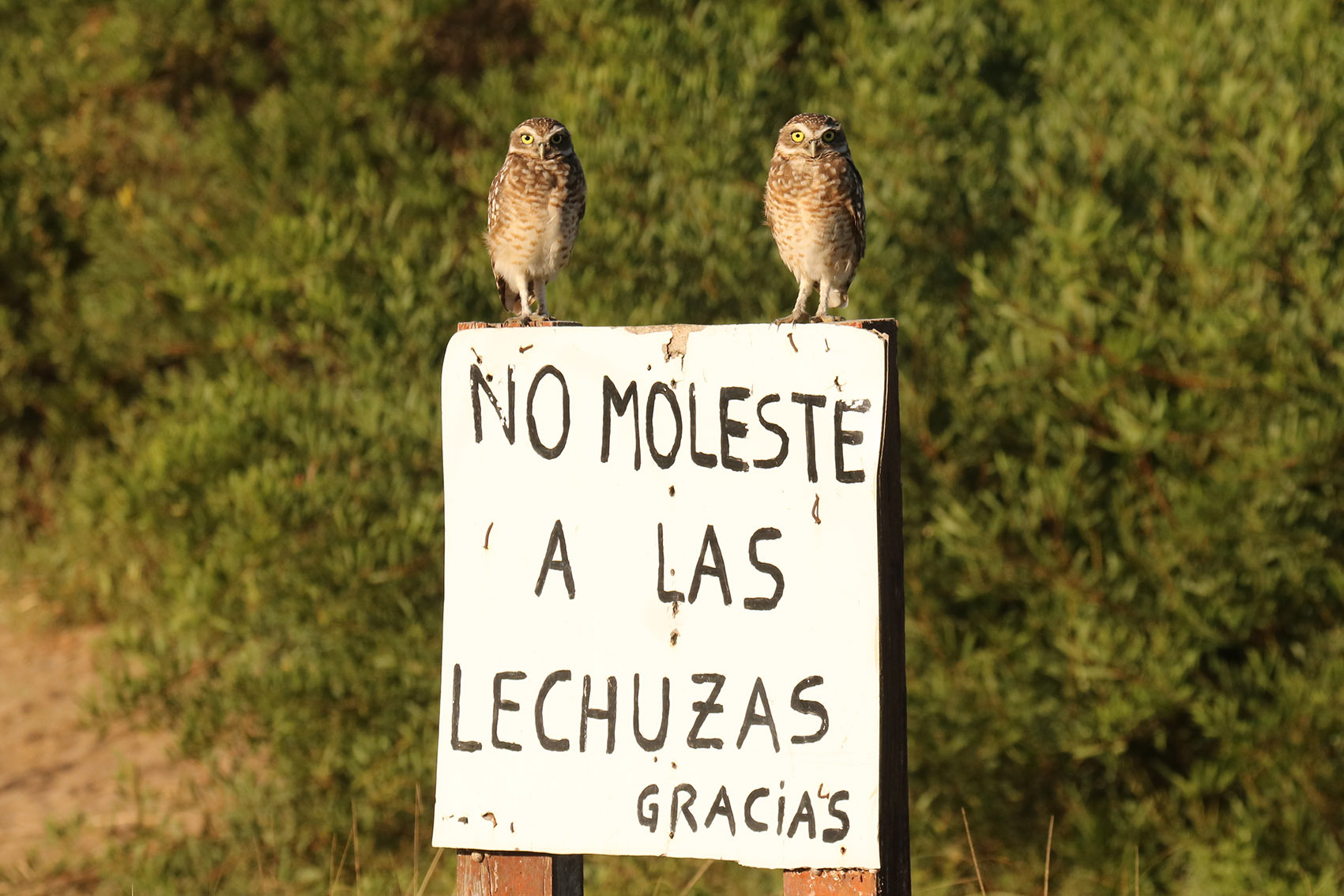
At Buenos Aires, Argentina. The sign reads, "Do not disturb the owls, thanks."

Burrowing owls readily inhabit some anthropogenic landscapes, such as airport grasslands or golf courses, and are known to take advantage of artificial nest sites (plastic burrows with tubing for the entrance) and perches. Burrowing owls have demonstrated similar reproductive success in rural grasslands and urban settings. The urban-residing burrowing owls have also developed the behavior of digging their own burrows and exhibit different fear responses to human and domestic dogs compared to their rural counterparts. Research has suggested that this species has made adaptations to the rapid urbanization of their usual habitat, and conservation efforts should be considered accordingly. Genetic analysis of the two North American subspecies indicates that inbreeding is not a problem within those populations.

In Florida specifically there is a rise of urban development which impacts the burrowing owl's populations. While burrowing owls can adapt to urban settings, the rapid change and construction causes issues including habitat destruction and car strikes. Studies have recently shown that in areas that have a lower adult survival rate, juvenile survival rates increase. This is due to increased nesting opportunities and is called compensatory demographic response. However groups like FAU and Project Perch have helped preserve the habitats in place and relocating the burrowing owls nearby if necessary.

=== Relocation ===
Where the presence of burrowing owls conflicts with development interests, a passive relocation technique has been applied successfully: rather than capturing the birds and transporting them to a new site (which may be stressful and prone to failure), the owls are half-coerced, half-enticed to move on their own accord. The preparations need to start several months prior to the anticipated disturbance with observing the owl colony and noting especially their local movements and site preferences. After choosing a location nearby that has suitable ground and provides good burrowing owl breeding habitat, this new site is enhanced by adding burrows, perches, etc. Once the owls have accustomed to the changes and are found to be interested in the location – if possible, this should be at the onset of spring, before the breeding season starts – they are prevented from entering the old burrows. A simple one-way trapdoor design has been described that is placed over the burrow for this purpose. If everything has been correctly prepared, the owl colony will move over to the new site in the course of a few nights at most. It will need to be monitored occasionally for the following months or until the major human construction nearby has ended.

Some organizations such as the Center for Biological Diversity and Urban Bird Foundation contend that the removal from their burrows, either through active or passive relocation, has been a factor in the extirpation of burrowing owl populations in California because of the species' high site fidelity.

== Predation ==
In Florida, burrowing owls may be eaten by some growth stage of invasive snakes such as Burmese pythons, reticulated pythons, Southern African rock pythons, Central African rock pythons, boa constrictors, yellow anacondas, Bolivian anacondas, dark-spotted anacondas, and green anacondas.
