= América Futebol Clube (Caaporã) =

América de Caaporã
- Full name: América Futebol Clube
- Nickname(s): Alviverde
- Founded: April 10, 1944 (80 years ago)
- Ground: Lundrigão, Caaporã, Paraíba state, Brazil
- Capacity: 3,000
Home colours	Away colours

América Futebol Clube, commonly known as América de Caaporã, is a Brazilian football club based in Caaporã, Paraíba state.

== History ==
The club was founded on November 19, 1944.

== Stadium ==
América Futebol Clube play their home games at Estádio Frederico Lundgren, nicknamed Lundrigão. The stadium has a maximum capacity of 3,000 people.
