= Pitimbu =

Coordinates: 7.47083°S 34.8089°W

- City of Pitimbu
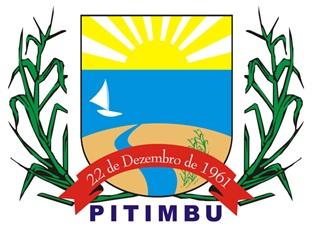
- Flag Coat of arms
- Nicknames: Pitbeach, Lobster Land, Land of Tranquility
- Motto: Pitimbu dos Olhares não te escondas
- Location in Paraíba
- Country: Brazil
- Region: Northeast
- State: Paraíba
- Mesoregion: Mata Paraibana
- Metropolitan Area: João Pessoa

Government
  - Mayor: Rômulo Carneiro Neto (PP)

Area
  - Total: 52.527 sq mi (136.045 km^{2})

Population (2020)
  - Total: 19,275
- Time zone: UTC−3 (BRT)
- Postal Code: 58324-000
- Area code: +55 83

Pitimbu is a city in the state of Paraíba (Brazil), located in the microregion of the South Coast and metropolitan area of João Pessoa. According to the IBGE (Brazilian Institute of Geography and Statistics), in 2020 its population was estimated at 19,275 inhabitants, 46% in urban areas. Its area is 136 km^{2} (53 sq mi) representing 0.241% of the state.

The municipality contains a small part of the 6,677-hectare (16,500-acre) Acaú-Goiana Extractive Reserve, a sustainable use conservation unit created in 2007.

== See also ==
- List of municipalities in Paraíba
