= Eastern Brazil marine ecoregion =

Tropical marine ecoregion

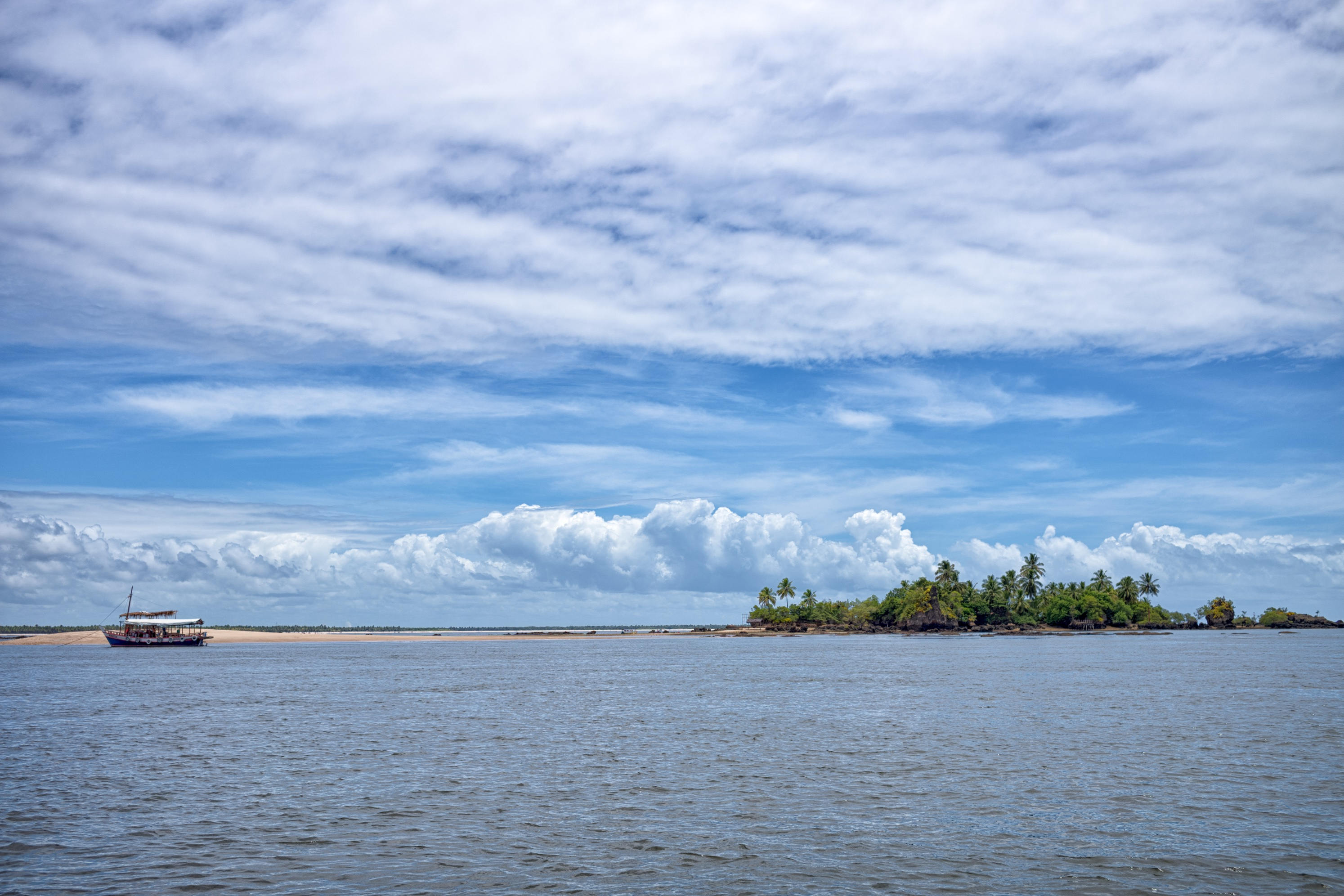
- Ilha da Pedra Furada

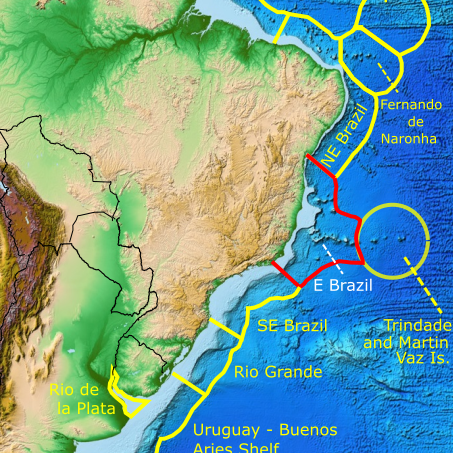
- Marine ecoregion boundaries (red line)

Ecology
- Realm: Tropical Atlantic
- Province: Tropical Southwestern Atlantic

Geography
- Country: Brazil
- Currents: Brazil Current

The Eastern Brazil marine ecoregion covers the coastal marine environment along the middle of the east coast of Brazil. The ecoregion extends south from the Bay of All Saints (about 15 degrees south latitude) to Cabo Frio (about 23 degrees south latitude) just east of the city of Rio de Janeiro. The Brazil Current enters from the east, feeding warm subtropical water to the south along the coast. The influence of the tropical waters leaves the ecoregion relatively oligotrophic (nutrient poor). The Eastern Brazil ecoregion is one of two coastal marine ecoregions (along with the Northeastern Brazil marine ecoregion) in the Tropical Southwest Atlantic marine province. It is thus part of the Tropical Atlantic realm. .

== Physical setting ==
The ecoregion reaches out into the Atlantic Ocean for 200–250 miles from the coast. The ecoregion is bounded on the north at the Bay of All Saints, and stretches for 1,000 coastal miles to the south at Cabo Frio, where the ecoregion transitions to the Southeastern Brazil marine ecoregion. The bordering coast is generally low and flat, and characterized by Bahia coastal forests ecoregion, and mangrove forests of the Bahia mangroves ecoregion. The major rivers feeding the Eastern Brazil marine region include the Jequitinhonha, Doce and Paraíba do Sul rivers.

The continental shelf along this coast of Brazil extends about 30 miles out to sea in the north and south, but 130 miles in the middle. The deepest point in the ecoregion overall is −3,264 metres (−10,709 ft), and the average is 113 metres (371 ft).

A prominent underwater feature in the middle of the ecoregion is the Albrohos Shelf, a portion of the continental shelf extending 200 km offshore. Besides supporting extensive coral reef complexes, the Albrohos shelf includes the largest known continuous rhodolith bed in the world, with an estimated area of 20,900 km2. Rhodoliths are calcareous nodules created by Coralline algae, and support diverse benthic communities in a manner similar to shallow coral reefs.

Another prominent underwater feature is the east–west trending Vitória-Trindade Seamount Chain (VTC). The seamounts in the ecoregion are known to support high biodiversity in fish species, but are relatively under-explored. The offshore basins of the ecoregion, from north to south, are the Camamu-Almada Basin, the Jequitinhonha Basin, the Cumuruxatiba Basin, the Mucuri Basin, and the Espirito Santo Basin. Oil and gas exploration and production are underway in the northern two basins.

== Currents and climate ==
The Atlantic South Equatorial Current (SEC) flows directly into the ecoregion from the East, bringing warm water from the South Atlantic Ocean. As the SEC approaches the eastern point of Brazil at Cape São Roque, it splits, with the North Brazil Current (NBC) flowing along the coast to the north and west, and the Brazil Current flowing south along the eastern coast. The Brazil Current is a western boundary current, flowing at a rate averaging 4 Sverdrups (Sv), at a mean speed of 60–100 centimetres per second (1.3–2.2 mph). Surface temperatures range from 22–28.5 °C (71.6–83.3 °F).

== Animals / Fish ==
Biodiversity of the near-shore areas varies with the influence of the coasts - mangroves, sandbanks, and beaches - and also by the nature of the bottoms, which are reefs, gravel and mud. There are a variety of fish, cetaceans, turtles, shrimps and lobsters. A recent study found 25 species of shark and 9 species of rays.

Over 90% of commercial fishing is on the nearshore coast, typically by artisinal (subsistence and traditional) methods. Traditional methods of hook and line fishing, and with gillnets, are employed on small boats seeking drum fish (family Sciaenidae). Small shrimp trawlers and lobster boats also operate in the coastal waters, with some evidence that use of nets by lobster fishers is causing harm to the bottom for other species. In the south, along Rio de Janeiro state, the artisinal beach fishery uses large canoes and seine nets to catch migrating schools of bluefish, mullets and bonitos.

Offshore, the industrial fisheries of the region are mostly employ hook-and-line methods rather than trawlers due to the narrow coastal shelf, rocky bottom, and deep canyons. The commercial fishery is centered on rockfish, sharks and tuna.

== Conservation status ==
Many of the terrestrial protected areas on the coast have marine components, such that about 8% of the ecoregion is protected, including:

- Comboios Biological Reserve. A coastal preserve for sea turtle nesting sites.

As of 2013, only 2% of the Albrohos Shelf, with its Mesophotic coral reefs, was in a "no-take" protected area.
