= Acaú-Goiana Extractive Reserve =

Nature reserve in Brazil

- Reserva Extrativista Acaú-Goiana
- IUCN category VI (protected area with sustainable use of natural resources)
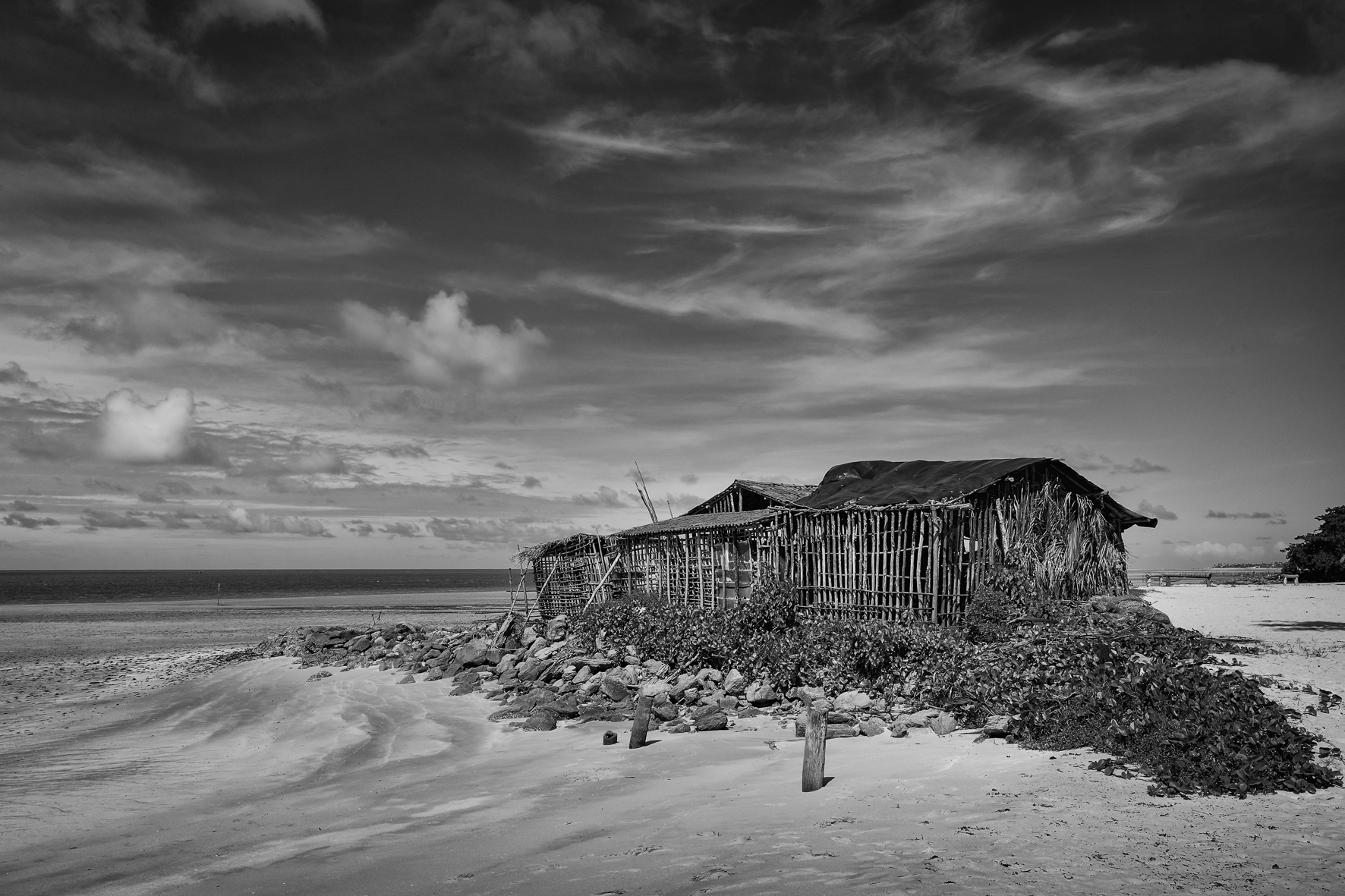

- Location within Brazil
- Nearest city: Goiana, Pernambuco
- Coordinates: 7.547°S 34.904°W
- Area: 6,676.69 hectares (16,498.5 acres)
- Designation: Extractive reserve
- Created: 26 September 2007
- Administrator: Chico Mendes Institute for Biodiversity Conservation

The Acaú-Goiana Extractive Reserve (Portuguese: Reserva Extrativista Acaú-Goiana) is an extractive reserve in the states of Paraíba and Pernambuco, Brazil.

== Location ==
The Acaú-Goiana Extractive Reserve covers 6,676.69 hectares (16,498.5 acres). It is in the municipalities of Caaporã (5.07%) and Pitimbu (1.16%) in Paraíba and Goiana (62.08%) in Pernambuco. The reserve is in the coastal marine biome. It includes the estuary of the Tracunhaém River. Annual rainfall is 400 millimetres (16 in). Temperatures range from 20 to 30 °C (68 to 86 °F) with an average of 25 °C (77 °F). Vegetation includes mangroves, restinga and a small strip of Atlantic Forest.

== Administration ==
The Acaú-Goiana Extractive Reserve was created by federal decree on 26 September 2007, and is administered by the Chico Mendes Institute for Biodiversity Conservation. It is classed as IUCN protected area category VI (protected area with sustainable use of natural resources). The extractive reserve aims to protect the livelihoods and ensure use and conservation of natural resources traditionally used by the communities of Carne de Vaca, Povoação de São Lourenço, Tejucupapo, Baldo do Rio Goiana, Acaú, and other communities in the reserve. On 10 November 2009 the Instituto Nacional de Colonização e Reforma Agrária (INCRA: National Institute for Colonization and Agrarian Reform) recognised the reserve as meeting the needs of 1,510 families. A deliberative council was created on 24 October 2012.

== Sources ==
- Resex Acaú-Goiana (in Portuguese), Chico Mendes Institute for Biodiversity Conservation
- RESEX Acaú-Goiana (in Portuguese), ISA: Instituto Socioambiental
- Unidade de Conservação: Reserva Extrativista Acaú-Goiana (in Portuguese), MMA: Ministério do Meio Ambiente
