= América Futebol Clube (AL) =

América
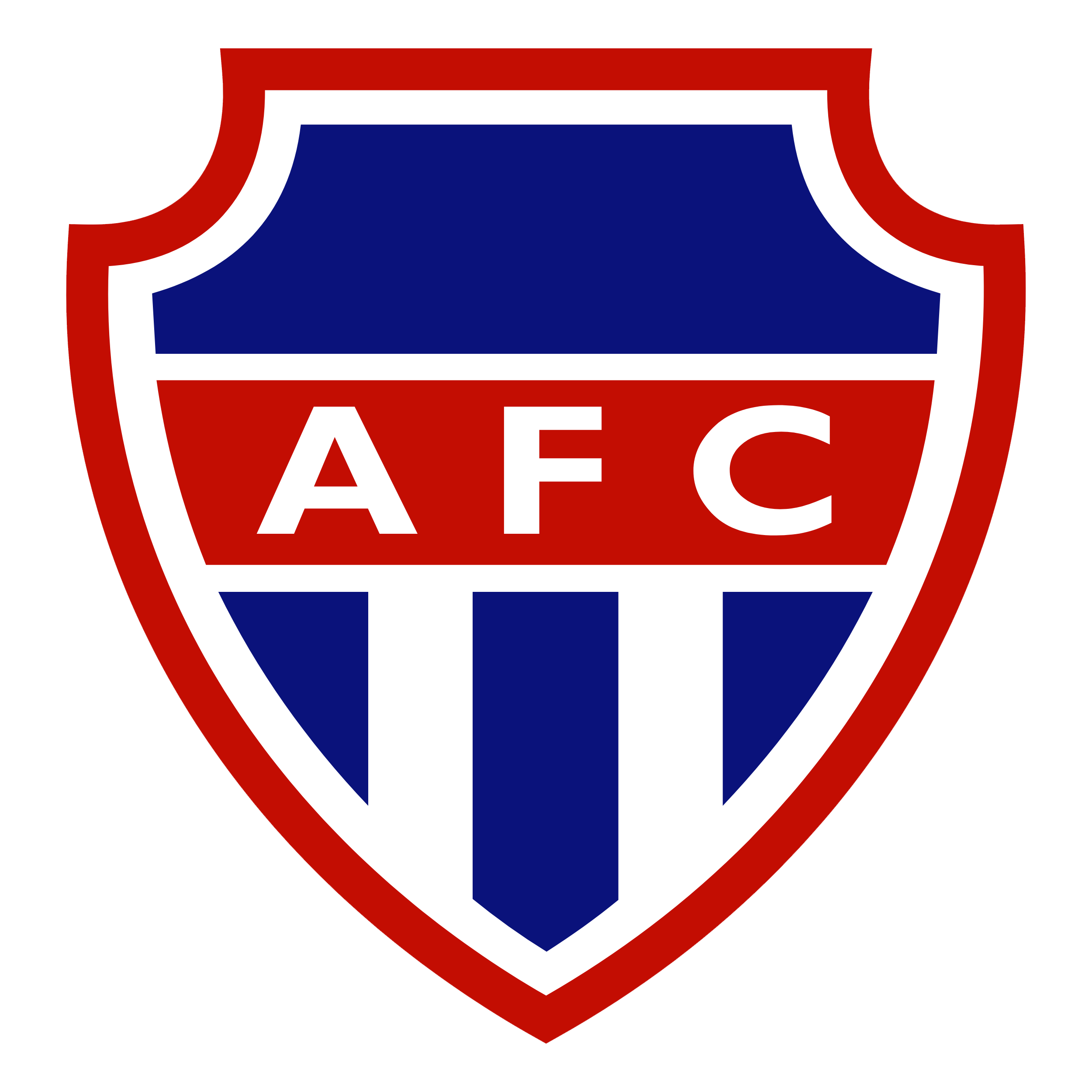
- Full name: América Futebol Clube
- Founded: 8 June 1952 (72 years ago)
- Ground: Eduardão
- Capacity: 1,000
- 2005: Alagoano 2ª Divisão, 10th of 10
| Home colours | Away colours |

América Futebol Clube, commonly known as América Alagoano or América-AL, was a Brazilian football club based in São Luís do Quitunde, Alagoas. The team last participated in the Campeonato Alagoano Segunda Divisão in the 2005 season.

== History ==
The club was founded on 8 June 1952.

== Stadium ==
América Futebol Clube play their home games at Estádio Municipal Eduardo de Melo Gonçalves, nicknamed Eduardão. The stadium has a maximum capacity of 1,000 people.
