= Tracunhaém River =

- Location within Brazil
- Native name: Rio Tracunhaém (Portuguese)

Location
- Country: Brazil

Physical characteristics
- Source
  - location: Pernambuco state
- Mouth
  - location: Pontinhas, Pitimbu, Paraíba
  - coordinates: 7.549863°S 34.833438°W

The Tracunhaém River is a river of Pernambuco state in eastern Brazil.

Its estuary on the Atlantic Ocean lies in the 6,677 hectares (16,500 acres) Acaú-Goiana Extractive Reserve, a sustainable use conservation unit created in 2007.

== See also ==
- List of rivers of Pernambuco
