= Mamanguape River =

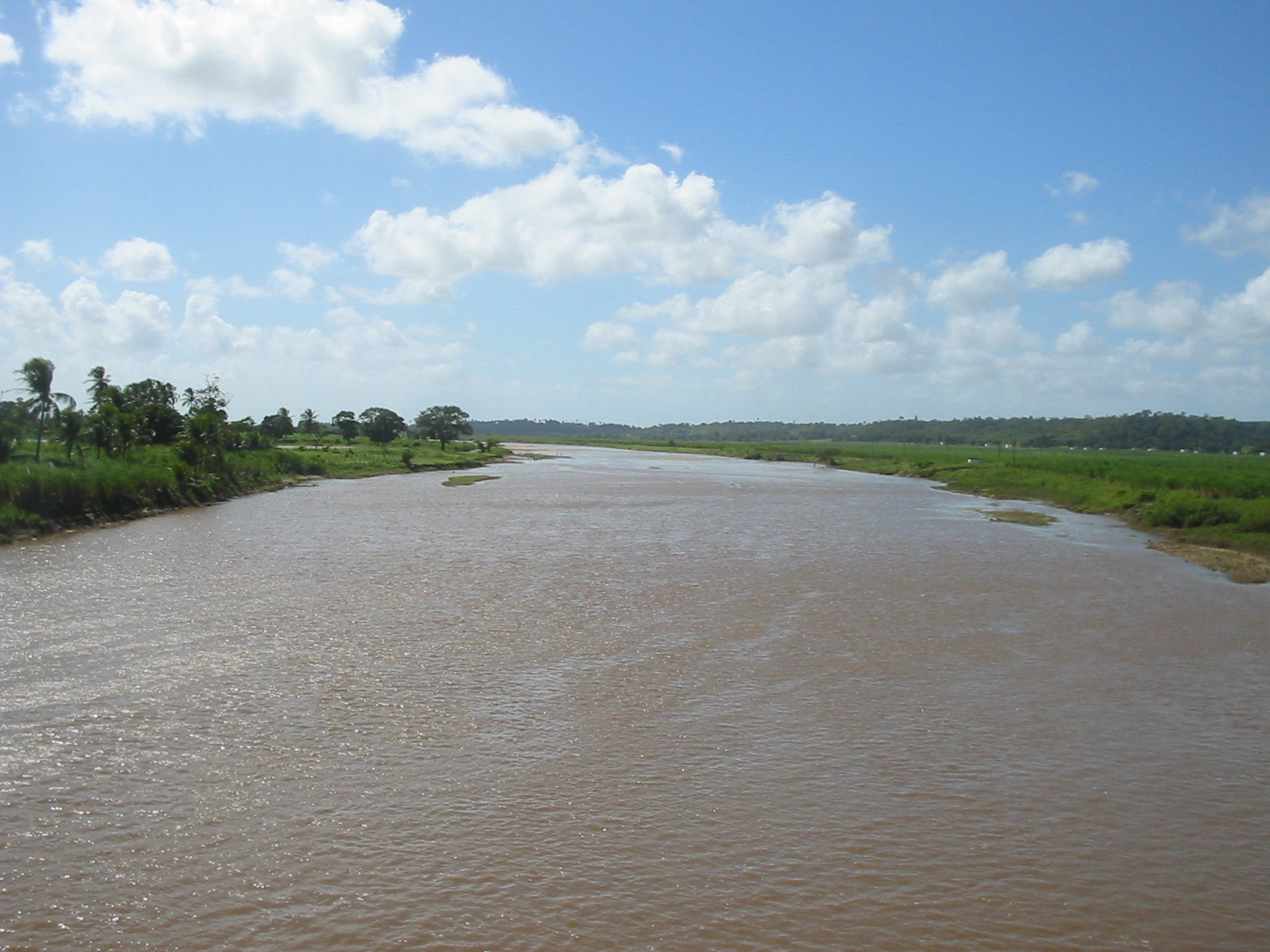

- Location within Brazil
- Native name: Rio Mamanguape (Portuguese)

Location
- Country: Brazil

Physical characteristics
- Source
  - location: Paraíba state
- Mouth
  - location: Atlantic ocean
  - coordinates: 6.768056°S 34.927778°W

The Mamanguape River is a river in the Paraíba state, Northeastern Brazil.

Part of the river basin is in the 4,052 hectares (10,010 acres) Guaribas Biological Reserve, a fully protected conservation unit created in 1990.

== See also ==
- List of rivers of Paraíba
