= Caaporã =

Coordinates: 7°31′S 34°54′W

- Municipality
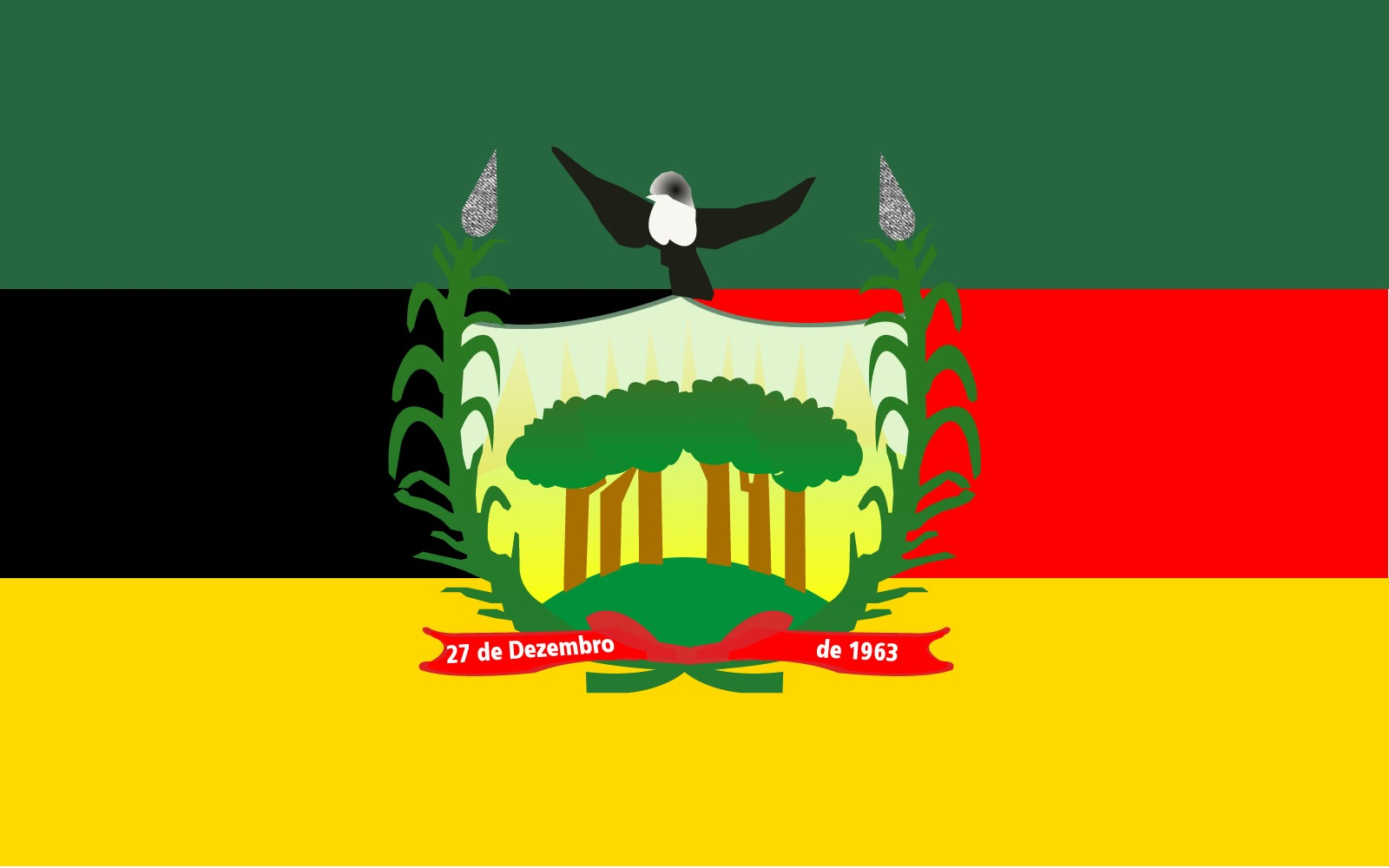
- Flag Coat of arms

- Location in Paraíba
- Country: Brazil
- Region: South
- State: Paraíba
- Mesoregion: Mata Paraibana

Population (2020)
  - Total: 21,955
- Time zone: UTC−3 (BRT)

Caaporã is a municipality in the state of Paraíba in the Northeast Region of Brazil.

The municipality contains a small part of the 6,677-hectare (16,500-acre) Acaú-Goiana Extractive Reserve, a sustainable use conservation unit created in 2007.

== See also ==
- List of municipalities in Paraíba
