= Atlantic semi-deciduous forests =

Ecoregion in Brazil

The Atlantic semi-deciduous forests, also known as the Atlantic interior forests, are a belt of tropical moist broadleaf forests that are part of the Atlantic Forests complex of eastern Brazil. The semi-deciduous forests form a transitional zone between the humid Atlantic moist forests which lie near the Atlantic coast, and the drier Caatinga shrublands, Atlantic dry forests, and Cerrado savannas of the interior.

The World Wildlife Fund divides the semi-deciduous forests into three distinct ecoregions. The Pernambuco interior forests lie west of the Pernambuco coastal forests in Rio Grande do Norte, Paraíba, Pernambuco, Alagoas, and Sergipe states. The Bahia interior forests lie west of the Bahia coastal forests in Bahia, Minas Gerais, and Espírito Santo states. The Alto Paraná Atlantic forests lie inland from the Serra do Mar coastal forests, extending inland across the Brazilian states of Rio de Janeiro, Minas Gerais, São Paulo, Goiás, Mato Grosso do Sul, Paraná, Santa Catarina, and Rio Grande do Sul, the Argentinian province of Misiones, and eastern Paraguay.
