= List of ecoregions in Brazil =

The following is a list of ecoregions in Brazil as identified by the World Wide Fund for Nature (WWF).

== Terrestrial ecoregions ==
=== by major habitat type ===
==== Tropical and subtropical moist broadleaf forests ====
- Alto Paraná Atlantic forests (Argentina, Brazil, Paraguay)
- Araucaria moist forests (Argentina, Brazil)
- Atlantic Coast restingas (Brazil)
- Bahia coastal forests (Brazil)
- Bahia interior forests (Brazil)
- Caatinga Enclaves moist forests (Brazil)
- Fernando de Noronha-Atol das Rocas moist forests (Brazil)
- Guayanan Highlands moist forests (Brazil, Colombia, Guyana, Suriname, Venezuela)
- Guianan moist forests (Brazil, French Guiana, Guyana, Suriname, Venezuela)
- Guianan piedmont and lowland moist forests (Brazil, Venezuela)
- Gurupá várzea (Brazil)
- Iquitos várzea (Bolivia, Brazil, Peru)
- Japurá–Solimões–Negro moist forests (Brazil, Colombia, Venezuela)
- Juruá–Purus moist forests (Brazil)
- Madeira–Tapajós moist forests (Bolivia, Brazil)
- Marajó várzea (Brazil)
- Maranhão Babaçu forests (Brazil)
- Mato Grosso tropical dry forests (Brazil, Bolivia)
- Monte Alegre várzea (Brazil)
- Negro–Branco moist forests (Brazil, Colombia, Venezuela)
- Northeastern Brazil restingas (Brazil)
- Pernambuco coastal forests (Brazil)
- Pernambuco interior forests (Brazil)
- Purus várzea (Brazil)
- Purus–Madeira moist forests (Brazil)
- Serra do Mar coastal forests (Brazil)
- Solimões–Japurá moist forests (Brazil, Colombia, Peru)
- Southwest Amazon moist forests (Bolivia, Brazil, Peru)
- Tapajós–Xingu moist forests (Brazil)
- Tepuis (Brazil, Guyana, Suriname, Venezuela)
- Tocantins–Araguaia–Maranhão moist forests (Brazil)
- Uatuma–Trombetas moist forests (Brazil, Guyana, Suriname)
- Xingu–Tocantins–Araguaia moist forests (Brazil)

==== Tropical and subtropical dry broadleaf forests ====
- Atlantic dry forests (Brazil)
- Chiquitano dry forests (Bolivia, Brazil)

==== Tropical and subtropical grasslands, savannas, and shrublands ====
- Campos rupestres (Brazil)
- Cerrado (Bolivia, Brazil, Paraguay)
- Guianan savanna (Brazil, Guyana, Venezuela)
- Humid Chaco (Argentina, Brazil, Bolivia, Paraguay)
- Uruguayan savanna (Argentina, Brazil, Uruguay)

==== Flooded grasslands and savannas ====
- Pantanal (Bolivia, Brazil, Paraguay)

==== Deserts and xeric shrublands ====
- Caatinga (Brazil)
- Saint Peter and Saint Paul rocks (Brazil)

==== Mangrove ====
- Amapá mangroves (Brazil)
- Bahia mangroves (Brazil)
- Ilha Grande mangroves (Brazil)
- Pará mangroves (Brazil)
- Rio Piranhas mangroves (Brazil)
- Rio São Francisco mangroves (Brazil)

=== by bioregion ===
==== Orinoco bioregion ====
===== Tropical and subtropical moist broadleaf forests =====
- Guayanan Highlands moist forests (Brazil, Colombia, Guyana, Suriname, Venezuela)

==== Amazonia bioregion ====
===== Tropical and subtropical moist broadleaf forests =====
- Caquetá moist forests (Brazil, Colombia)
- Guianan moist forests (Brazil, French Guiana, Guyana, Suriname, Venezuela)
- Gurupa várzea (Brazil)
- Iquitos várzea (Bolivia, Brazil, Peru)
- Japurá–Solimões–Negro moist forests (Brazil, Colombia, Venezuela)
- Juruá–Purus moist forests (Brazil)
- Madeira–Tapajós moist forests (Bolivia, Brazil)
- Marajó várzea (Brazil)
- Maranhão Babaçu forests (Brazil)
- Mato Grosso tropical dry forests (Brazil, Bolivia)
- Monte Alegre várzea (Brazil)
- Negro–Branco moist forests (Brazil, Colombia, Venezuela)
- Purus varzea (Brazil)
- Purus–Madeira moist forests (Brazil, Bolivia)
- Rio Negro campinarana (Brazil, Colombia)
- Solimões–Japurá moist forests (Brazil, Colombia, Peru)
- Southwest Amazon moist forests (Bolivia, Brazil, Peru)
- Tapajós–Xingu moist forests (Brazil)
- Tocantins–Araguaia–Maranhão moist forests (Brazil)
- Uatuma–Trombetas moist forests (Brazil, Guyana, Suriname)
- Xingu–Tocantins–Araguaia moist forests (Brazil)

===== Tropical and subtropical dry broadleaf forests =====
- Chiquitano dry forests (Bolivia, Brazil)

===== Tropical and subtropical grasslands, savannas, and shrublands =====
- Beni savanna (Bolivia, Brazil, Peru)
- Guianan savanna (Brazil, Guyana, Venezuela)

==== Eastern South America bioregion ====
===== Tropical and subtropical moist broadleaf forests =====
- Alto Paraná Atlantic forests (Argentina, Brazil, Paraguay)
- Araucaria moist forests (Argentina, Brazil)
- Atlantic Coast restingas (Brazil)
- Bahia coastal forests (Brazil)
- Bahia interior forests (Brazil)
- Caatinga enclaves moist forests (Brazil)
- Fernando de Noronha-Atol das Rocas moist forests (Brazil)
- Northeastern Brazil restingas (Brazil)
- Pernambuco coastal forests (Brazil)
- Pernambuco interior forests (Brazil)
- Serra do Mar coastal forests (Brazil)
- Trindade-Martin Vaz Islands tropical forests (Brazil)

===== Tropical and subtropical dry broadleaf forests =====
- Atlantic dry forests (Brazil)

===== Flooded grasslands and savannas =====
- Pantanal (Bolivia, Brazil, Paraguay)

===== Tropical and subtropical grasslands, savannas, and shrublands =====
- Campos rupestres (Brazil)
- Cerrado (Bolivia, Brazil, Paraguay)
- Humid Chaco (Argentina, Brazil, Bolivia, Paraguay)

===== Deserts and xeric shrublands =====
- Caatinga (Brazil)
- Saint Peter and Saint Paul rocks (Brazil)

==== Southern South America bioregion ====
===== Tropical and subtropical grasslands, savannas, and shrublands =====
- Uruguayan savanna (Argentina, Brazil, Uruguay)

==== Mangroves ====
by mangrove complex

===== Amazon-Orinoco-Maranhão complex =====
- Amapá mangroves (Brazil)
- Guianan mangroves (French Guiana, Guyana, Suriname, Venezuela, Brazil)
- Maranhão mangroves (Brazil)
- Pará mangroves (Brazil)

===== Northeast Brazil complex =====
- Bahia mangroves (Brazil)
- Rio Piranhas mangroves (Brazil)
- Rio São Francisco mangroves (Brazil)

===== Southeast Brazil complex =====
- Ilha Grande mangroves (Brazil)

== Freshwater ecoregions ==
=== by freshwater complex ===
==== Guiana/Orinoco Complex ====
- Eastern Morichal (Venezuela)
- Orinoco Delta (Venezuela)
- Southern Orinoco (Venezuela)
- Guiana Watershed (Brazil, French Guiana, Guyana, Suriname, Venezuela)

==== Amazon Complex ====
- Amazon Delta (Brazil)
- Amazon Main Channel (Brazil, Peru)
- Northern Amazon Shield Tributaries (Brazil)
- Rio Negro (Brazil, Colombia, Venezuela)
- Upper Amazon Piedmont (Bolivia, Colombia, Ecuador, Peru)
- Western Amazon Lowlands (Bolivia, Brazil, Peru)
- Central Brazilian Shield Tributaries (Bolivia, Brazil)
- Tocantins-Araguaia (Brazil)

==== Northeast Atlantic Complex ====
- Maranhão (Brazil)

==== Mata-Atlantica Complex ====
- Northeast Mata-Atlantica (Brazil)
- East Mata-Atlantica (Brazil)
- Southeast Mata-Atlantica (Brazil)

==== São Francisco Complex ====
- Caatinga (Brazil)
- Cerrado (Brazil)

==== Upper Parana Complex ====
- Alto Paraná Atlantic forests (Brazil)

==== Beni Savanna (Llanos de Moxos) Complex ====
- Llanos de Moxos (Bolivia, Brazil)

==== Paraguay-Parana Complex ====
- Pantanal (Bolivia, Brazil, Paraguay)
- Lower Parana (Argentina, Brazil, Paraguay, Uruguay)

==== Southern Atlantic Complex ====
- Jacui Highlands (Brazil, Uruguay)
- Lagoa dos Patos Coastal Plain (Brazil, Uruguay)

== Marine ecoregions ==
by marine realm and marine province

=== Tropical Atlantic ===
==== North Brazil Shelf ====
- Guianan marine ecoregion
- Amazonia

==== Tropical Southwestern Atlantic ====
- Sao Pedro and Sao Paulo Islands
- Fernando de Noronha and Atol das Rocas
- Northeastern Brazil marine ecoregion
- Eastern Brazil marine ecoregion
- Trindade and Martin Vaz Islands

=== Temperate South America ===
==== Warm Temperate Southwestern Atlantic ====
- Southeastern Brazil
- Rio Grande

== See also ==
- Protected areas of Brazil
- Lista de espécies da flora do Brasil
- Biomes in Brazil
- List of Atlantic Forest conservation units
- List of state parks in São Paulo
