= Northeastern Brazil restingas =

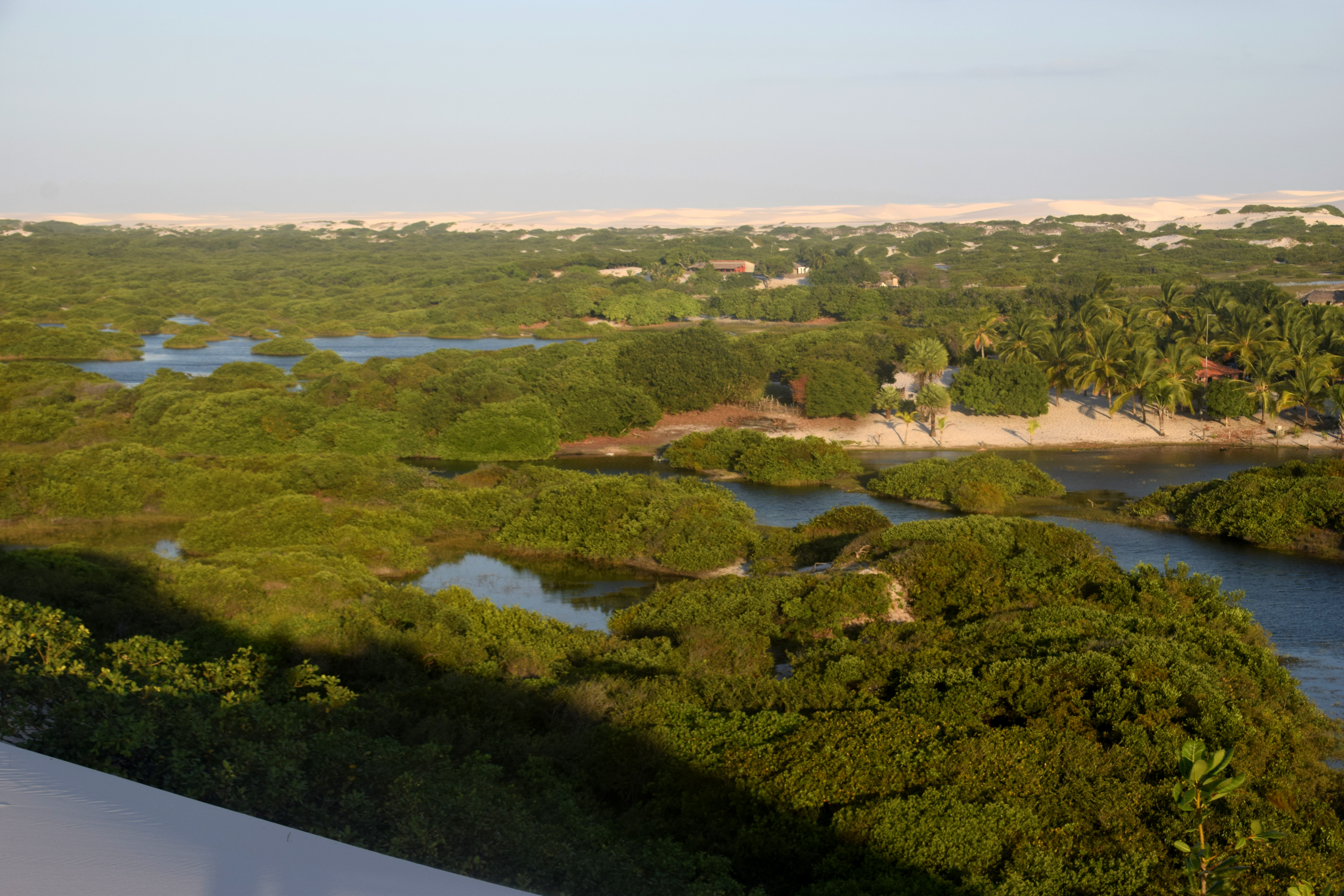
- Restingas in Lençóis Maranhenses National Park, Maranhão

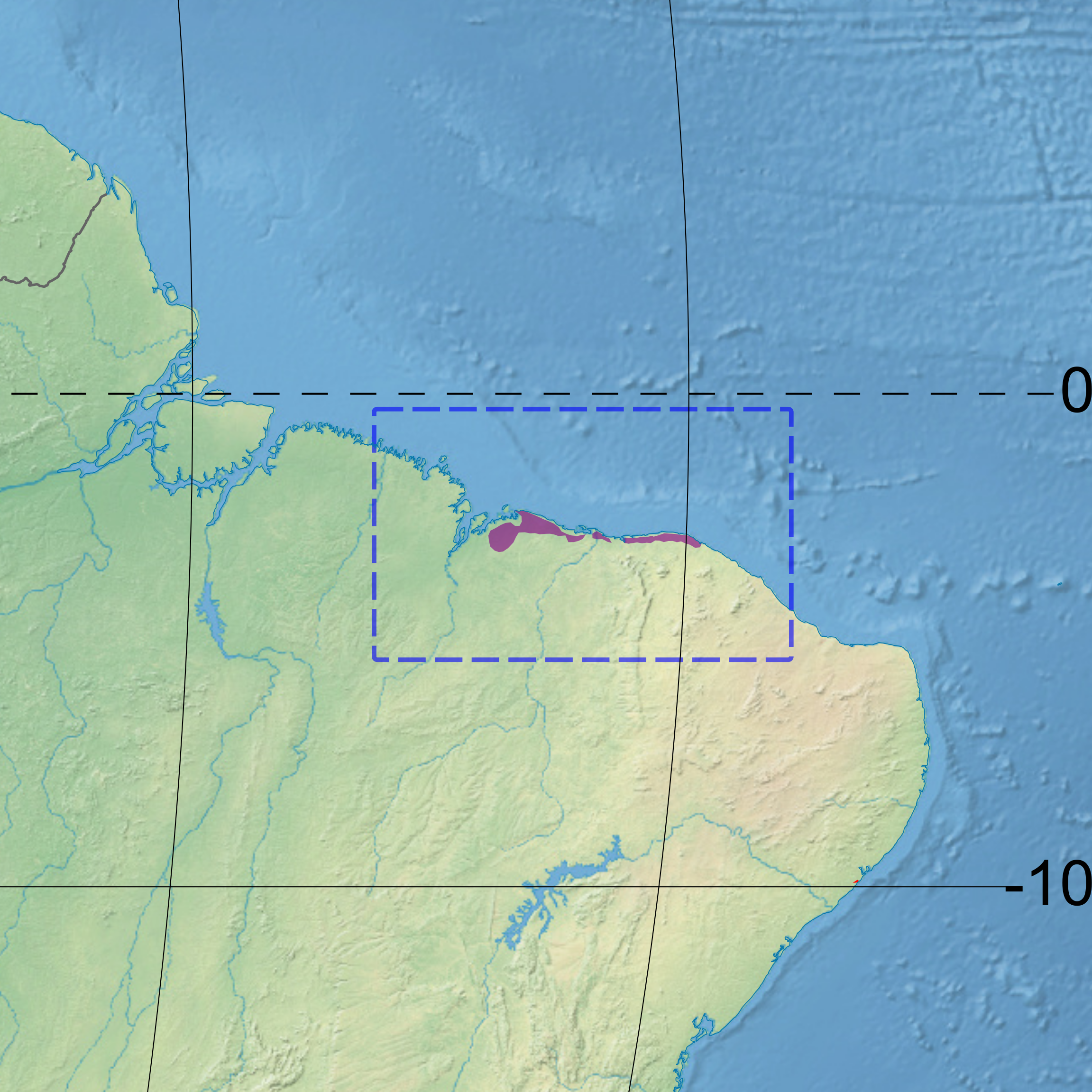
- Ecoregion territory (in purple)

Ecology
- Realm: Neotropical
- Biome: tropical and subtropical moist broadleaf forests
- Borders: Amazon-Orinoco-Southern Caribbean mangroves; Maranhão Babaçu forests, Caatinga

Geography
- Area: 9,709 km^{2} (3,749 mi^{2})
- Countries: Brazil
- States: Maranhão; Piauí, Ceará
- Coordinates: 2.5°S 43°W

Conservation
- Conservation status: Critical/endangered
- Protected: 6,953 km² (72%)

The Northeastern Brazil restingas are an ecoregion of northeastern Brazil. Restingas are coastal forests which form along coastal sand dunes in Brazil. The soils are typically sandy, acidic, and nutrient-poor, and are characterized by medium-sized trees and shrubs adapted to local conditions. Restingas have aspects of mangroves, caatingas, wetlands, and moist forests, often forming along wind-driven sand dunes. The Northeast Brazil restingas are the most northerly of the forest type in Brazil.

== Location and description ==
The ecoregion extends 400 km along the northeast Atlantic coast of Brazil, and up to 100 km inland. This covers an area of 9,709 square kilometers (3,749 sq mi) along oasts of eastern Maranhão, Piauí, and western Ceará states. The ecoregion includes the Lençóis Maranhenses National Park, where patches of restinga are interspersed with some of the most extensive coastal dunes in the world. The dune systems reflect the forces of tides that vary 6 meters.

== Climate ==
The climate of the ecoregion is Tropical savanna climate - dry summer (Köppen climate classification (As)). This climate is characterized by relatively even temperatures throughout the year, and a pronounced dry season. The driest month has less than 60 mm of precipitation, and is drier than the average month.

== Flora and fauna ==
The area is a patchwork of habitat types. Herbaceous cover constitutes 29% of the area, including beach morning glory (Ipomoea imperati), seashore dropseed, and Iresine as pioneer species on the dunes of the northwest. Sedge and panic grass are found on the floodplains. Shrub takes up another 20%, dominating in the caatingas of the drier eastern portions of the ecoregion. Forests are 34% of the cover, split roughly equally between open and closed canopy. The moist forests are found along the inland edge and in the southwest. The flora of the Northeastern Brazil restingas includes many species with affinities to the Amazon biome, which distinguishes them from the Atlantic Coast restingas of Brazil's eastern coast, whose flora is mostly derived from the Atlantic Forest of eastern Brazil.

The Scarlet ibis is a well-known feature of the inter-dune lakes and wetlands of this area. Recent conservation efforts have also focused on protecting the nesting sites of sea turtles.

== Protected areas ==
Over 29% of the ecoregion is located in an officially protected area, including:

- Lençóis Maranhenses National Park, at the western edge of the ecoregion, at the Baía de São José
