= Bahia mangroves =

Mangrove ecoregion in northeastern Brazil

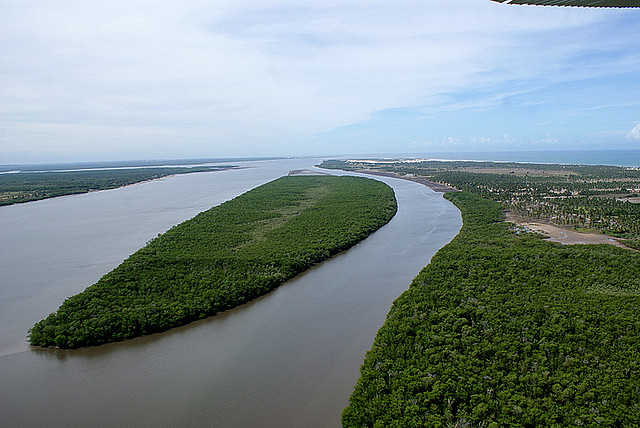
- A mangrove forest of Mangue Seco, Bahia.

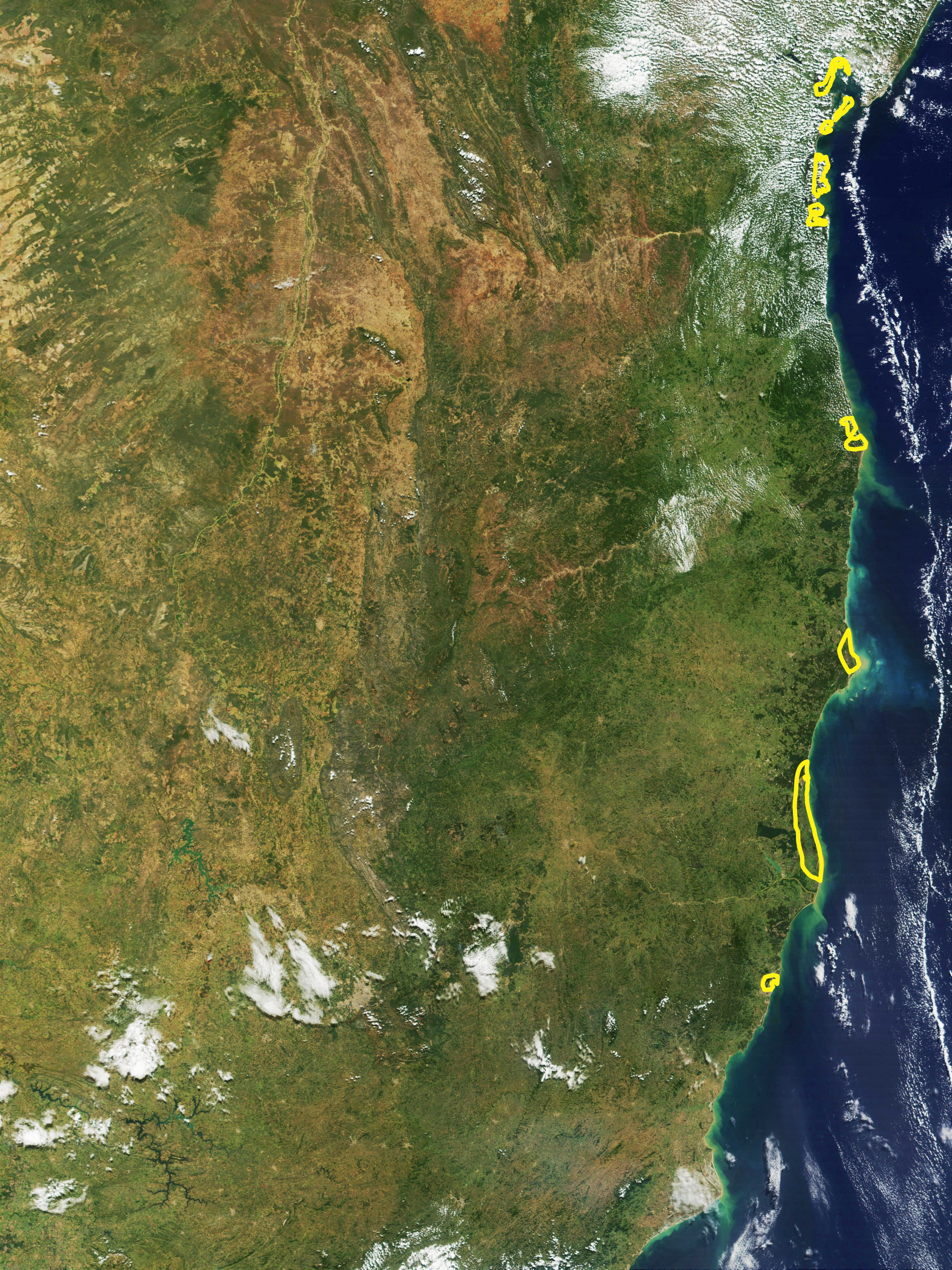
- map of the Bahia mangroves ecoregion (outlined in yellow).

Ecology
- Realm: Neotropical
- Biome: mangroves
- Borders: Atlantic Coast restingas; Bahia coastal forests

Geography
- Area: 2,100 km^{2} (810 sq mi)
- Country: Brazil
- States: Bahia; Espírito Santo

Conservation
- Conservation status: Critical/endangered

The Bahia mangroves is a tropical ecoregion of the mangroves biome, and the South American Atlantic Forest biome, located in Northeastern Brazil. Its conservation status is considered to be critical/endangered due to global climate change and other factors.

== Geography ==
The Bahia mangrove habitats occupy minor bays, estuaries, and river inlets along the coast from Recôncavo on Todos os Santos Bay in Bahia State; north to the Doce River in Espírito Santo State.

The total ecoregion comprises 2,100 square kilometers (800 square miles) of shallow coastal waters and land.

== Flora ==
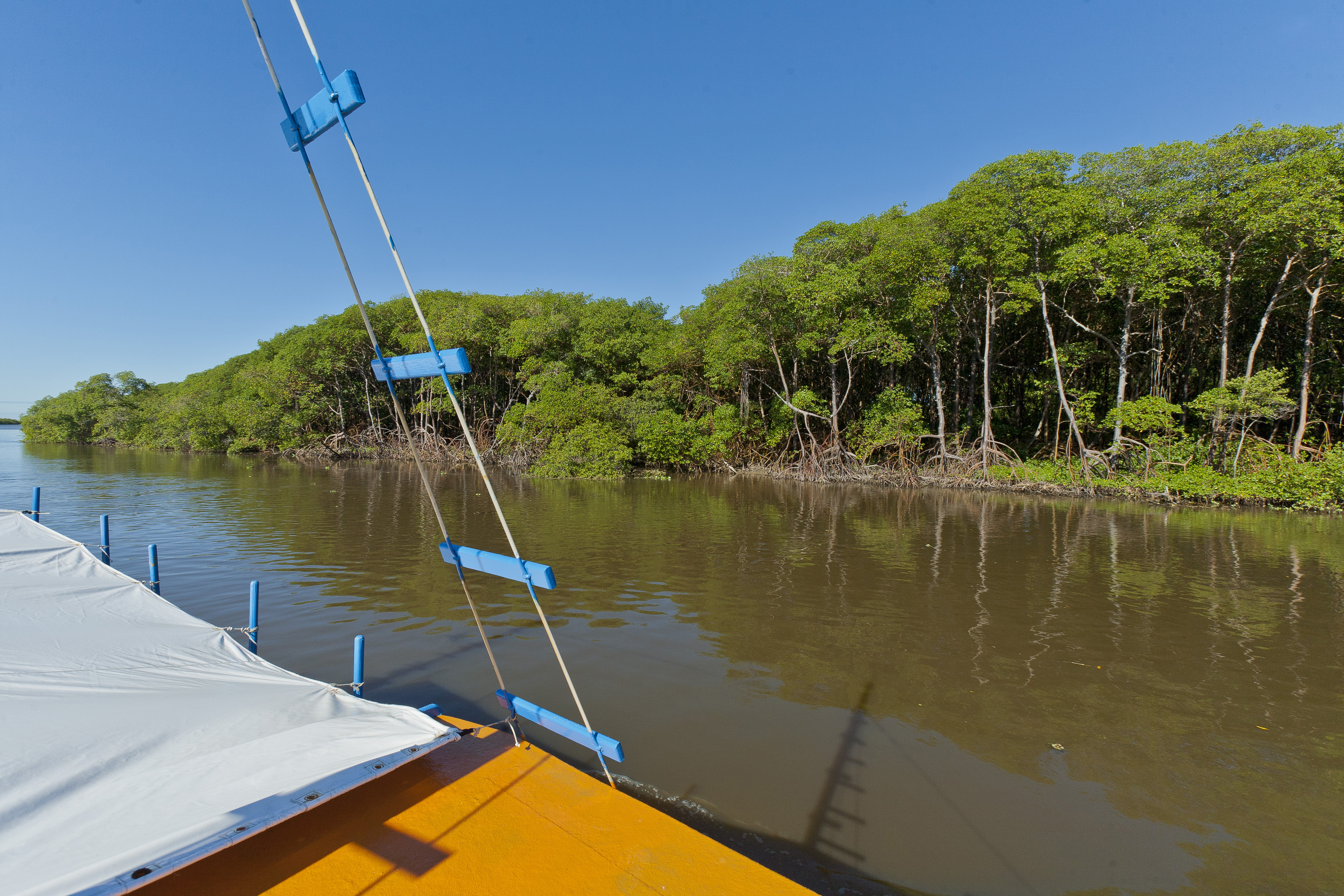
Bahia mangroves

Mangrove tree species include typical Atlantic Ocean tropical mangrove species, the red mangrove (Rhizophora mangle) of the Rhizophoraceae, the black mangrove (Avicennia germinans) of the Acanthaceae, and the white mangrove (Laguncularia racemosa) of the Combretaceae family.

== Fauna ==
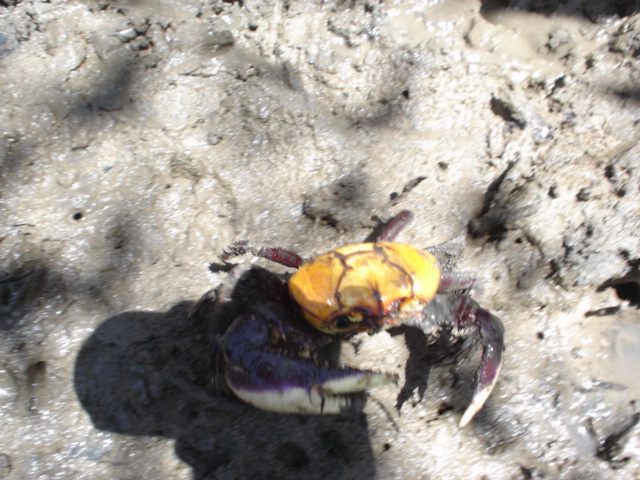
Ucides cordatus

Benthic macrofauna are an important basis underlying the ecological functioning of coastal food webs in the Bahia mangroves ecoregion. Mangroves provide habitat for juvenile fishes and crustacea. The Mangrave crab (Ucides cordatus) is particularly important as an economic and subsistence resource and as a bioindicator of environmental pollution.

The ecoregion is home to five species of sea turtle: the loggerhead turtle (Caretta caretta), green turtle (Chelonia mydas), leatherback turtle (Dermochelys coriacea), hawksbill turtle (Eretmochelys imbricata), and olive turtle (Lepidochelys olivacea). All of these are endangered.

Both local and migratory birds utilize the Bahia mangroves. The mangroves provide homes to the black-hooded antwren (Myrmotherula urosticta), Bahia tapaculo (Scytalopus psychopompus) and Dubois' seed-eater (Sporophila falcirostris). Bahia mangroves provide nesting sites for the great egret (Casmerodius albus), little blue heron (Florida caerulea), and snowy egret (Egretta thula). The semipalmated plover (Charadrius semipalmatus) and whimbrel (Numenius phaeopus) migrate to the area where they are found between September and April.

== Conservation ==
Mangrove ecosystems can naturally absorb amounts of carbon dioxide comparable to the Amazon rainforest, making them a valuable resource in countering global climate change.

Global climate change is leading to rising sea levels and to rising water temperatures, which in turn threaten crabs, oysters and other creatures in the Bahia mangroves' food chain. Water levels are observed to have risen 20-30 centimeters in the past 100 years, along the coast of Bahia state. While many plants in the mangrove ecosystem are fairly resilient, other marine life is less so. Crabs, for example, depend on a narrow range of water temperature and acidity.

Traditional hand-catching methods for Mangrave crabs that have developed in local communities in Brazil attempt to maintain the crab population at a subsistence level. The population is under threat in part due to predatory techniques of tangle-netting that are being introduced by members of marginalized groups entering the Bahia mangroves and exploiting them for survival.

Clearing of the mangrove forests for development is also a significant conservation threat. Approximately 4% of mangroves worldwide were estimated to be lost between 1980 and 2005. Brazilian mangroves are threatened by coastal urban sprawl, and by managed aquiculture enterprises, such as shrimp farms in Salinas da Margarida.

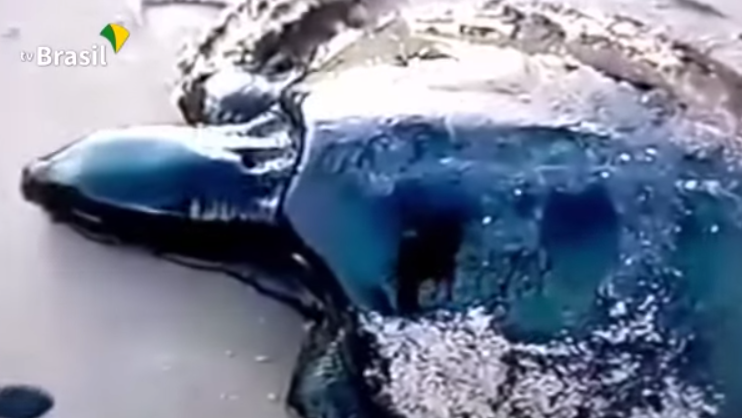
Oil-covered sea turtle

In 2019 the worst oil spill in Brazilian history polluted more than 2,400 km (1,500 mi) of Brazilian coastline, including parts of Abrolhos Marine National Park and areas of Bahia mangroves and coral reefs. Such areas are considered "particularly vulnerable to damage" and extremely difficult to clean.

All mangroves in Brazil are legally designated as "permanent protection zones" or ‘Areas of Permanent Protection’(APPs) in 2002. An attempt was made to rescind this protection in September 2020 by Environment Minister Ricardo Salles, the National Environmental Council, and the Brazilian government of Jair Bolsonaro. The attempt was blocked by a Brazilian Federal court judge who ruled that repeal of the protections would violate "the constitutional right to an ecologically balanced environment".

== See also ==
- List of plants of Atlantic Forest vegetation of Brazil — flora of its diverse ecoregions.
- Ecoregions in the Atlantic Forest biome
- Mangrove ecoregions
- List of ecoregions in Brazil
