= Lista de espécies da flora do Brasil =

Catalogue of plant species in Brazil

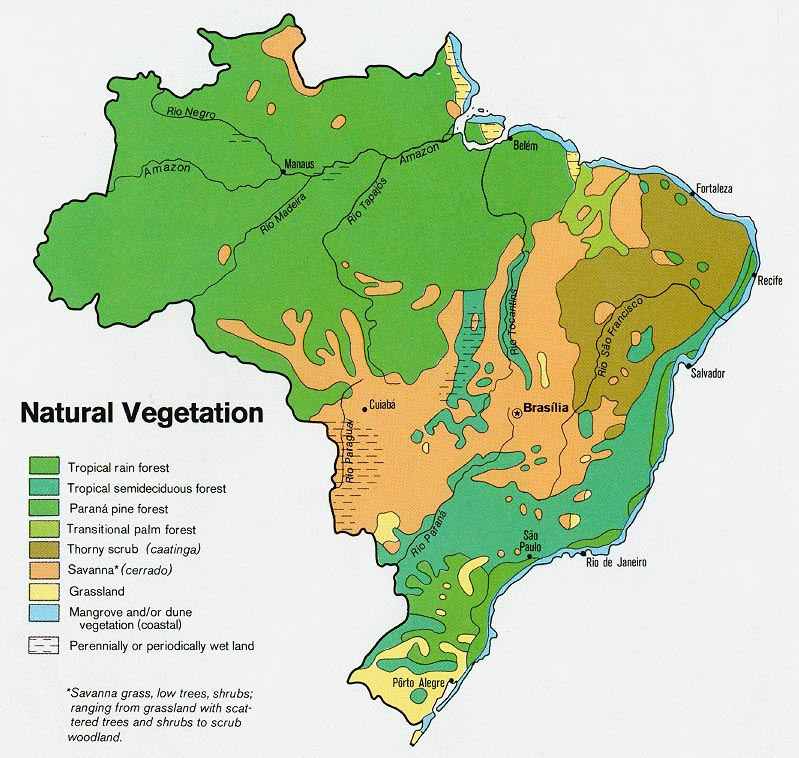
Map of Brazilian biomes

Lista de espécies da flora do Brasil (List of species of the flora of Brazil, "The Brazilian List"), first produced in 2010 provides a list of species of plants found in Brazil. At that time it listed a total of 40,982 species, including 3,608 fungi, 3,495 algae, 1,521 bryophytes, 1,176 pteridophytes, 26 gymnosperms and 31,156 angiosperm species. The list is constantly updated with more than 400 taxonomists working on the online database.

== Description ==
In addition to the accepted scientific names, the database provides information on geographic distribution, habitat, life forms and images of herbarium specimens and plants in their natural habitats. The species list covers all seven Brazilian biomes:

- Amazônia (Amazon tropical rain forest)
- Caatinga (Thorny scrub)
- Campos Sulinos (Pampa or grassland)
- Cerrado (Savanna)
- Manguezal (Mangrove)
- Mata Atlântica Atlantic tropical semideciduous forest)
- Pantanal (Wetlands)

== History ==
The Brazilian Flora has been recognized as the richest in the world. Brazil is a signatory to the Convention on Biological Diversity (CBD) which implemented the Global Strategy for Plant Conservation (GSPC), whose goals include the development of "An online flora of all known plants" (Target 1). The Ministério do Meio Ambiente (Ministry of the Environment) then appointed the Jardim Botânico do Rio de Janeiro (Botanical Garden of Rio de Janeiro) to coordinate the preparation of such a list.

In September 2008 a meeting was held in the Botanical Garden of Rio de Janeiro, in which 17 taxonomists from different institutions across the country participated. At this meeting, the organizing committee was established and the coordinators of each taxonomic group appointed. The first version of this list was then published in 2010. The first phase was completed in November 2015. it is being replaced by a new system known as The Brazilian Flora 2020 project with nearly 700 scientists and institutions world wide as part of the Reflora programme to create a virtual herbarium, in conjunction with the Sistema de Informação sobre a Biodiversidade Brasileira (SiBBr) and Institutos Nacionais de Ciência e Teconologia (INCT). As of May 2016 46,088 species are listed.

== See also ==
- Geography of Brazil
- List of ecoregions in Brazil

== Bibliography ==
- "Brazilian Flora 2020". Reflora. Flora do Brasil 2020. Institute of Research, Rio de Janeiro Botanical Garden. 2016.
- "INCT – Herbário Virtual da Flora e dos Fungos" (in Portuguese and English). Institutos Nacionais de Ciência e Teconologia. 2016.
