= Rio São Francisco mangroves =

Series of mangrove forests in Brazil

Rio Sao Francisco mangroves
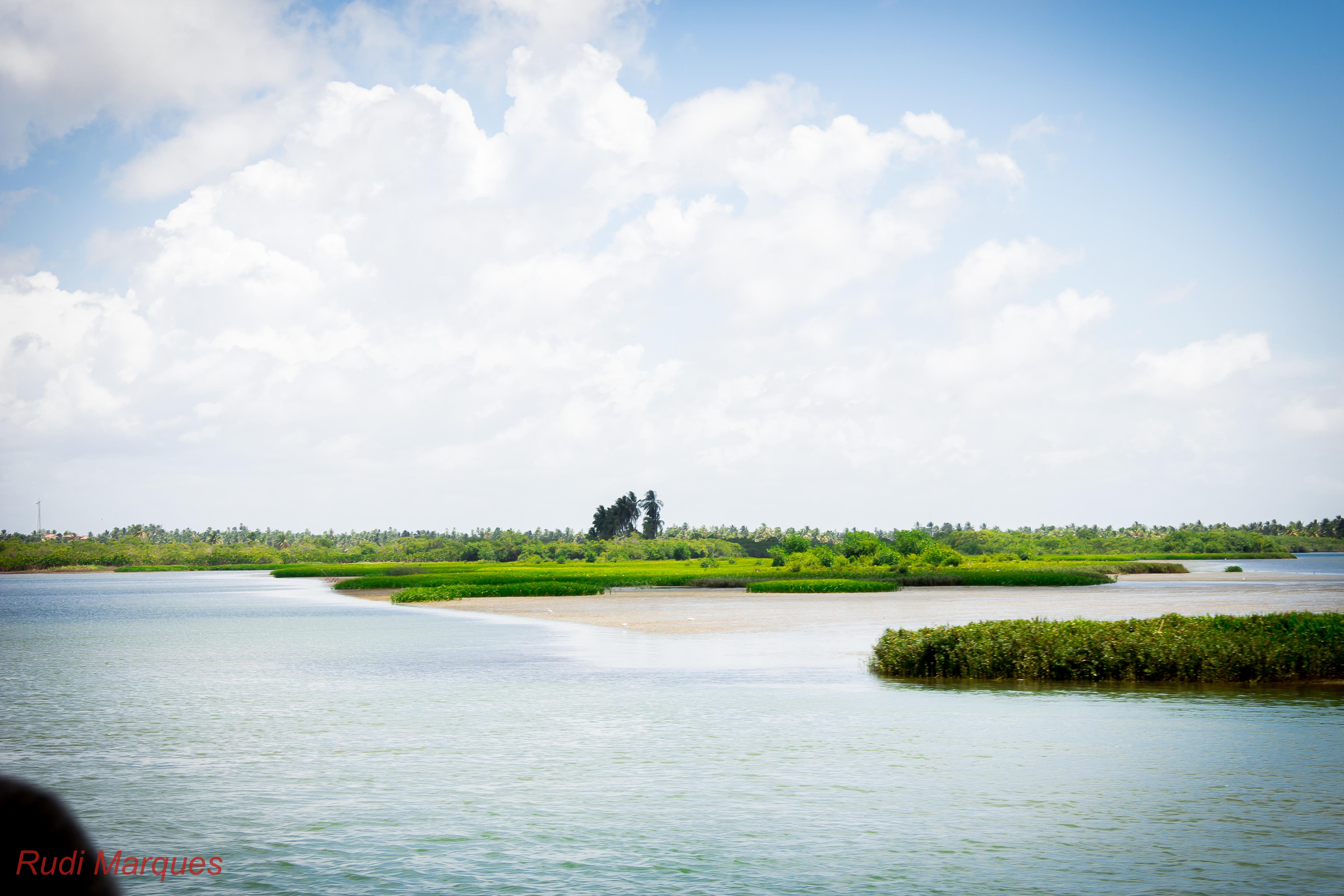
- Estuary of the São Francisco River

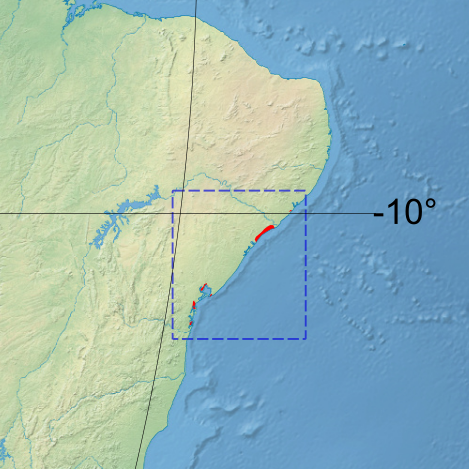
- Ecoregion territory (in red)

Ecology
- Realm: Neotropic
- Biome: Mangroves

Geography
- Area: 2,590 km^{2} (1,000 sq mi)
- Country: Brazil
- Coordinates: 12.77°S 38.82°W

The Rio Sao Francisco mangroves ecoregion (WWF ID: NT1433) covers series of mangrove forests along the Atlantic Ocean coast of eastern Brazil, from the outskirts of Maceió southwards to just south of Salvador, Bahia. This ecoregion has high biodiversity, as it lies in different sub-climate zones, with a dry season in the north but not in the south.

== Location and description ==
The ecoregion exists in patches of mangrove forests, mostly around river estuaries, along 500 km of the coast of eastern Brazil. This length of coast covers much of the states of Alagoas, Sergipe, and Bahia. The ecoregion's mangroves are most significant in three areas:

- Barra de São Miguel, Alagoas, around the margins of the inlet of the Lagoa do Roteiro. This relatively small sector is surrounded by the Pernambuco coastal forests ecoregion.
- São Francisco River Estuary, the mouth of the fourth longest river in South America. Also in this sector is the mouth of the Sergipe River at the city of Aracaju. The Vaza-Barris River also enters the Atlantic in this region. This sector is surrounded by the Pernambuco interior forests ecoregion.
- Bay of All Saints in the state of Bahia, and the city of Salvador, Bahia. Feeding this bay is the Paraguaçu River. This sector is surrounded by the Bahia coastal forests ecoregion.

== Climate ==
The climate of the ecoregion is Tropical monsoon climate (Köppen climate classification (Am)). This climate is characterized by relatively even temperatures throughout the year (all months being greater than 18 °C (64 °F) average temperature), and a pronounced dry season. The driest month has less than 60 mm of precipitation, but more than (100-(average/25) mm. This climate is mid-way between a tropical rainforest and a tropical savannah. The dry month usually at or right after the winter solstice in the Northern Hemisphere. Precipitation averages 1,250 to 1,500 mm/year. The dry season in the north lasts 4–5 months.

== Flora and fauna ==
The mangroves of the area are surrounded by beaches on the coast, and forest and coastal retsingas on the inland side. The characteristic mangrove trees species are red mangrove (Rhizophora mangle), black mangrove (Aviccenia shaueriana), and white mangrove (Laguncularia racemosa).

The region is important resting and feeding stop for long-distance migratory birds such as the ruddy turnstone (Arenaria interpres), spotted sandpiper (Actitis macularia), and whimbrel (Numenius phaeopus).

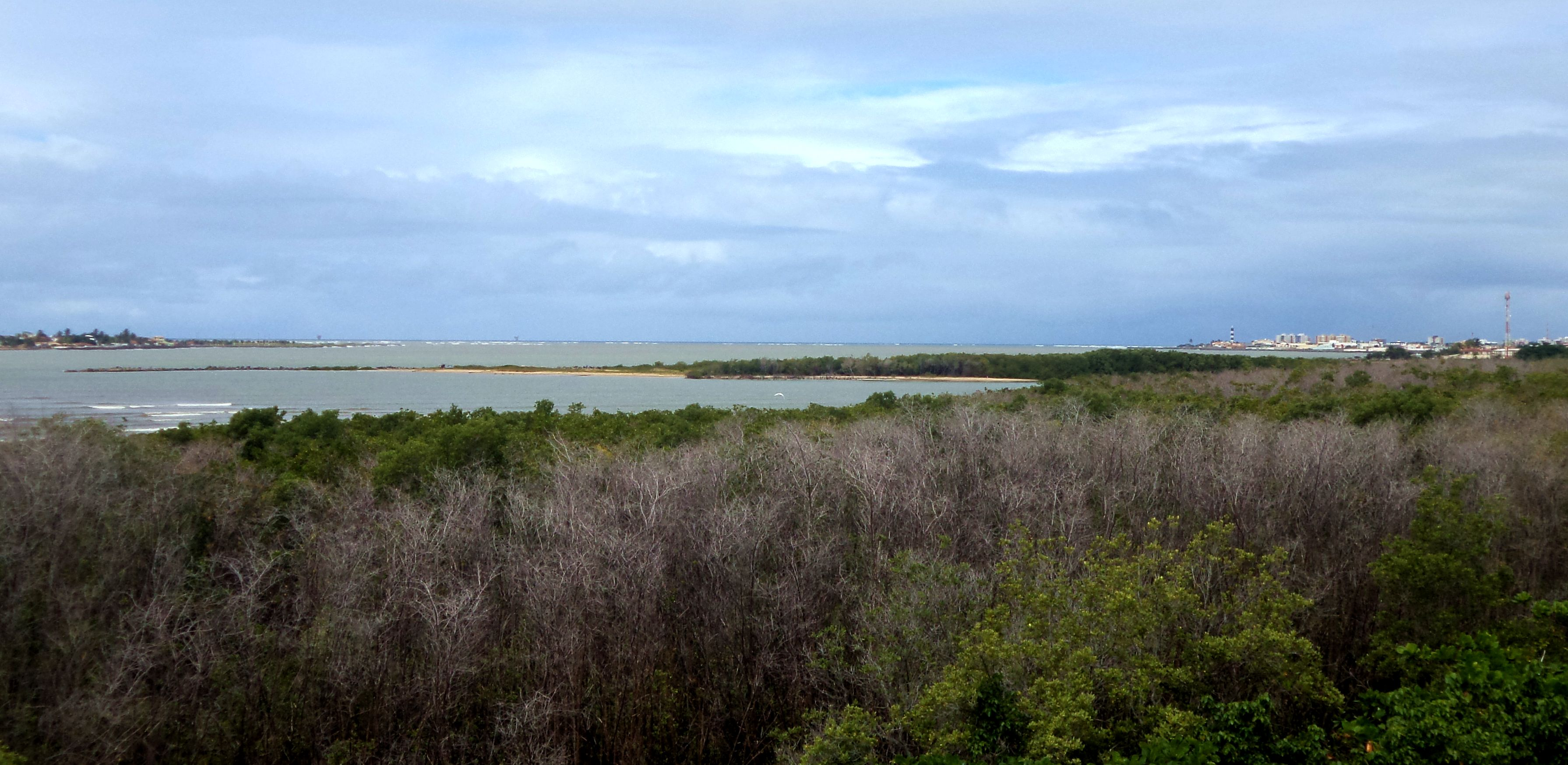
Sergipe River, near Aracaju, Brazil

== Protected areas ==
Officially protected areas in the ecoregion include:

- Piaçabuçu Environmental Protection Area
- Área de Proteção Ambiental Mangue Seco, near the village of Mangue Seco
- Santa Isabel Biological Reserve
