= Atlantic Forest =

South American forest

Atlantic Forest Portuguese: Mata Atlântica Spanish: Bosque atlántico
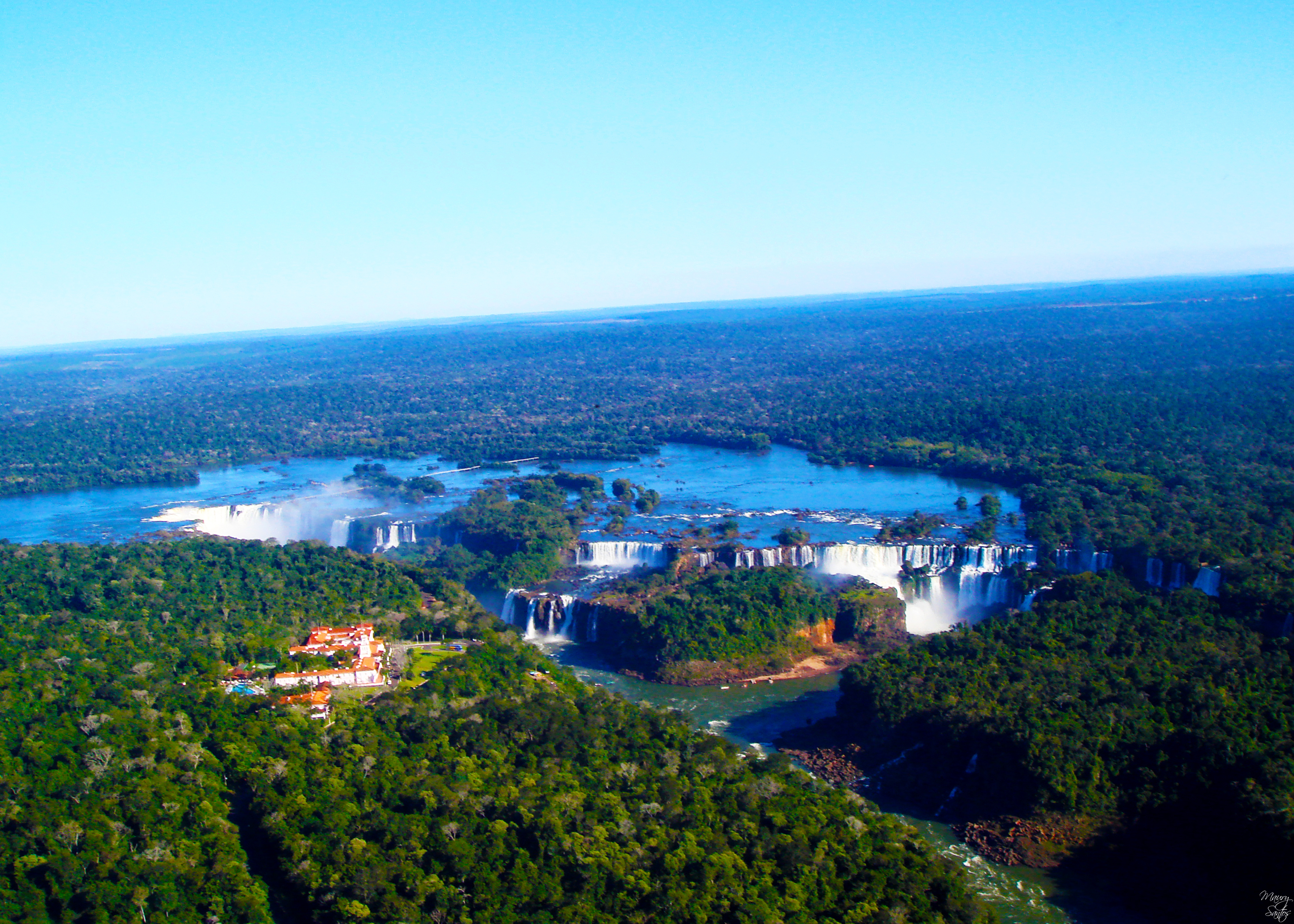
- Aerial view of Iguaçu National Park and Iguazú National Park

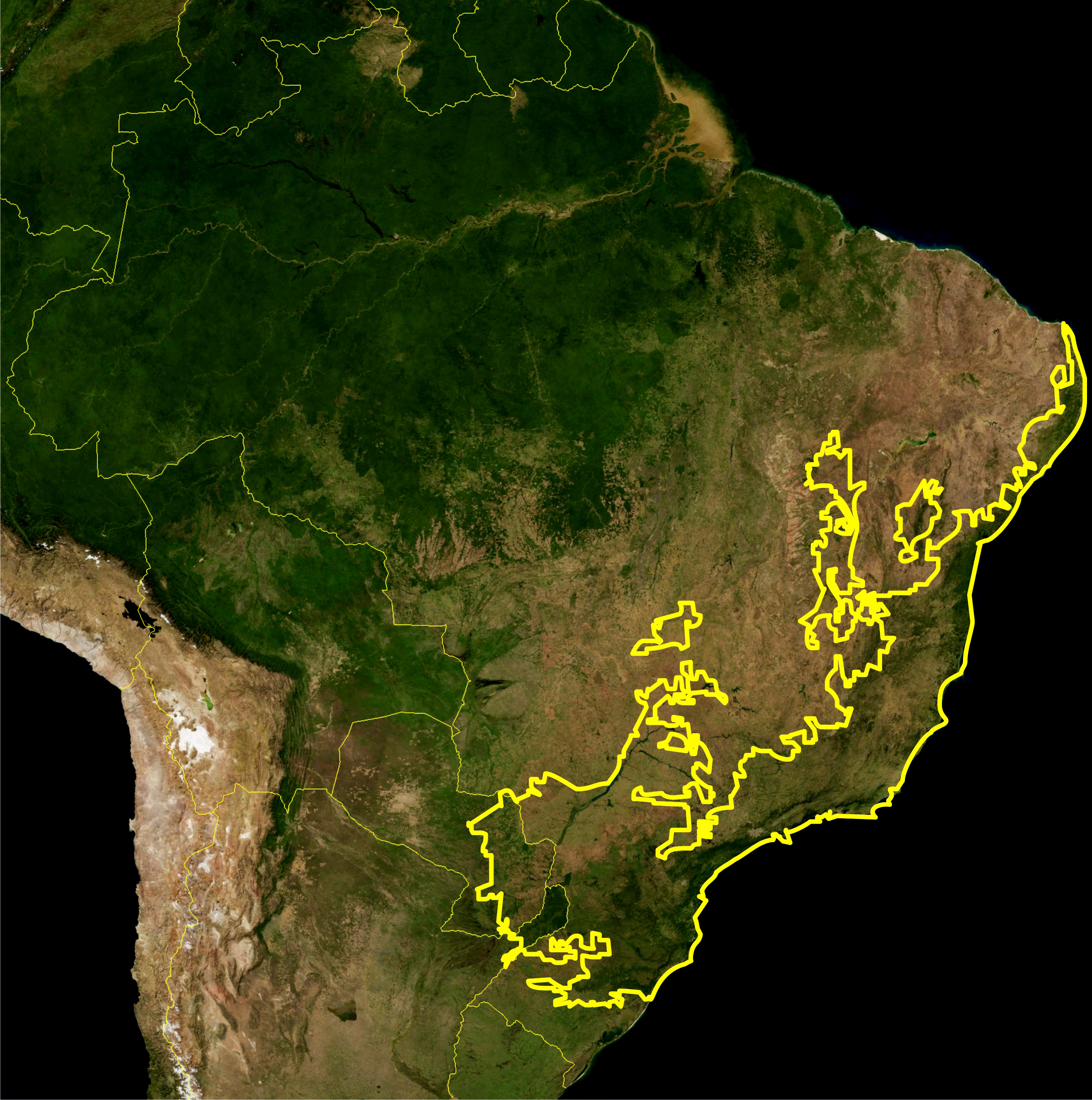
- Map of the Atlantic Forest ecoregions as delineated by the WWF. The yellow line approximately encloses the forest's distribution. (Satellite image from NASA)

Geography
- Location: Argentina, Brazil and Paraguay
- Area: 1,315,460 km^{2} (507,900 sq mi)

Discovery Coast Atlantic Forest Reserves
UNESCO World Heritage Site
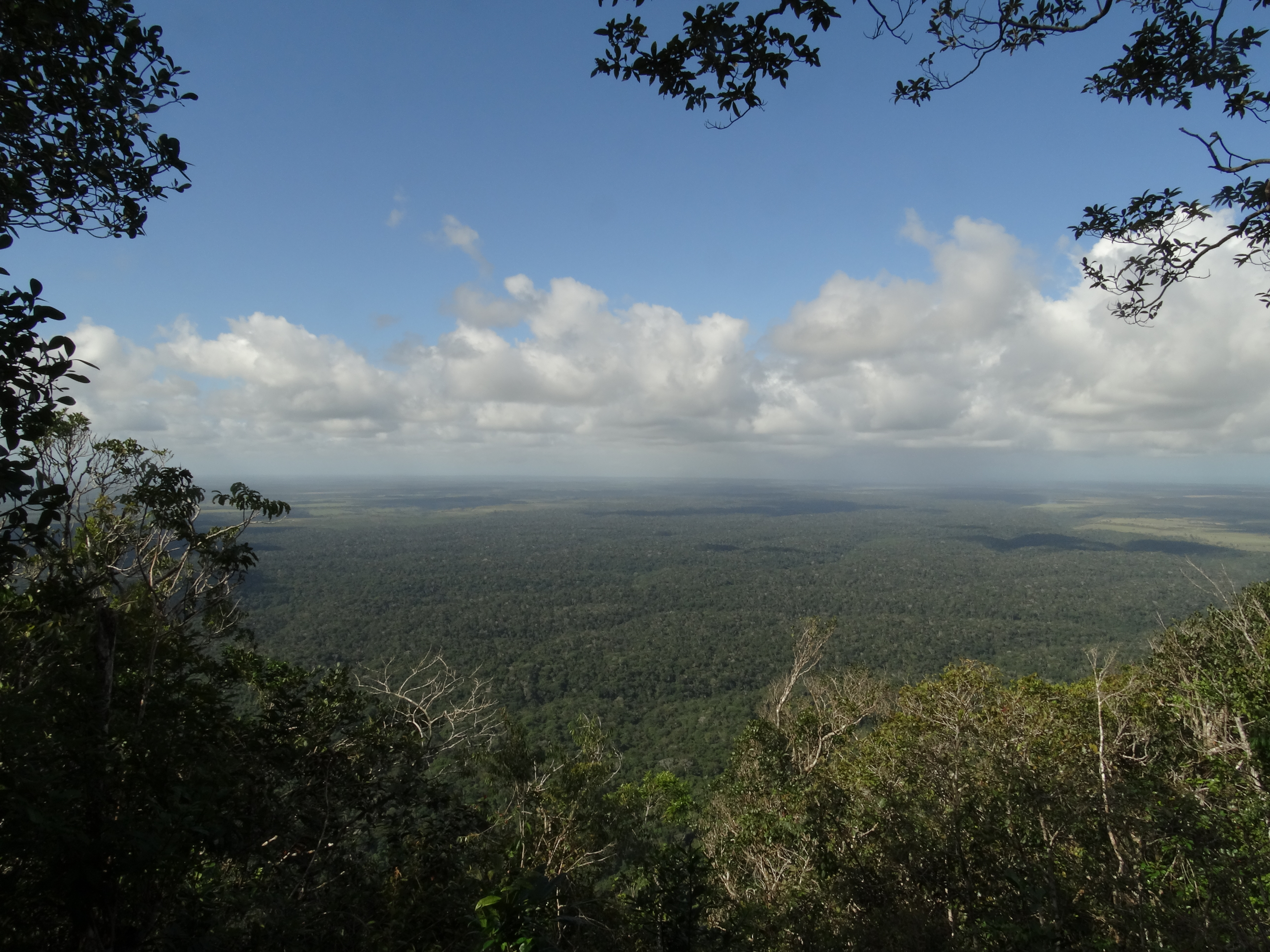
- Atlantic Forest in Bahia State, Brazil
- Interactive map of Discovery Coast Atlantic Forest Reserves
- Location: Brazil
- Includes: Una Biological Reserve, PAU Brazil CEPLAC Experimental Station, Veracruz Station, Pau Brasil National Park, Descobrimento National Park, Monte Pascoal National Park, Linhares Forest Reserve and Sooretama Biological Reserve
- Criteria: Natural: ix, x
- Reference: 892
- Inscription: 1999 (23rd Session)
- Area: 111,930 ha (276,600 acres)

Atlantic Forest South-East Reserves
UNESCO World Heritage Site
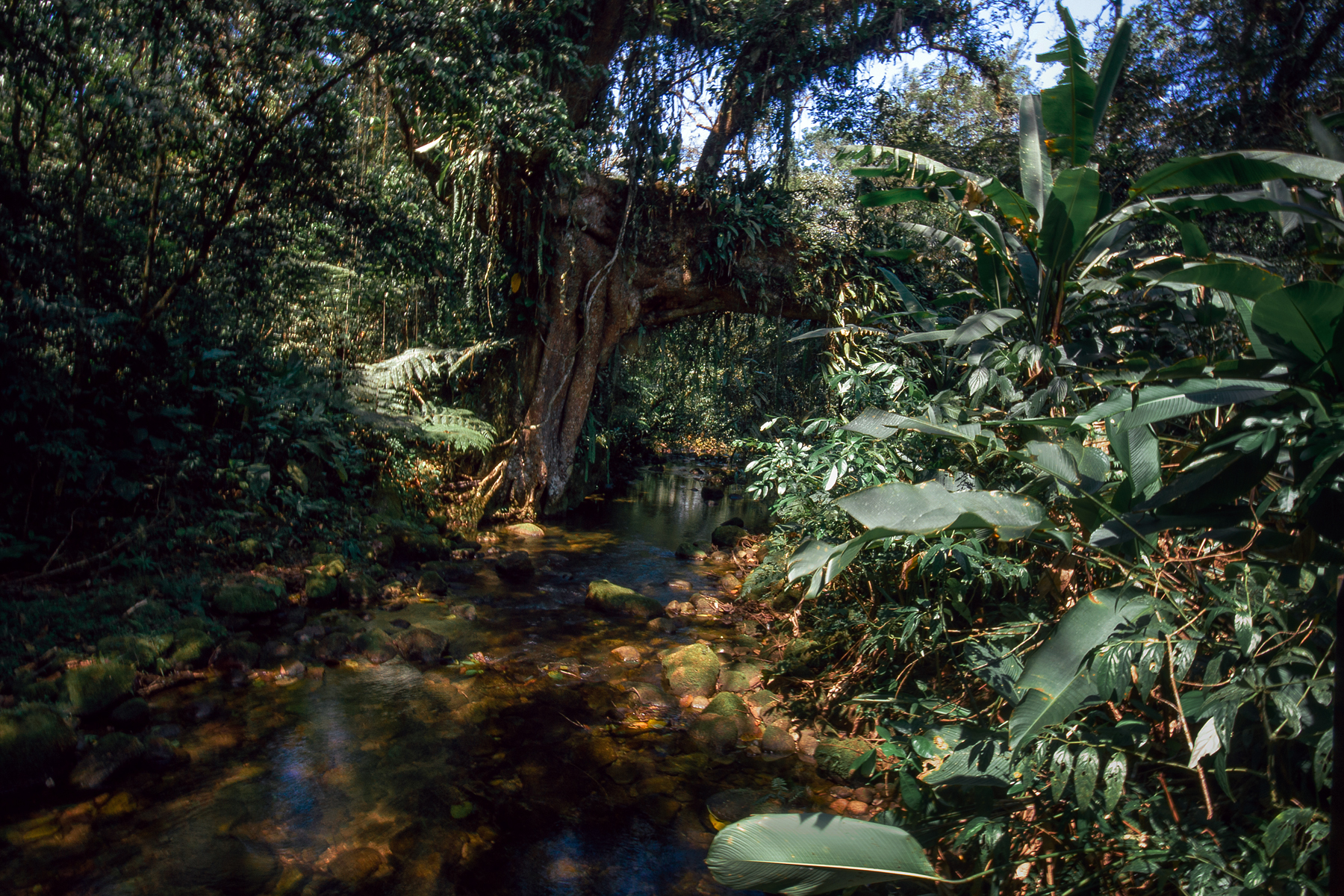
- View from a trail in the Salto Morato Reserve
- Interactive map of Atlantic Forest South-East Reserves
- Official name: Atlantic Forest South-East Reserves
- Location: Paraná and São Paulo, Brazil
- Includes: 25 protected areas
- Criteria: Natural: (vii)(ix)(x)
- Reference: 893rev
- Inscription: 1999 (23rd Session)
- Area: 468,193 ha (1,807.70 sq mi)
- Coordinates: 24°10′S 48°0′W

The Atlantic Forest (Portuguese: Mata Atlântica) is a moist broadleaf forest that extends along the Atlantic coast of Brazil from Rio Grande do Norte state in the northeast to Rio Grande do Sul state in the south and inland as far as Paraguay and the Misiones Province of Argentina, where it is known as the Missionary rainforest (Spanish: Selva Misionera).

The Atlantic Forest has ecoregions within the following biome categories: seasonal moist and dry broad-leaf tropical forests, tropical and subtropical grasslands, savannas, and shrublands, and mangrove forests. The Atlantic Forest is characterized by a high biodiversity and endemism.

It was the first environment that the Portuguese colonists encountered over 500 years ago, when it was thought to have had an area of 1,000,000–1,500,000 km^{2} (390,000–580,000 mi^{2}), and stretching an unknown distance inland, making it, back then, the second largest rainforest on the planet, only behind the Amazon rainforest. Over 85% of the original area has been deforested, threatening many plant and animal species with extinction.

== Ecology ==
The Atlantic Forest region includes forests of several variations:

- Restinga is a forest type that grows on stabilized coastal dunes. Restinga forests are generally closed canopy short forests with tree density. Open restinga is an open, savanna-like formation with scattered clumps of small trees and shrubs and an extensive layer of herbs, grasses, and sedges.
- Seasonal tropical moist forests may receive more than 2,000 mm (79 in) of rain a year. These include Tropical Moist: Lowland Forests, Submontane Forest, and Montane Forests.
- Tabuleiro forests are found over very moist clay soils and Tabuleiro Savannas occur over faster-draining sand soils. These are humid areas that rely on water vapor from the ocean.
- Further inland are the Atlantic dry forests, which form a transition between the arid Caatinga to the northeast and the Cerrado savannas to the west. These forests are lower in stature; more open, with high abundance of deciduous trees and lower diversity when compared to tropical moist forests. These forests have between 700 and 1600 mm of precipitation annually with a distinct dry season. This includes Deciduous and Seasonal semideciduous forest each with their own lowland and montane regions.
- Montane forests are higher altitude wet forests across mountains and plateaus of southern Brazil. Also called Araucaria moist forests.
- The Mussununga forests occur in southern Bahia and northern Espírito Santo states. The Mussununga ecosystem ranges from grasslands to woodlands associated with sandy spodosols. The word Mussununga is Amerindian Tupi-Guarani meaning soft and wet white sand.
- Shrubby montane savannas occur at the highest elevations, also called Campo rupestre.

The Atlantic Forest is unusual in that it extends as a true tropical rain forest to latitudes as far as 28°S. This is because the trade winds produce precipitation throughout the southern winter. In fact, the northern Zona da Mata of northeastern Brazil receives much more rainfall between May and August than during the southern summer. The geographic range of Atlantic Forest vary depending on author or institution that published them. Information on four most important boundaries as well as their union and intersection was reviewed in 2018.

== Geography ==
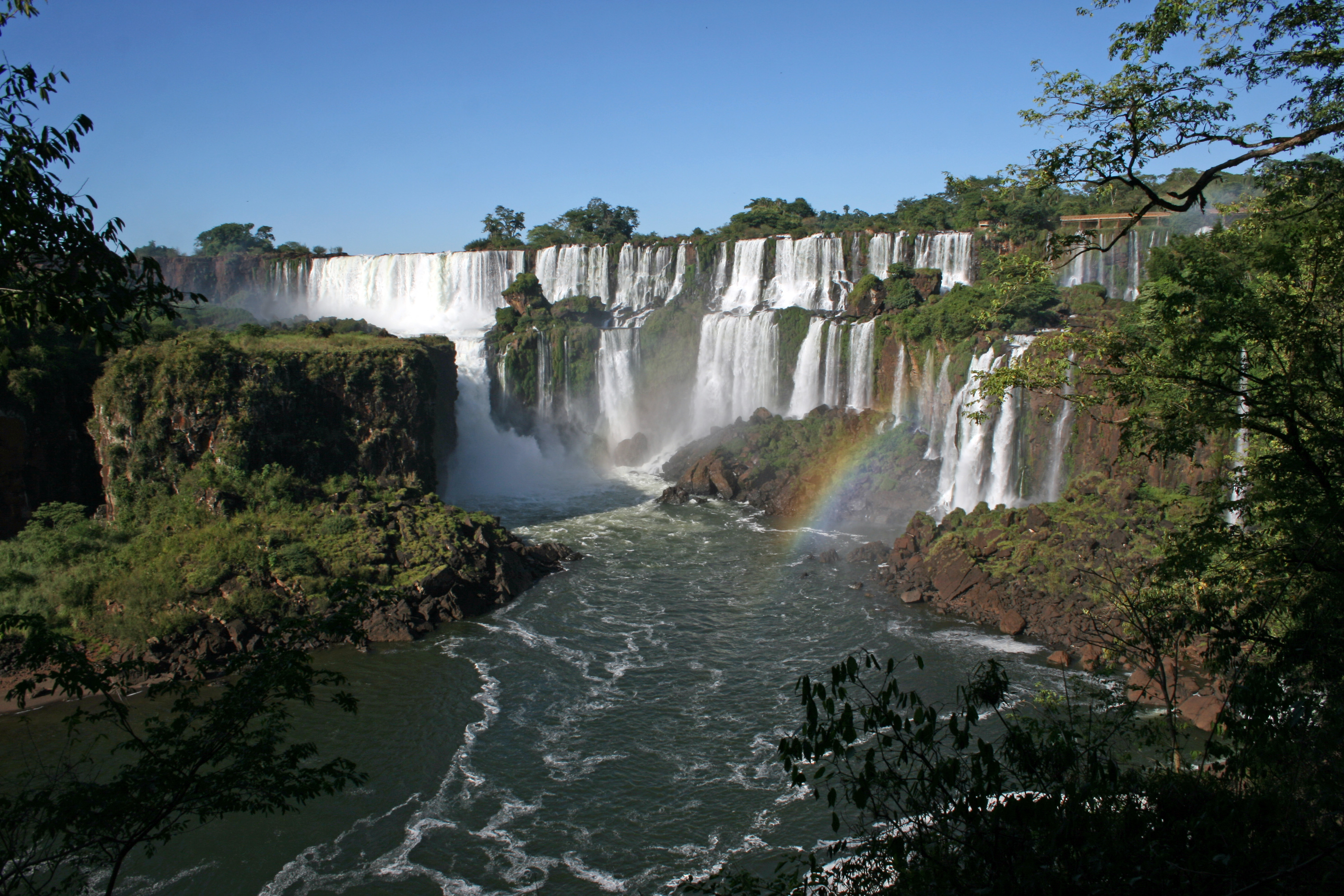
The Iguazu Falls are located south of the Atlantic Forest.

The Atlantic Forest mainly covers regions of eastern Brazil (92% of the total area), but also reaches eastern Paraguay (6%) and northeastern Argentina (2%).

== History ==
The Atlantic Forest has undergone great changes across the last two epochs. Human interaction and environmental changes have been major factors in the ecological history of the forest region.

During glacial periods in the Pleistocene, the Atlantic Forest is known to have shrunk to extremely small fragmented refugia in highly sheltered gullies, being separated by areas of dry forest or semi-deserts known as caatingas. Humans first interacted with the Atlantic Forest 18,000 years ago during the Late Pleistocene. The Atlantic Forest region was very different in the Pleistocene than today. Vegetation ranged from a few rain-heavy forests to an abundance of dry open grasslands and forests.

Early human hunting likely resulted in the first mass extinctions of large mammals in the Atlantic Forest region. Indigenous groups in the Holocene used slash-and-burn agriculture which transformed biological corridors into food resources. Changes in landscape and faunal demographics contributed to greater ecological changes in the Holocene. Ecological changes in this era were signified by the increase in dense rainforests.

Unlike refugia for equatorial rainforests, the refuges for the Atlantic Forest have never been the product of detailed identification.

By the time of European colonization circa 1500 CE, the Atlantic Forest stretched approximately 1,300,000 km^{2} (500,000 sq mi). The regions first encountered by Europeans were not pristine landscape. Researchers estimate that Indigenous land management shaped 60–80% of the forest landscape by the time of European contact. Portuguese colonists exploited Indigenous labor and knowledge to extract Paubrasilia echinata for the red dye the trunk of the plant could produce. Portuguese sugar plantations, engenho, had the most impact on the Atlantic Forest region in colonial times. Colonists needed forests cleared to both hold sugar plantations and to feed mill furnances for sugar conversion. Overtime, these interactions shaped the Atlantic Forest region in a manner that had not occurred under Indigenous land management.

The Atlantic Forest has become fragmented since early colonial interactions. Forest fragmentation continues to impact the Atlantic Forest region and contemporary conservation efforts.

The threatened existence of the golden lion tamarin sparked global interest in the Atlantic Forest in 1970.

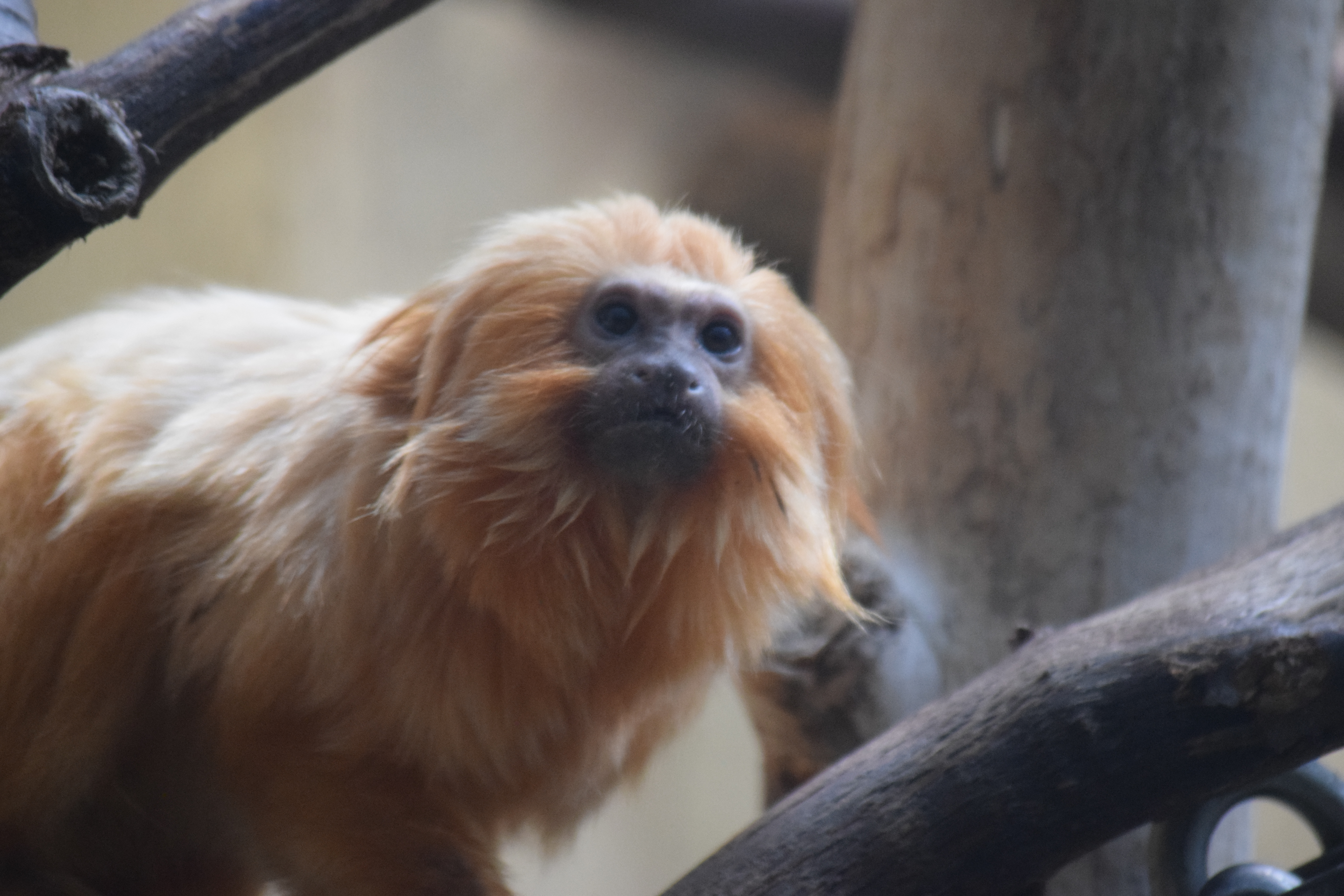
Golden lion tamarin in the Primate, Cat, and Aquatics building at the Cleveland Metroparks Zoo.

== Biodiversity ==
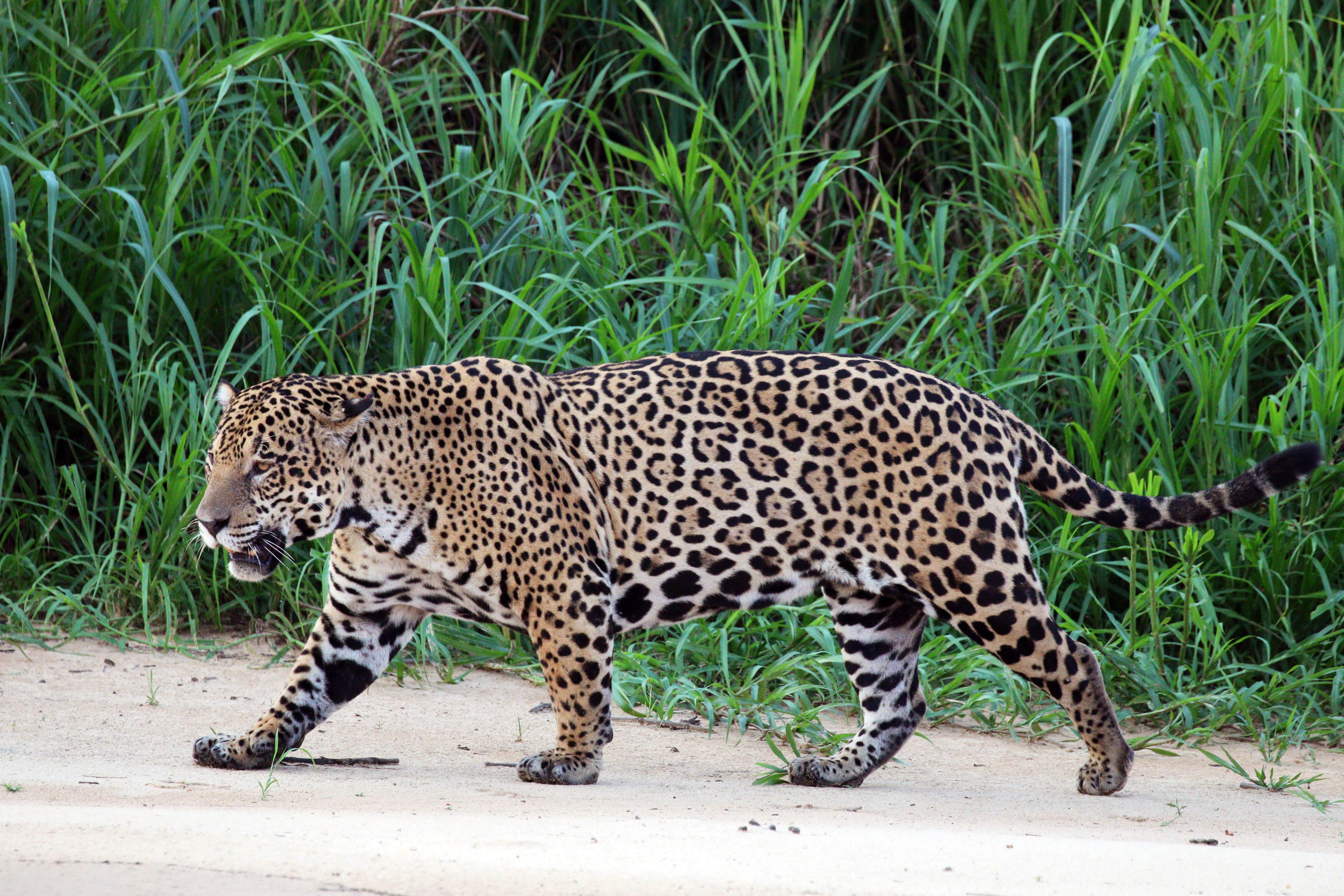
A jaguar in the forest

Despite having only 28% of native vegetation cover remaining, the Atlantic Forest remains extraordinarily lush in biodiversity and endemic species, many of which are threatened with extinction. Approximately 40 percent of its vascular plants and up to 60 percent of its vertebrates are endemic species, meaning they are found nowhere else in the world. The official threatened species list of Brazil contains over 140 terrestrial mammal species found in Atlantic Forest. In Paraguay the Atlantic Forest has been heavily impacted in recent years. In Paraguay there are 35 species listed as threatened, and 22 species are listed as threatened in the interior portion of the Atlantic Forest of Argentina. Nearly 250 species of amphibians, birds, and mammals have become extinct due to the result of human activity in the past 400 years. Over 11,000 species of plants and animals are considered threatened today in the Atlantic Forest. Over 52% of the tree species and 92% of the amphibians are endemic to this area. The forest harbors around 20,000 species of plants, with almost 450 tree species being found in just one hectare in some locations.

The Atlantic Forest is one of the best studied tropical ecosystems. For example, over 3000 tree species, 98 bat species, 94 large or medium-sized mammal species, over 2000 epiphyte species, 26 primate species, 528 amphibian species, 124 small mammal species, and over 800 bird species have been recorded in the Atlantic Forest.

New species are continually being found in the Atlantic Forest. In fact, between 1990 and 2006 over a thousand new flowering plants were discovered. Furthermore, in 1990 researchers re-discovered a small population of the black-faced lion tamarin (Leontopithecus caissara), previously thought to have been extinct. In 1991, the butterfly Actinote zikani was rediscovered in southern Brazil, after being declared extinct ten years earlier. A new species of blonde capuchin (Cebus queirozi), named for its distinguishing bright blonde hair, was discovered in northeastern Brazil at the Pernambuco Endemism Center in 2006. A species of endangered three-toed sloth, named the maned sloth (Bradypus torquatus) because of its long hair, is endemic to the Atlantic Forest. Hylid tree frog Dendropsophus branneri is also endemic to the Atlantic Forest.

== Conservation ==
=== Human impact ===
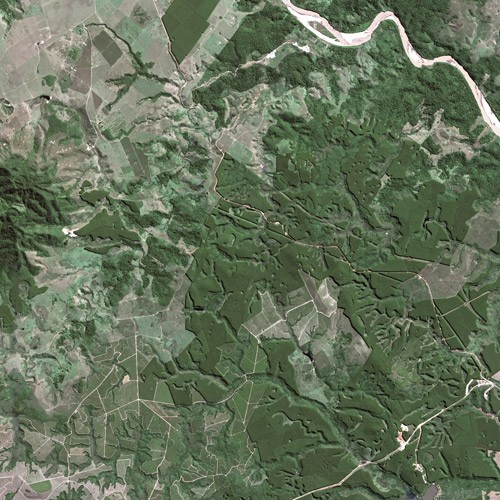
Atlantic Forest fragmentation

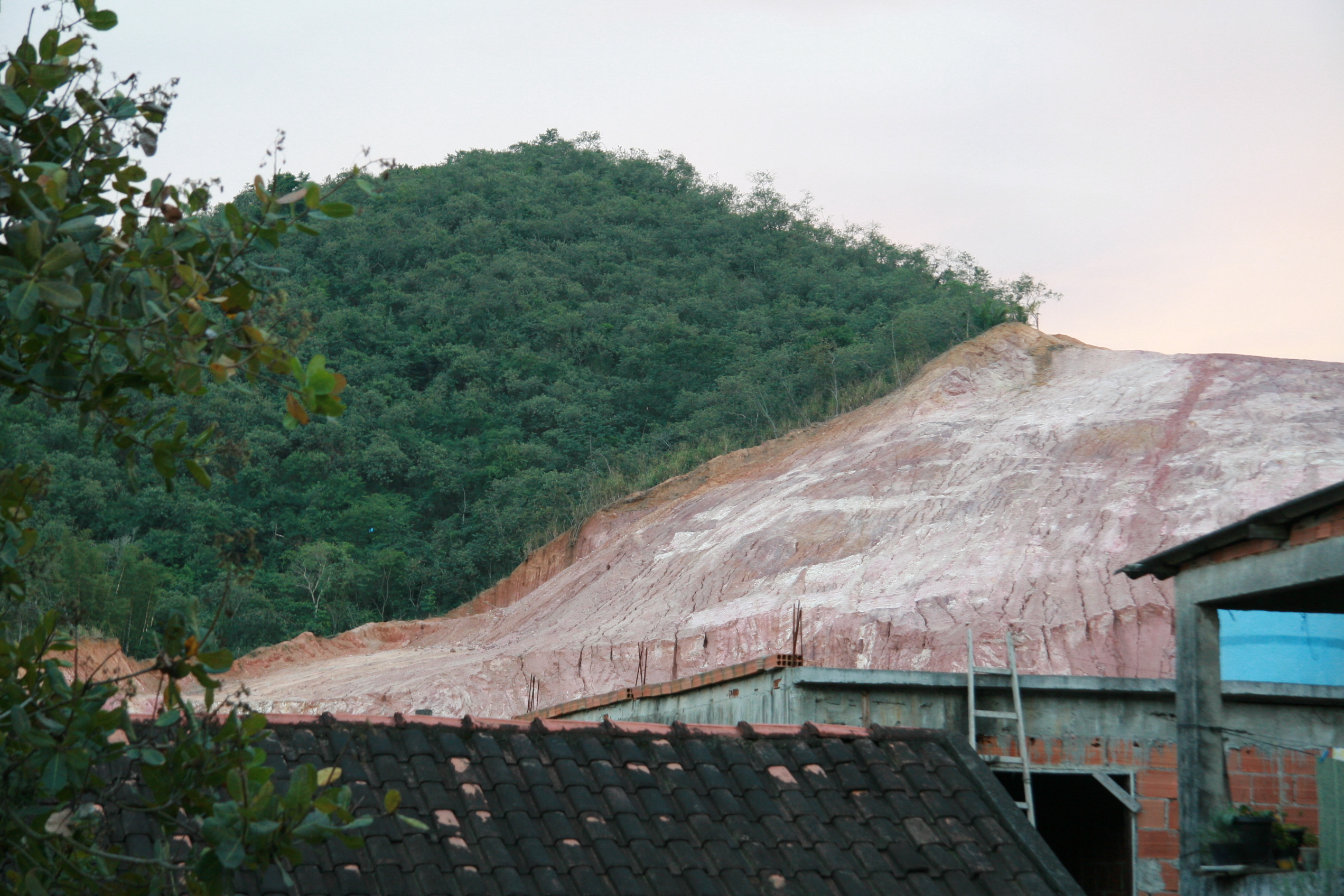
Deforestation of Atlantic Forest in Rio de Janeiro

The incorporation of modern human societies and their needs for forest resources has greatly reduced the size of the Atlantic Forest, which has resulted in species impoverishment. Almost 88% of the original forest habitat has been lost and replaced by human-modified landscapes including pastures, croplands, and urban areas. This deforestation continues at an annual rate of 0.5% and up to 2.9% in urban areas.

Agriculture: A major portion of human land use in the Atlantic Rain Forest is for agriculture. Crops include sugar-cane, coffee, tea, tobacco and more recently soybean and biofuel crops.
Pasture: Even more common than using land for agriculture is the conversion of forest to cattle pastures. This is commonly done by slash and burn, which increases the likelihood of additional forest loss to human-induced wildfires.
Hunting: Species in a fragmented forest are more susceptible to decline in population size because they are in a confined area that is more accessible to hunters. Larger animals make up the highest percentage of biomass. These animals are also the most rewarding to hunters and are heavily hunted in accessible fragments. This results in a change in species interactions such as seed dispersal and competition for resources.
Logging: Logging removes 10 to 80% of the canopy cover of a forest, making that habitat more susceptible to natural elements such as wind and sunlight. This causes an increase in forest heating and desiccation. Large amounts of organic litter and debris build up, which results in an increase in forest vulnerability to fires. Additionally, logging roads create accessibility for humans, thereby increasing the rate of human land disturbance and decreasing the amount of natural forest.
Fire: Human activity such as logging causes an increase in debris along forest floors that makes the Atlantic Forest more susceptible to fires. This is a forest type that is not accustomed to regular fire activity, so human-induced fires dramatically affect the forest understory because plants do not have fire adaptations. As a result, the forest becomes even more vulnerable to secondary fires, which are far more destructive and kill many more species including large trees.

==== Results of human activity ====
Habitat fragmentation leads to a cascade of alterations of the original forest landscape. For example, the extent of human disturbances, including habitat destruction, in the Atlantic Forest has led to an extinction crisis. The endemic species in this region are especially vulnerable to extinction due to fragmentation because of their small geographic ranges and low occurrence. In a study of the Atlantic Forest fragments, community level biomass was reduced to 60% in plots less than 25 hectares. Key ecological processes such as seed dispersal, gene flow, colonization and other processes are disturbed by fragmentation. With many key vertebrate seed dispersers going extinct, it is predicted that many regional, fruit-bearing tree species in the Atlantic forest will become extinct due to failure of seedling recruitment and recolonisation. With all these species already threatened, it is predicted that with the persistence of current deforestation rates the Atlantic forest will see continued extinction of species.

=== Conservation by nongovernmental organizations ===
Due to the Atlantic Forest's vast diversity of endemic plants and animals as well as the fragmentation affecting these species, many groups and organizations are working to restore this unique ecosystem. Non-governmental organizations (NGO) are huge benefactors in Brazil, providing funding as well as professional help to the Atlantic Forest due to the Brazilian Environmental Movement.. One organization, called BirdLife International, uses its research to preserve the area's bird biodiversity and teach people about sustainable natural resource use.

Some organizations receive grants from the Critical Ecosystem Partnership Fund if they abide by its rules. These include the Species Protection Program, the Program for Supporting Private Natural Heritage Reserves and the Institutional Strengthening Program.

Another strategy being implemented to maintain biodiversity within the Atlantic Forest is creating wildlife corridors. The World Bank is donating $44 million to create a corridor, which will be known as the Central Biodiversity Corridor, in the Atlantic Forest and one in the Amazon. The Brazilian Development Bank has been financing, with non-reimbursable loans, 16 to 18 ecosystem restoration projects totaling 3,500 hectares and costing approximately $22 million under the so-called Iniciativa BNDES Mata Atlântica. In order to preserve diversity, the state of São Paulo has created the Restinga de Bertioga State Park, a 9.3 thousand hectares park which also serves as a wildlife corridor linking the coastal regions to the Serra do Mar mountain range. Some organizations, such as the Nature Conservancy, are planning to restore parts of the forest that have been lost and to build corridors that are compatible with the lifestyles of the native people. The Amazon Institute is active in reforestation efforts in the northeastern state of Pernambuco, Brazil. During 2007, Joao Milanez and Joanne Stanulonis have planted 5,500 new trees in the mountains commencing with Gravata, adding to the precious little ancient forest left.

The Pact for Atlantic Forest Restoration has assembled over 100 businesses, nongovernmental and governmental organizations around the goal of having 15 million hectares of the original ecosystem restored by 2050.

The Pontifícia Universidade Católica do Rio Grande do Sul keeps a private reserve of the Araucaria moist forest ecoregion of approximately 3,100 ha called Pró-Mata, near the city of São Francisco de Paula in the state of Rio Grande do Sul. This reserve is used for research and biodiversity conservation.

== Ecoregions ==
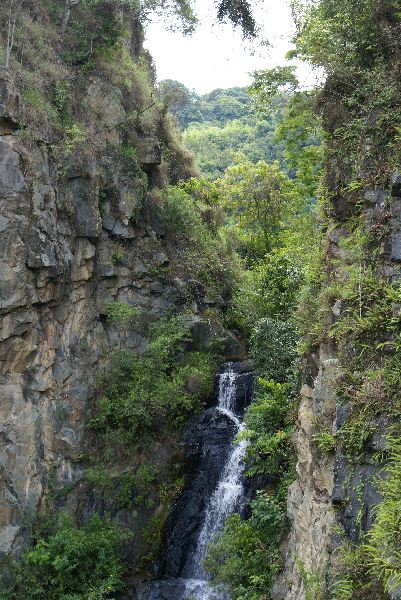
Atlantic forest in Curitiba (Brazil)

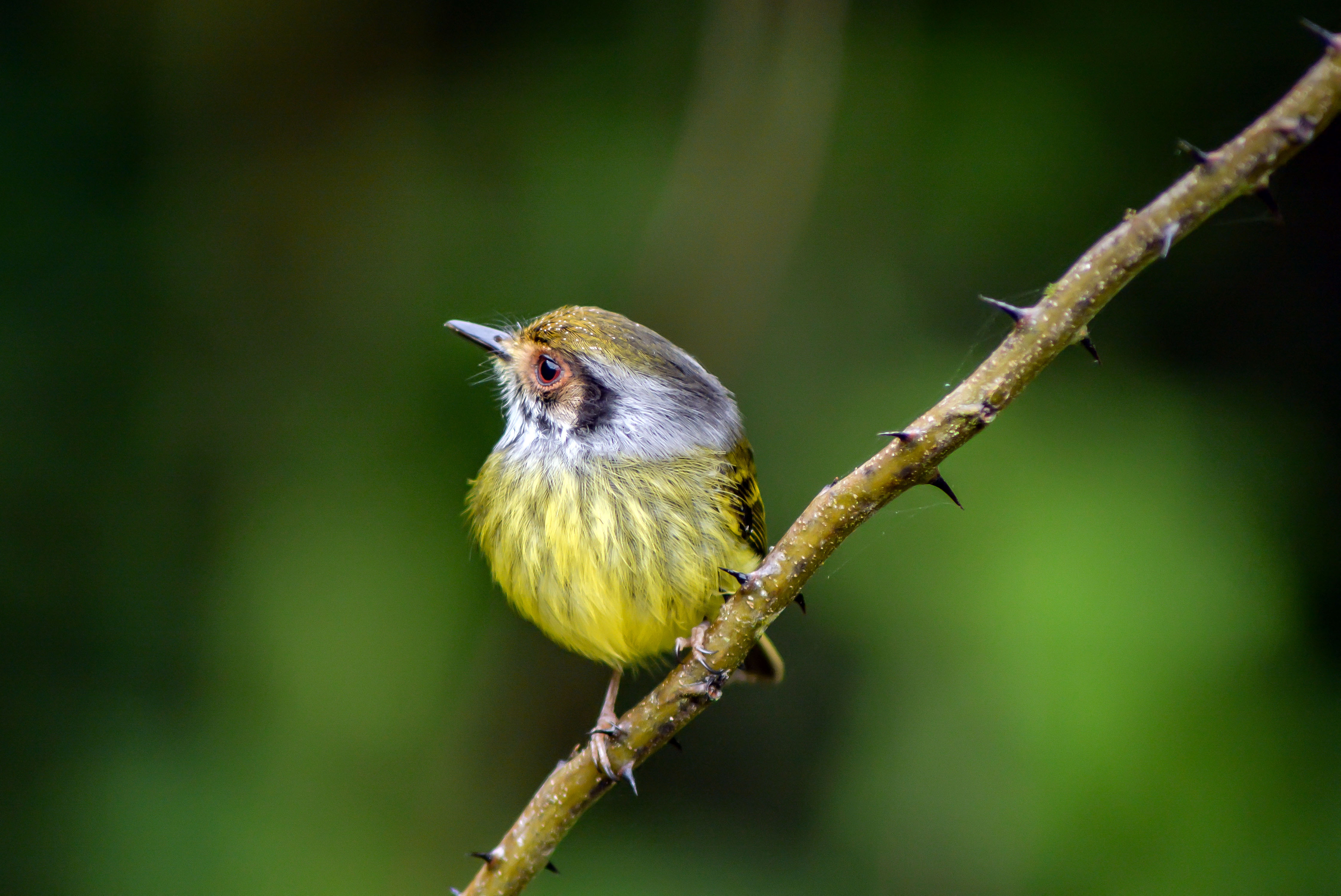
Myiornis auricularis in the Atlantic forest of the state biological reserve of Aguaí

Terrestrial ecoregions within the Atlantic Forest Biome include:

Tropical and subtropical moist broadleaf forests

- Alto Paraná Atlantic forests
- Araucaria moist forests
- Atlantic Coast restingas
- Bahia coastal forests
- Bahia interior forests
- Caatinga enclaves moist forests
- Pernambuco coastal forests
- Pernambuco interior forests
- Serra do Mar coastal forests

Tropical and subtropical dry broadleaf forests

- Atlantic dry forests

Tropical and subtropical grasslands, savannas, and shrublands

- Campos rupestres

Mangrove forests

- Bahia mangroves
- Ilha Grande mangroves
- Rio Piranhas mangroves
- Rio São Francisco mangroves

== See also ==
- Atlantic Forest Biosphere Reserve
- Biodiversity hotspot
- Deforestation in Paraguay
- List of ecoregions in Brazil
- List of plants of Atlantic Forest vegetation of Brazil
- List of Atlantic Forest conservation units

== Bibliography ==
- Saporetti-Junior, Amilcar Walter; Schaefer, Carlos Ernesto G. Reynaud; de Souza, Agostinho Lopes; Soares, Michellia Pereira; Araújo, Dorothy Sue Dunn; Meira-Neto, João Augusto Alves (21 September 2011). "Influence of Soil Physical Properties on Plants of the Mussununga Ecosystem, Brazil". Folia Geobotanica. 47 (1): 29–39. doi:10.1007/s12224-011-9106-9. S2CID 17406247.
