= Bahia coastal forests =

Ecoregion in Brazil

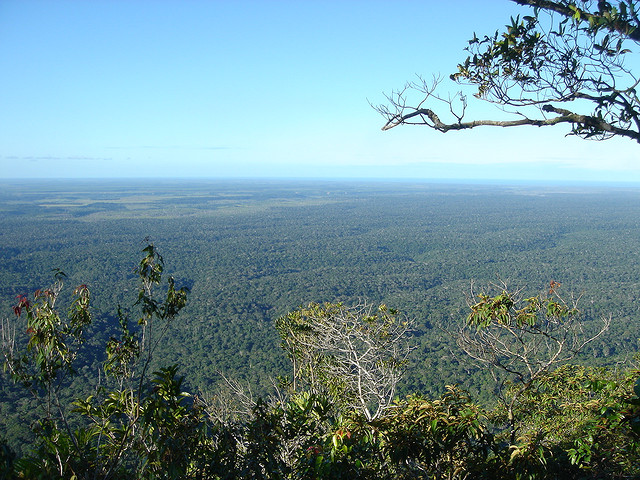
- Monte Pascoal National Park, Bahia, Brazil.

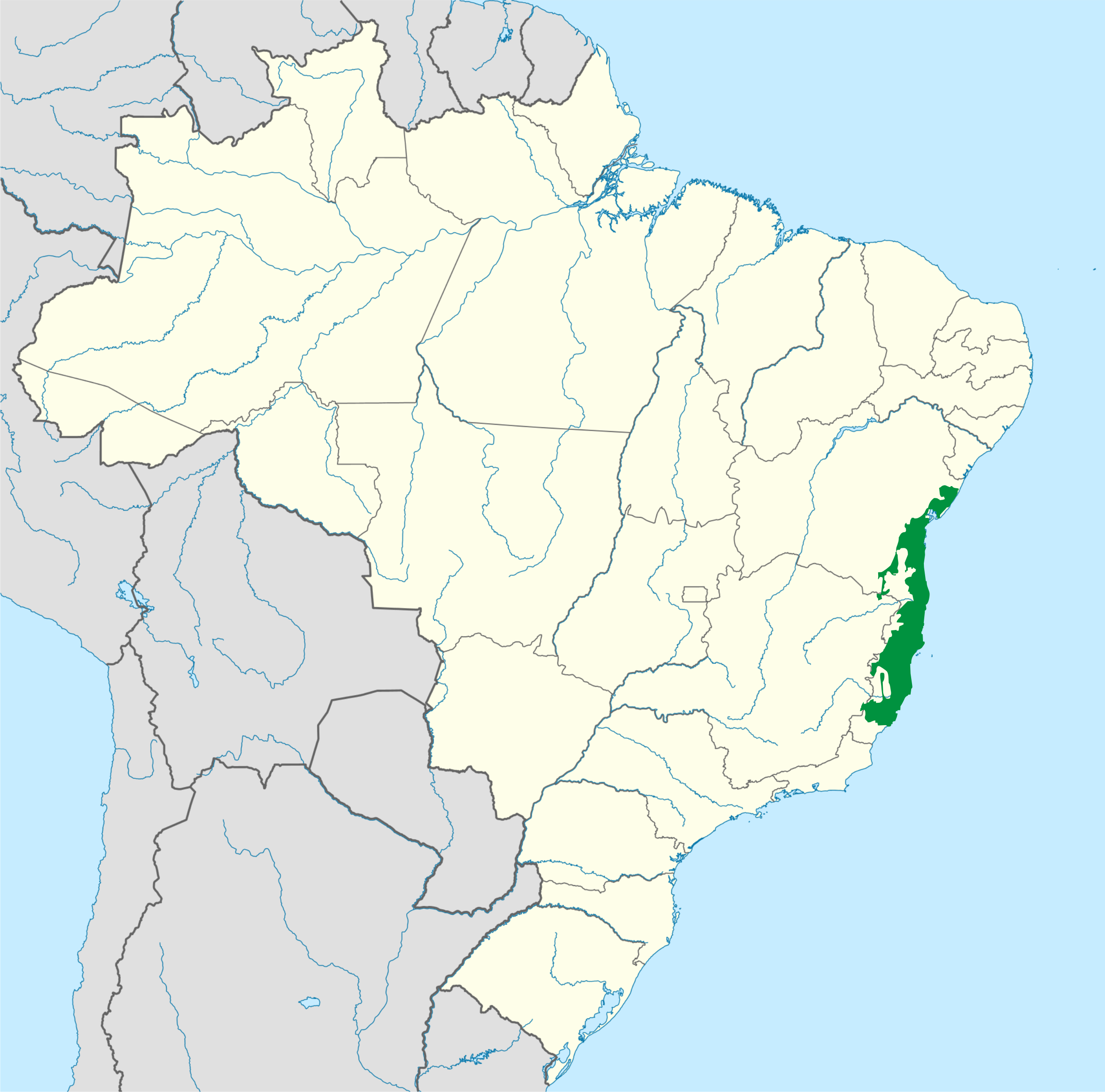
- Localization of Bahia coastal forests ecoregion as delineated by WWF.

Ecology
- Biome: Atlantic Forest
- Borders: Serra do Mar coastal forests; Bahia interior forests; Pernambuco coastal forests
- Bird species: 466
- Mammal species: 166

Geography
- Area: 109,815 km^{2} (42,400 mi^{2})
- Country: Brazil
- States: Bahia; Espírito Santo

Conservation
- Habitat loss: 95.0%
- Protected: 1.78%

The Bahia coastal forests are a tropical moist broadleaf forest ecoregion of eastern Brazil, part of the larger Atlantic Forest region.

== Setting ==
The Bahia coastal forests occupy a belt approximately 150 km (93 mi) wide along the Atlantic coast of eastern Brazil, in the states of Bahia and Espírito Santo. The Itapicuru River forms the northern boundary of the ecoregion, which extends south to near the Itapemirim River. The ecoregion is bounded on the east by the Atlantic Ocean and the enclaves of the Atlantic Coast restingas forests and Bahia mangroves. To the west, the forests transition to the drier Bahia interior forests.

The forests cover Tertiary sedimentary plateaus extending from near the seacoast westward to the lower slopes of the Serra da Mantiqueira. The prevalent soils are tropical nutrient-poor yellow-red latosol and podzols.

=== Climate ===
The ecoregion has a tropical climate with annual rainfall ranging from 1,200 to 1,800 mm, evenly distributed throughout the year. The southern portion of the ecoregion may experience a dry period from May through September.

== Flora ==
The four-tiered Atlantic evergreen moist forests are the predominant vegetation type.

== Fauna ==
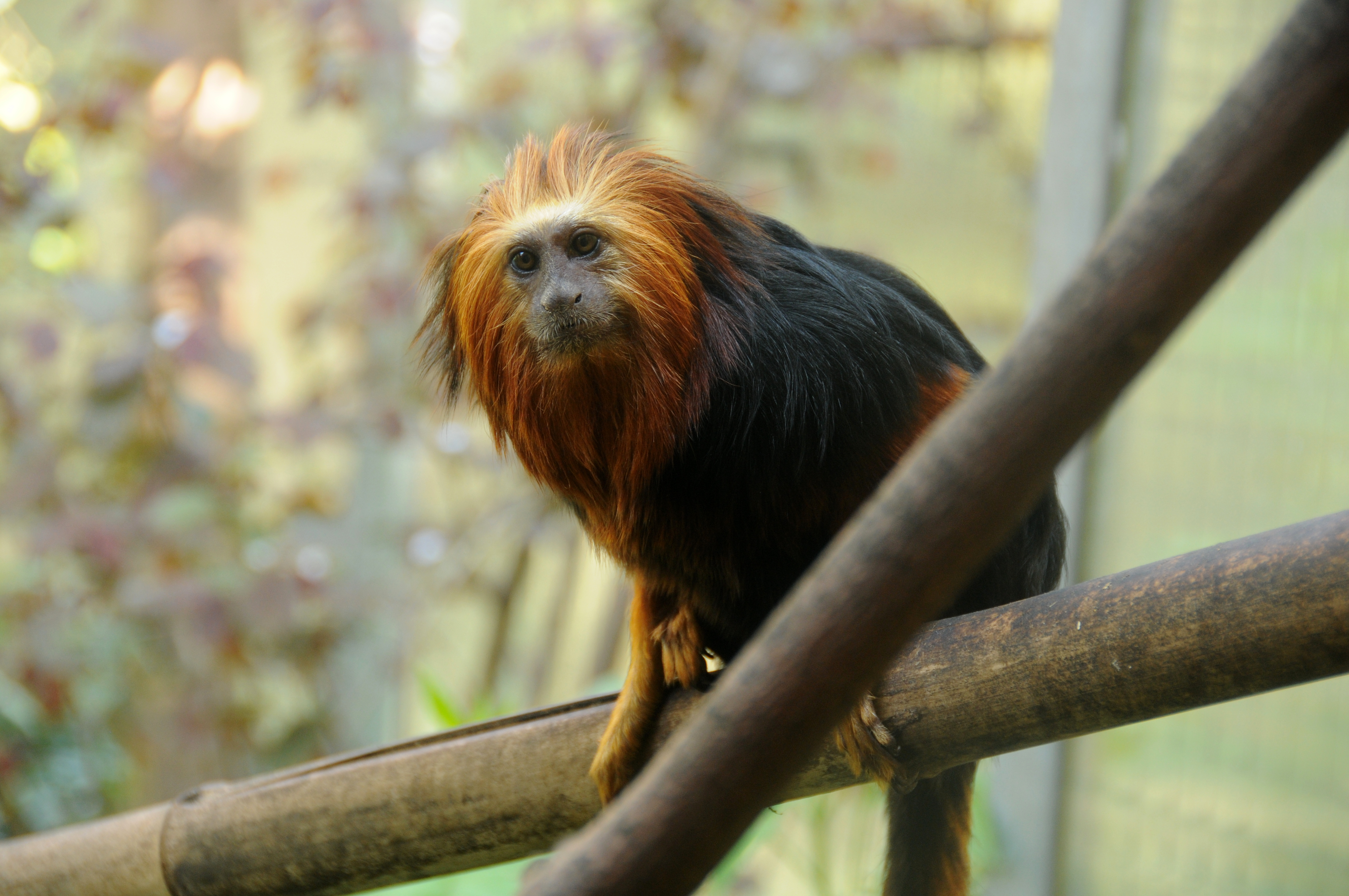
Golden-headed lion tamarin is a primate endemic species of Bahia coastal forests.

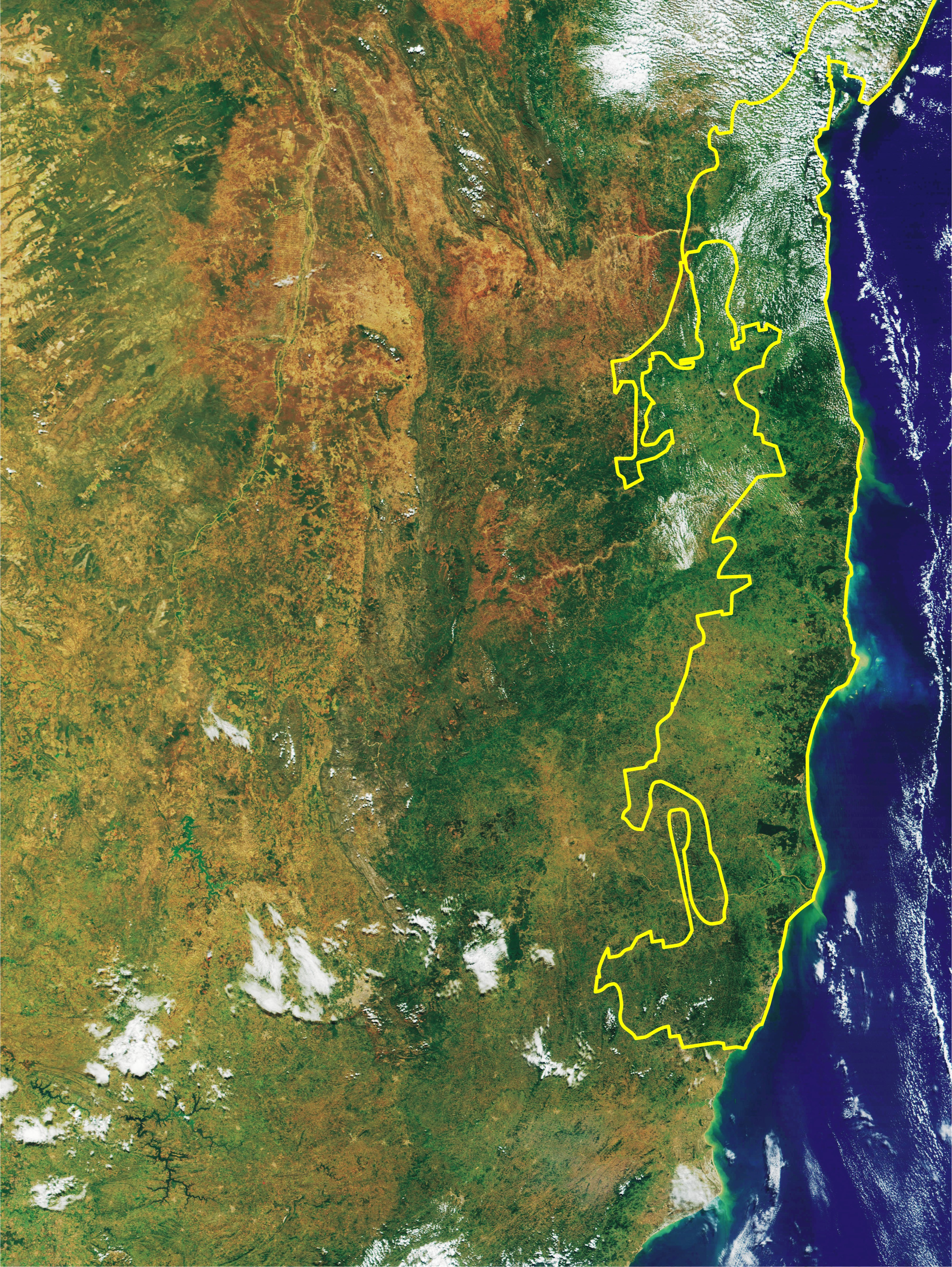
Satellite picture of Bahia coastal forests ecoregion (yellow line). In this image is shown the desforestation degree of the ecoregion.

Endangered mammals in the ecoregion include the maned three-toed sloth (Bradypus torquatus) and golden-headed lion tamarin (Leontopithecus chrysomelas).

== Conservation and threats ==
Less than 5% of the original forest cover remains intact. Protected areas in the ecoregion include Sooretama Biological Reserve and Linhares Forest Reserve.
