= Atlantic Coast restingas =

Ecoregion in Brazil

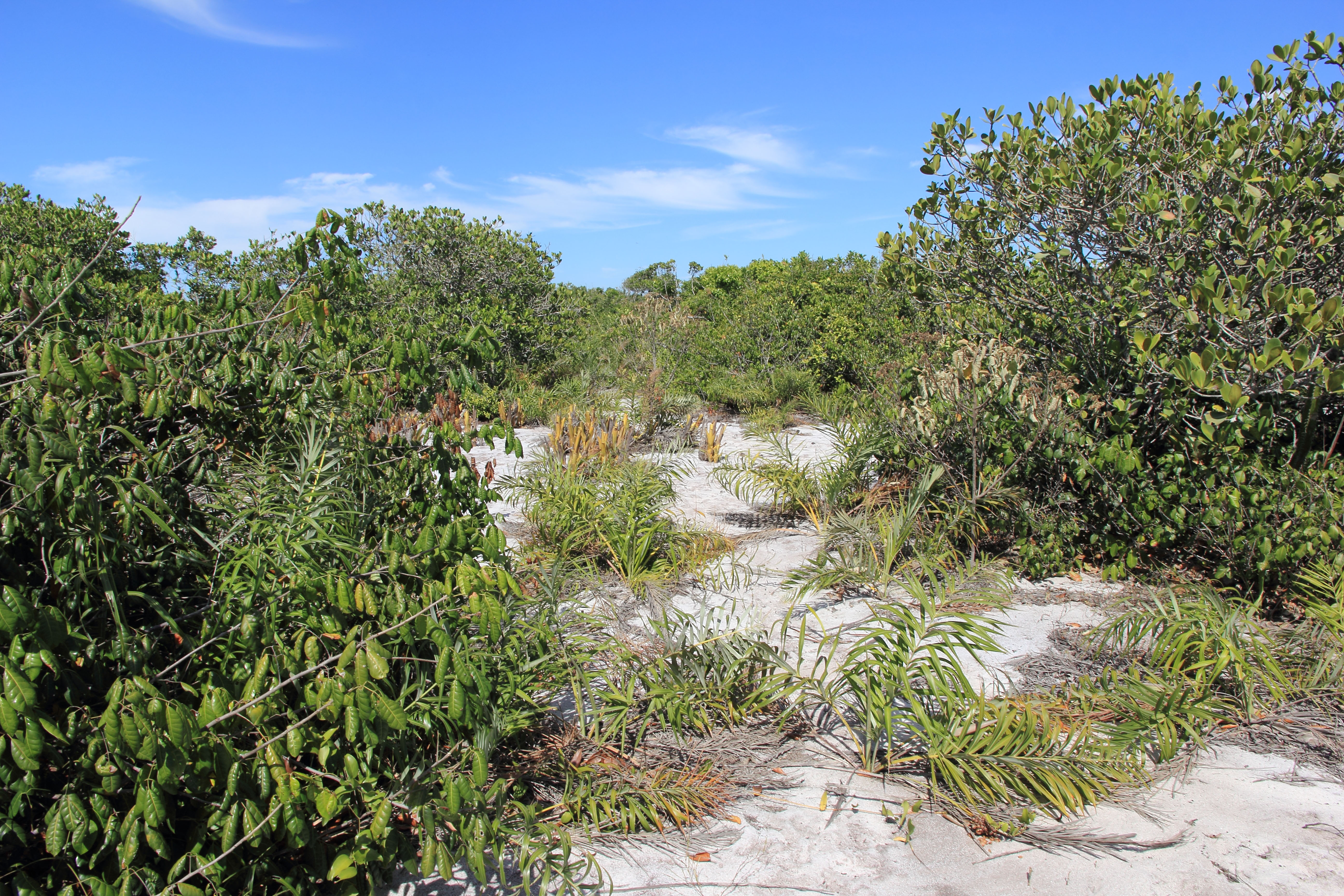
- Restinga vegetation in Jurubatiba Sandbank National Park

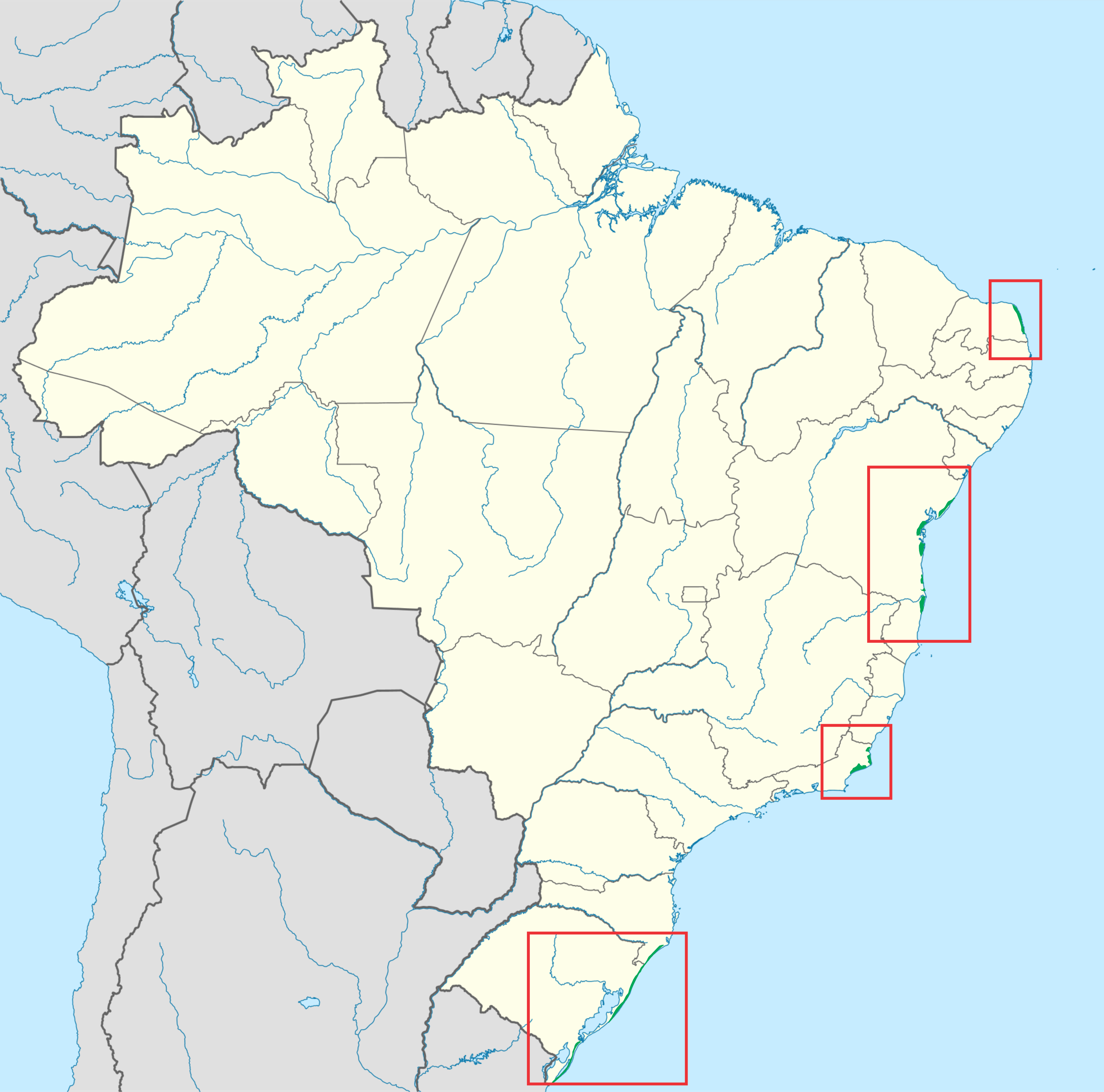
- location of the Atlantic Coast restingas

Ecology
- Realm: Neotropical
- Biome: tropical and subtropical moist broadleaf forests
- Borders: List: Caatinga; Pernambuco coastal forests; Bahia coastal forests; Alto Paraná Atlantic forests; Serra do Mar coastal forests; Uruguayan savanna

Geography
- Area: 7,557 km^{2} (2,918 mi^{2})
- Countries: Brazil
- States: Bahia; Rio de Janeiro; Rio Grande do Norte; Santa Catarina, Rio Grande do Sul

Conservation
- Conservation status: Critical/endangered
- Protected: 1,092 km² (14%)

The Atlantic Coast restingas is an ecoregion of the tropical and subtropical moist broadleaf forests biome, and the South American Atlantic Forest biome. It is located along Brazil's Atlantic coast, from the country's northeast to its southeast.

Restingas are coastal forests which form on sandy, acidic, and nutrient-poor soils, and are characterized by medium-sized trees and shrubs adapted to the dry and nutrient-poor conditions found there.

== Setting ==
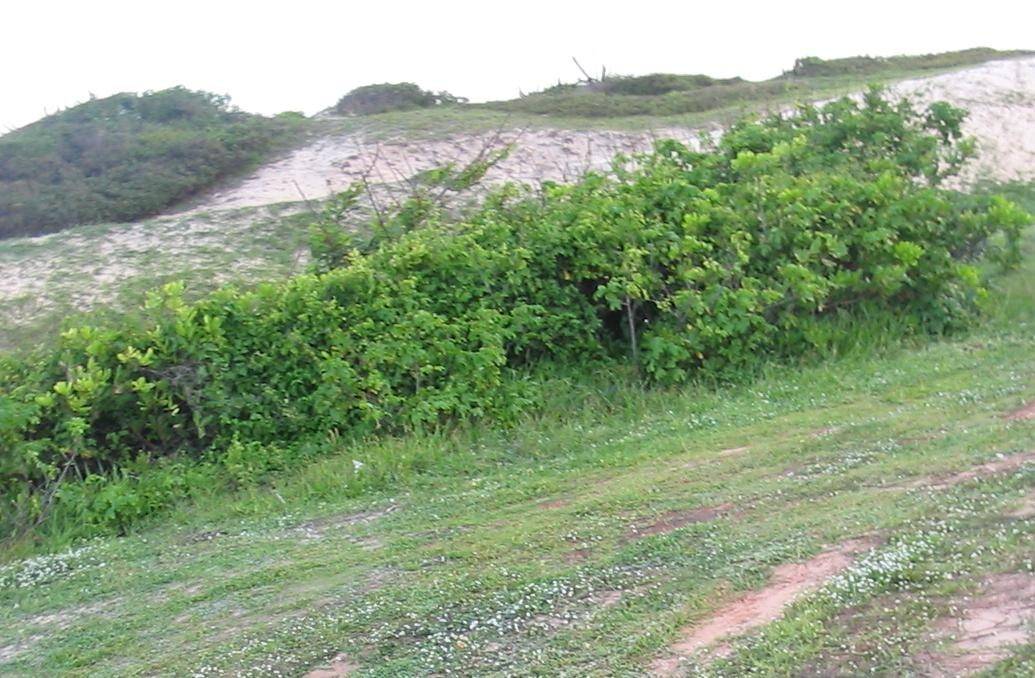
Restinga vegetation in Fortaleza

The ecoregion covers an area of 7,900 square kilometers (3,100 sq mi), and includes several well-defined enclaves that range along the Atlantic coast from Brazil's northeast to southeast, extending from the tropics to the subtropics.

The northernmost enclave is in Rio Grande do Norte state in northeastern Brazil. Other enclaves are north and south of the city of Salvador and near the mouth of the Jequitinhonha River in Bahia state; north and south of the mouth of the Rio Paraíba do Sul in Rio de Janeiro state; and along the coast of southern Santa Catarina state and Rio Grande do Sul state, as far as the Uruguayan border.

== See also ==
- List of plants of Atlantic Forest vegetation of Brazil — flora of its diverse ecoregions.
- Ecoregions in the Atlantic Forest biome
- List of ecoregions in Brazil
