= Atlantic dry forests =

Tropical dry forest ecoregion of the Atlantic Forest Biome

Atlantic Dry Forests (NT0202)
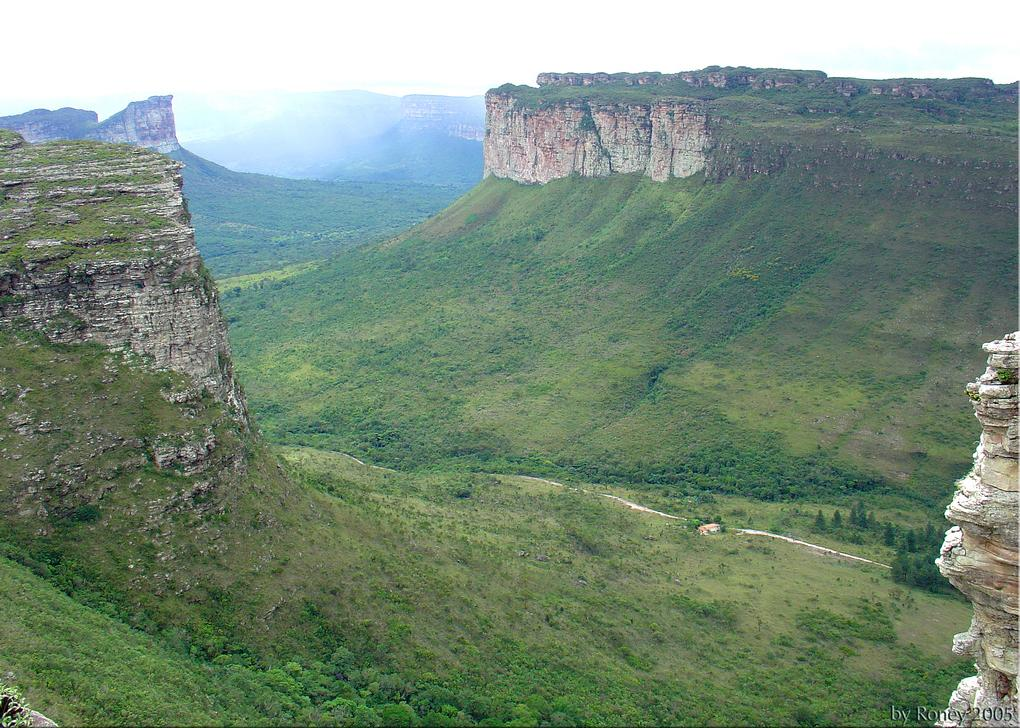
- Dry forest in Chapada Diamantina

- Atlantic dry forests localization as delineated by WWF.

Ecology
- Biome: Atlantic Forest
- Borders: Caatinga; Cerrado
- Bird species: 311
- Mammal species: 147

Geography
- Area: 115,440 km^{2} (44,570 mi^{2})
- Country: Brazil
- States: Bahia; Minas Gerais; Piauí
- Coordinates: 14°S 44°W

Conservation
- Conservation status: Vulnerable
- Habitat loss: 70%

The Atlantic dry forests are a tropical dry forest ecoregion of the Atlantic Forest Biome, located in eastern Brazil.

== Setting ==
The Atlantic dry forests cover an area of 115,100 square kilometers (44,400 sq mi), lying between the Cerrado savannas of central Brazil and the Caatinga dry shrublands of northeastern Brazil. The Atlantic dry forests stretch from northern Minas Gerais state across western Bahia state into central Piauí. The Atlantic dry forests generally lie along the upper São Francisco River of Minas Gerais and Bahia, and in the basin of the Gurguéia River in Piauí. A large enclave of Atlantic dry forest lies on the Chapada Diamantina of east-central Bahia.

== Flora ==
The Atlantic dry forests are dense, with deciduous and semi-deciduous trees reaching up to 25 to 30 meters in height. The Barriguda Tree, Cavanillesia arborea, is a dry forest tree species distinguished by its huge, bottle-shaped trunk which reaches up to 1.5 meters in diameter.

== Fauna and Ecology ==
The Atlantic Dry Forests are home to the critically endangered Barbara Brown’s titi (Callicebus barbarabrownae), a small primate endemic to this ecoregion. Only about 260 individuals remain in the wild, surviving in a few fragmented populations. These agile climbers and jumpers forage for fruit high in the canopy, often collecting it before birds like parrots can access it. The dry forest environment presents unique challenges for arboreal primates, including shorter trees interspersed with shrublands and grasslands, and increased vulnerability to predators during the dry season when trees lose their leaves.

The ecoregion is characterized by dense tropical dry forests, predominantly deciduous or semi-deciduous, with trees reaching heights of 25 to 30 meters. Prominent tree species include Cavanillesia arborea (Barriguda Tree), Brazilian cedarwood, Araracanga, and Tabebuia species. Cavanillesia arborea is notable for its large bottle-shaped trunk exceeding 1.5 meters in diameter. Patches of Cerrado and Caatinga vegetation are also found where soils and topography permit. Additionally, limestone caves scattered across the landscape harbor specialized and unique cave biota.

The climate is tropical with a distinct dry season lasting about five months, and annual rainfall ranging from 850 to 1,000 mm. The terrain is predominantly flat with occasional relict hills, largely developed on eutrophic soils derived from Bambuí limestone.

Although biodiversity in the Atlantic Dry Forests is still not fully documented, the presence of endemic bird species suggests significant endemism across other biological groups. Migratory birds play an important role in the ecoregion’s dynamics, with at least 20 species migrating north during the dry season and returning to breed during the wet season. Notable threatened birds include the hyacinth macaw (Anodorhynchus hyacinthinus), vinaceous-breasted amazon (Amazona vinacea), golden-capped parakeet (Aratinga auricapillus), moustached woodcreeper (Xiphocolaptes falcirostris), great xenops (Megaxenops parnaguae), and Minas Gerais tyrannulet (Phylloscartes roquettei).

Currently, approximately 70% of the original forest cover has been lost, primarily due to agricultural expansion and charcoal production for Brazil’s steel and pig iron industries. The most diverse forests, especially those on rich flat soils, have been almost entirely removed. Remaining large forest fragments are largely confined to the slopes of plateaus, while the central portion of the ecoregion between Manga (Minas Gerais) and Ibotirama (Bahia) remains largely unprotected. Protected areas include Peruaçu and Serra das Confusões, located at the edges of the ecoregion.

Priority conservation actions for the next decade include expanding protected areas, especially in the core region; limiting further land conversion for agriculture; and restoring dry forests on flat terrains where they historically occurred.
