= Pernambuco coastal forests =

Ecoregion in Brazil

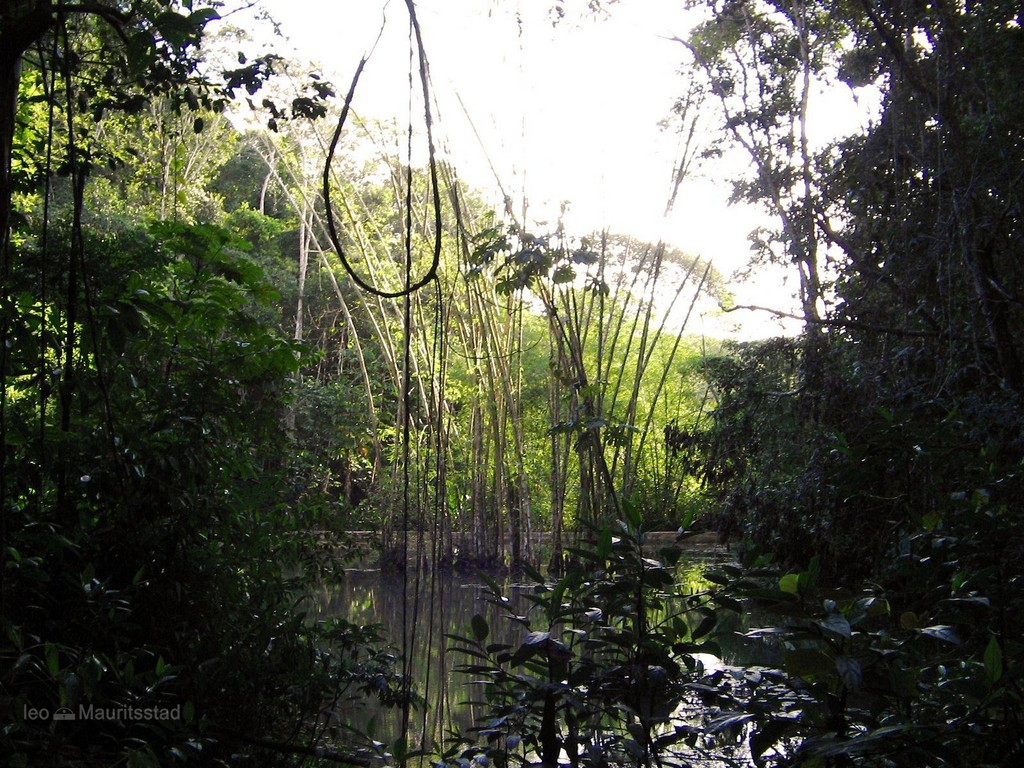
- Forest near Recife, Brazil.

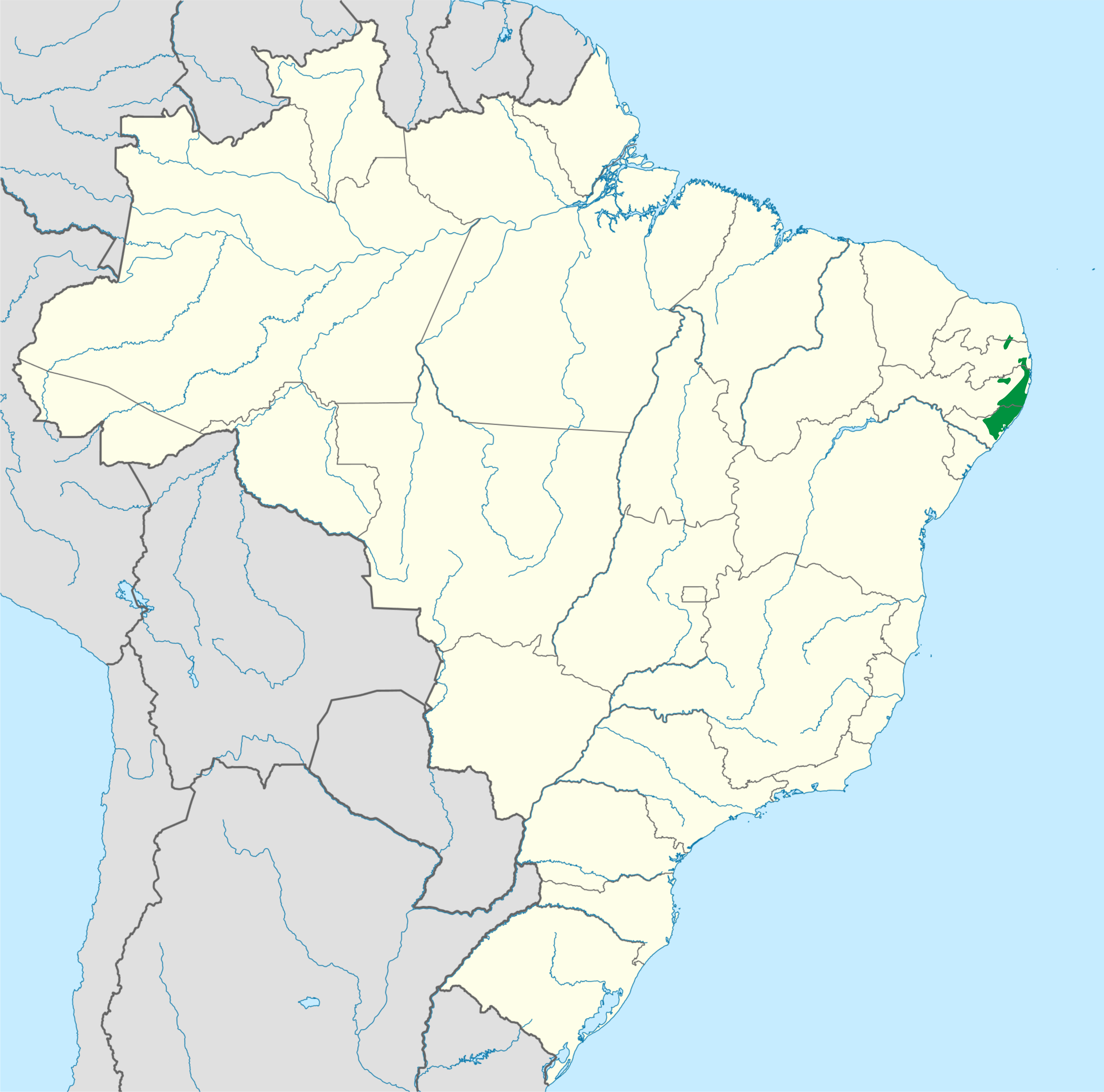

Ecology
- Biome: Atlantic Forest
- Borders: Pernambuco interior forests; Southern Atlantic mangroves; Caatinga
- Bird species: 407
- Mammal species: 122

Geography
- Area: 17,612 km^{2} (6,800 mi^{2})
- Country: Brazil
- States: Pernambuco; Alagoas; Paraíba
- Rivers: Beberibe River, Capibaribe River, Goiana River, Jaboatão River, Paraíba do Norte River, Tejipió River

Conservation
- Conservation status: Critical/Endangered
- Habitat loss: 96%
- Protected: 0.49%

The Pernambuco coastal forests are an ecoregion of the Tropical moist broadleaf forests biome, and the South American Atlantic Forest biome. It is located in northeastern Brazil.

== Geography ==
The Pernambuco coastal forests occupy an 80 km-wide strip along the Atlantic coast of northeastern Brazil in the states of Pernambuco and Alagoas. The forests extend from near sea level to 600–800 metres (2,000–2,600 ft) in elevation, on the windward slopes of the Borborema Plateau.

The Goiana River of Pernambuco marks the forests' northern extent, and the Mundaú River of Alagoas the southern extent.

The ecoregion is bounded on the east by the Atlantic Ocean and the coastal Atlantic Coast restingas forests and Rio Piranhas mangroves. To the east, the forests transition to the drier Pernambuco interior forests and Caatinga.

=== Climate ===
The ecoregion has a tropical climate with annual rainfall ranging from 1,750 to 2,000 mm. There is a dry period from October through January.

== Natural history ==
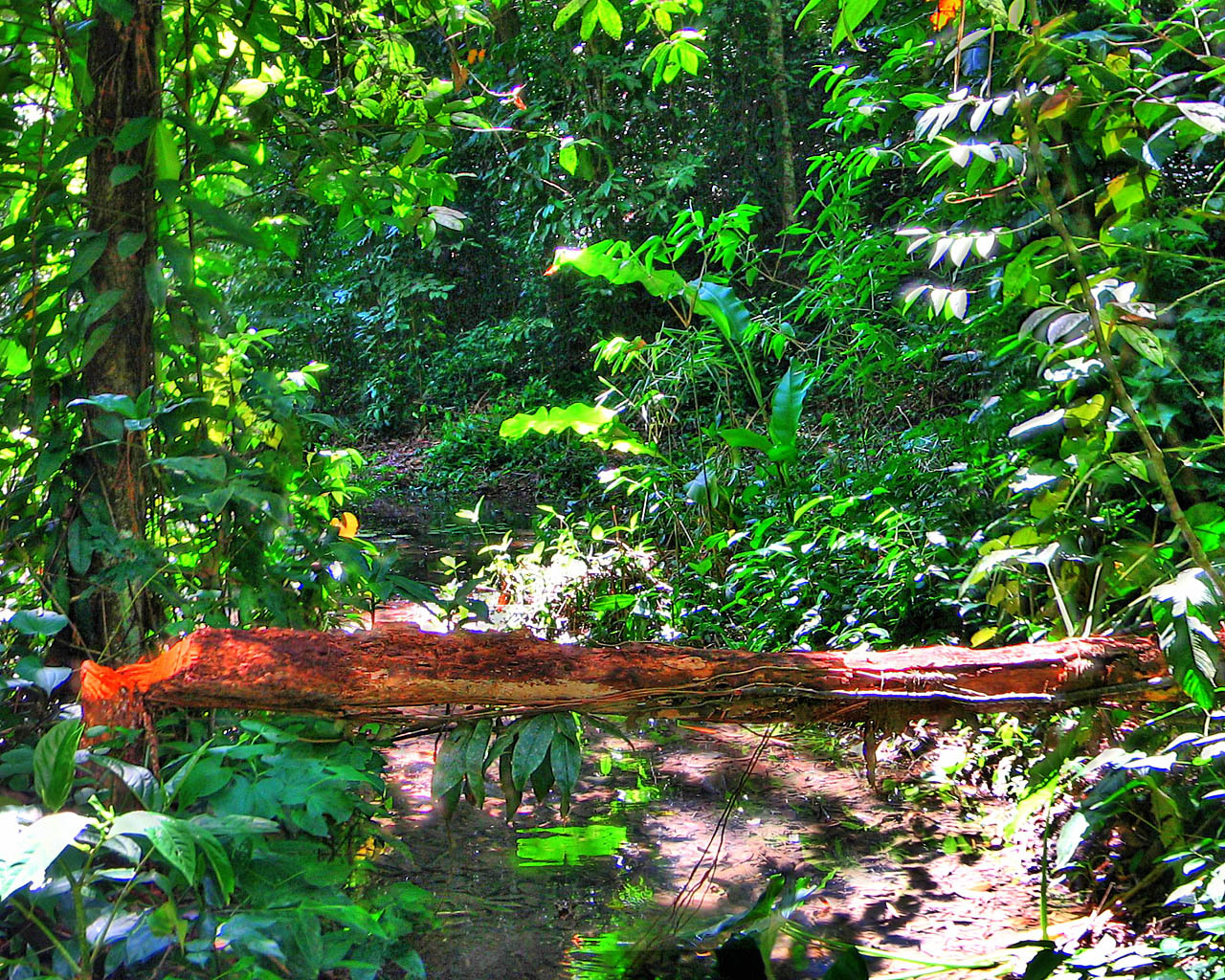
Pernambuco coastal forest habitat, in Camaragibe.

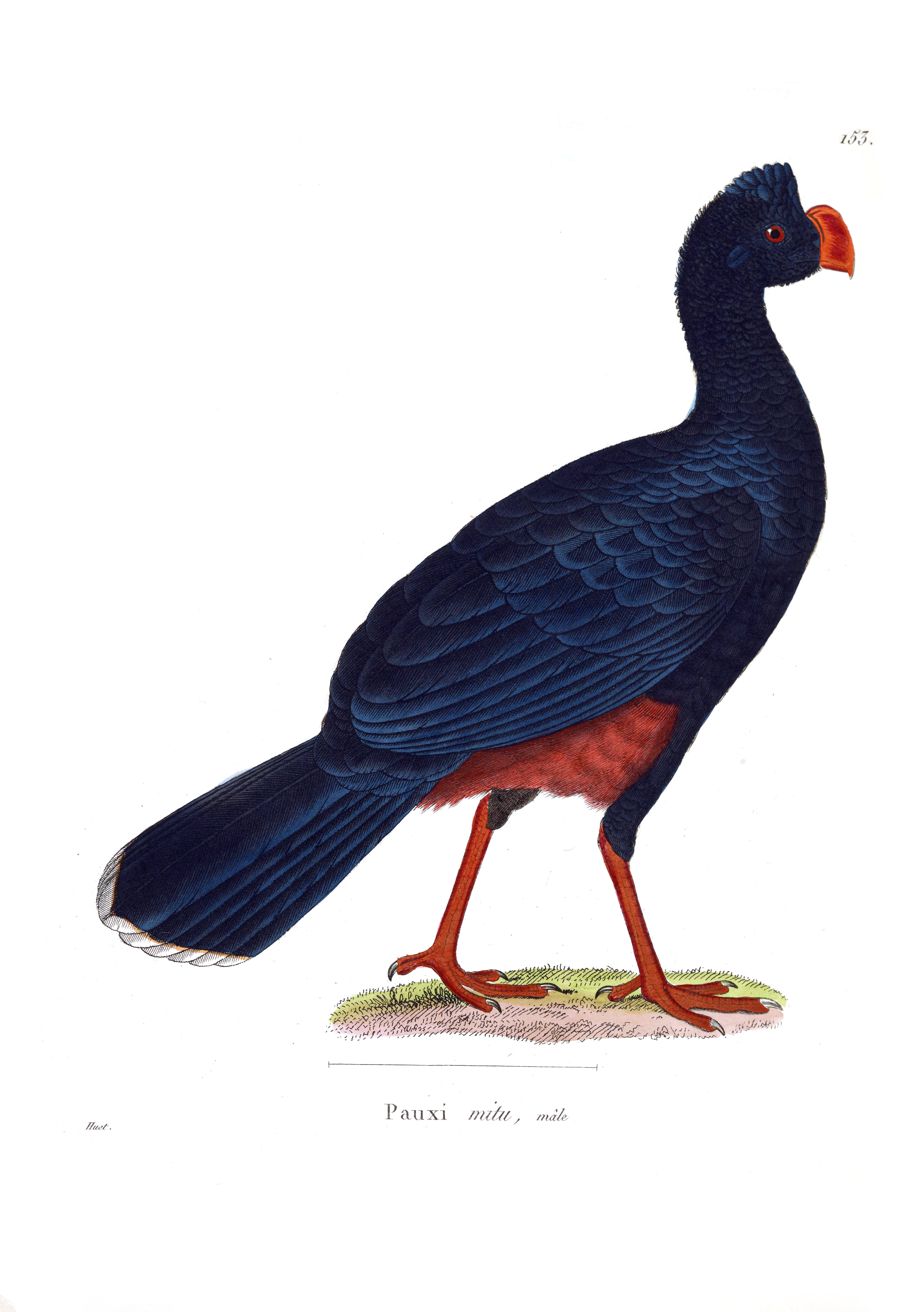
Alagoas curassow, an extinct in wild species of the forest in Alagoas.

=== Flora ===
The four-tiered evergreen Atlantic moist forests are the predominant vegetation type.

=== Fauna ===
The ecoregion is an endemic bird area that harbors 13 threatened species of birds. It also harbors the last populations of the red-handed howler monkey (Alouatta belzebul) and blond capuchin (Sapajus flavius) in the Atlantic Forests.

== Conservation and threats ==
Coastal forests in Pernambuco have a long history of deforestation. The first cycle of destruction was due to "Pau-brasil" (Caesalpinia echinata) extraction. After the extraction of Pau-brasil, through the mid-20th century, the sugarcane industry was mainly responsible for the forest clearing.

Forests remnants are small, most with less 10 km^{2} and surrounded by sugarcane fields. There is only 87 km^{2} of isolated conservation units. It isn't an enough amount to maintain biodiversity and key ecological processes. The largest reserve is Murici Ecological Station (6132 ha).

== See also ==
- Ecoregions in the Atlantic Forest biome
- Pernambuco interior forests
- List of plants of Atlantic Forest vegetation of Brazil — flora of its diverse ecoregions.
- List of ecoregions in Brazil
