= Brazilian jurisdictional waters =

Brazil's territorial sea, EEZ and continental shelf

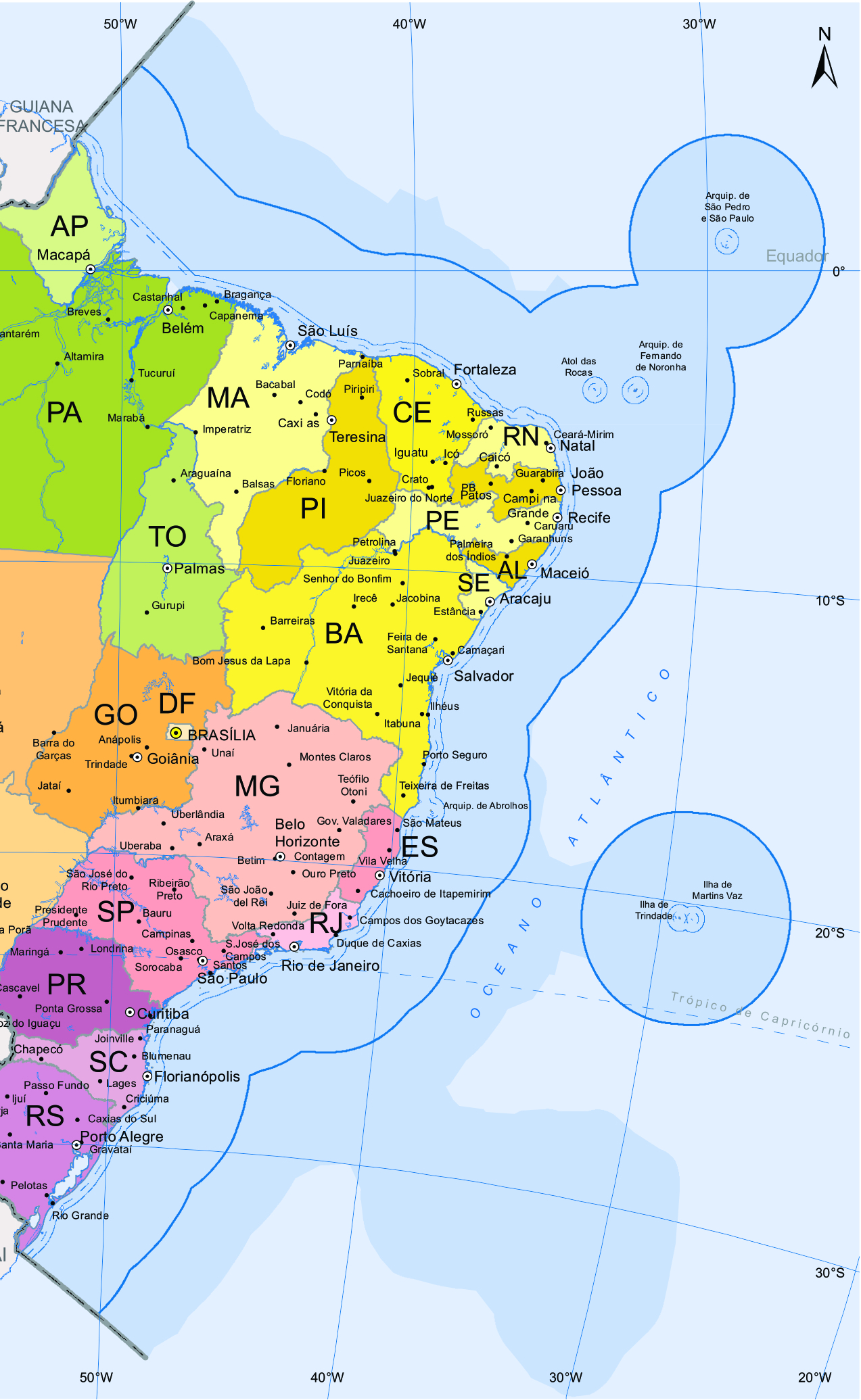
Map of Brazil in the 2024 School Atlas, including the EEZ (within the dark blue border) and the extended continental shelf proposals (shaded in a darker blue without a border)

Brazilian jurisdictional waters (Portuguese: águas jurisdicionais brasileiras, AJB) are the riverine and oceanic spaces over which Brazil exerts some degree of jurisdiction over activities, persons, installations and natural resources. They comprise internal waters, the territorial sea and exclusive economic zone (EEZ), to a distance of 200 nautical miles (370 kilometres) from baselines along the coast, as well as waters overlying the extended continental shelf, where Brazilian claims of jurisdiction are controversial, as the water column over this stretch of seabed is part of the high seas. The continental shelf of Brazil is under a different legal regime from its overlying waters. The Brazilian Navy covers both the shelf and the waters in its less formal concept of a "Blue Amazon".

The AJB's total claimed area stands at 5,669,852.41 km² (equivalent to 67% of land territory), of which 2,094,656.59 km² are above the extended shelf. These maritime zones are based on the United Nations Convention on the Law of the Sea (UNCLOS). From 1970 until it came into effect in 1994, Brazil had claimed a territorial sea as far as 200 nautical miles from the coast, instead of the present 12, but retains rights over natural resources in this area through its EEZ. Its coastline is the longest in the South Atlantic Ocean, but only three archipelagos contribute to its EEZ: Fernando de Noronha, Trindade and Martim Vaz and Saint Peter and Saint Paul.

Brazil's marine ecosystem is hydrographically and topographically complex and exhibits high rates of endemism and an economic potential in biotechnology. The two prevailing ocean currents, Brazil and North Brazil, have warm, nutrient-poor waters sustaining relatively low biomasses for each species, with a correspondingly limited fishing potential. In winter, cold waters of the Falkland Current may reach as far as the 24th parallel south and cold fronts and extratropical cyclones bring rough seas. The wind, waves, tides and thermal and osmotic gradients offer untouched potentials for renewable energy generation. 26.4% of the EEZ was under protected areas in 2021, mostly around the remote archipelagos of Saint Peter and Saint Paul and Trindade and Martin Vaz. Both are only populated by researchers and military personnel, which is one of the reasons for the government's marine science programs.

Most of the country's population lives near the coast and most of its international trade is conducted through the sea, but local shipbuilding and the national merchant marine have little presence in this trade. Coastal shipping answers a modest share of internal trade and mostly covers the oil and natural gas sector. There is no official measurement of the Brazilian maritime economy; 2015 estimates placed it at 2.67% of the gross domestic product directly tied to the sea, mostly in the tourism-dominated service sector. Coast guard duties in jurisdictional waters are assigned to the Navy.

== Definition ==
=== International law ===
Diagram of UNCLOS maritime zones

Brazilian regulation on maritime spaces follows UNCLOS, a codification of international maritime law which came into force in 1994. This Convention, ratified by 168 states as of 2022, unifies centuries of rulemaking on interstate disputes over control of the seas. It organizes the sea off the coast of sovereign states in multiple zones: the territorial sea, contiguous zone, exclusive economic zone and continental shelf. Distances are measured in nautical miles from baselines along the coast. There are two kinds of baseline: normal lines, which follow the low-water line as plotted on official charts, or straight lines where the coast is too jagged or island-strewn.

The territorial sea extends up to 12 nautical miles (22 kilometres) from baselines and grants coastal states sovereignty over the airspace, water column, seabed and subsoil. Each of these spaces is treated separately in the other maritime zones. In the contiguous zone, at 12 to 24 miles from baselines, a coastal state does not have full sovereignty, but may take measures to prevent or repress unlawful activities in its territory or territorial sea. The contiguous zone is part of the EEZ, which has a width of 188 miles, from the limit of the territorial sea until a distance of 200 nmi (370 km) from baselines. This area gives a coastal state jurisdiction over the exploitation, conservation and management of its waters, seabed and subsoil. The high seas begin at the EEZ's outer limit.

The continental shelf as defined in international law is distinct from the geological continental shelf and consists in an area of seabed and its subsoil, excluding the overlying water column, over which a coastal state has sovereign rights over its natural resources. It extends "to the outer edge of the continental margin, or to a distance of 200 nautical miles from the baselines", as defined in the UNCLOS. If a coastal state's continental margin extends beyond 200 nmi, it may propose an extended continental shelf to the Commission on the Limits of the Continental Shelf (CLCS), an international organ created by the UNCLOS. (Note: The 2012 National Defense White Paper mistakenly claims coastal states may request an extension of the EEZ to 350 miles, which is one of the criteria for the maximum extent of the continental shelf.)

=== Brazilian law ===
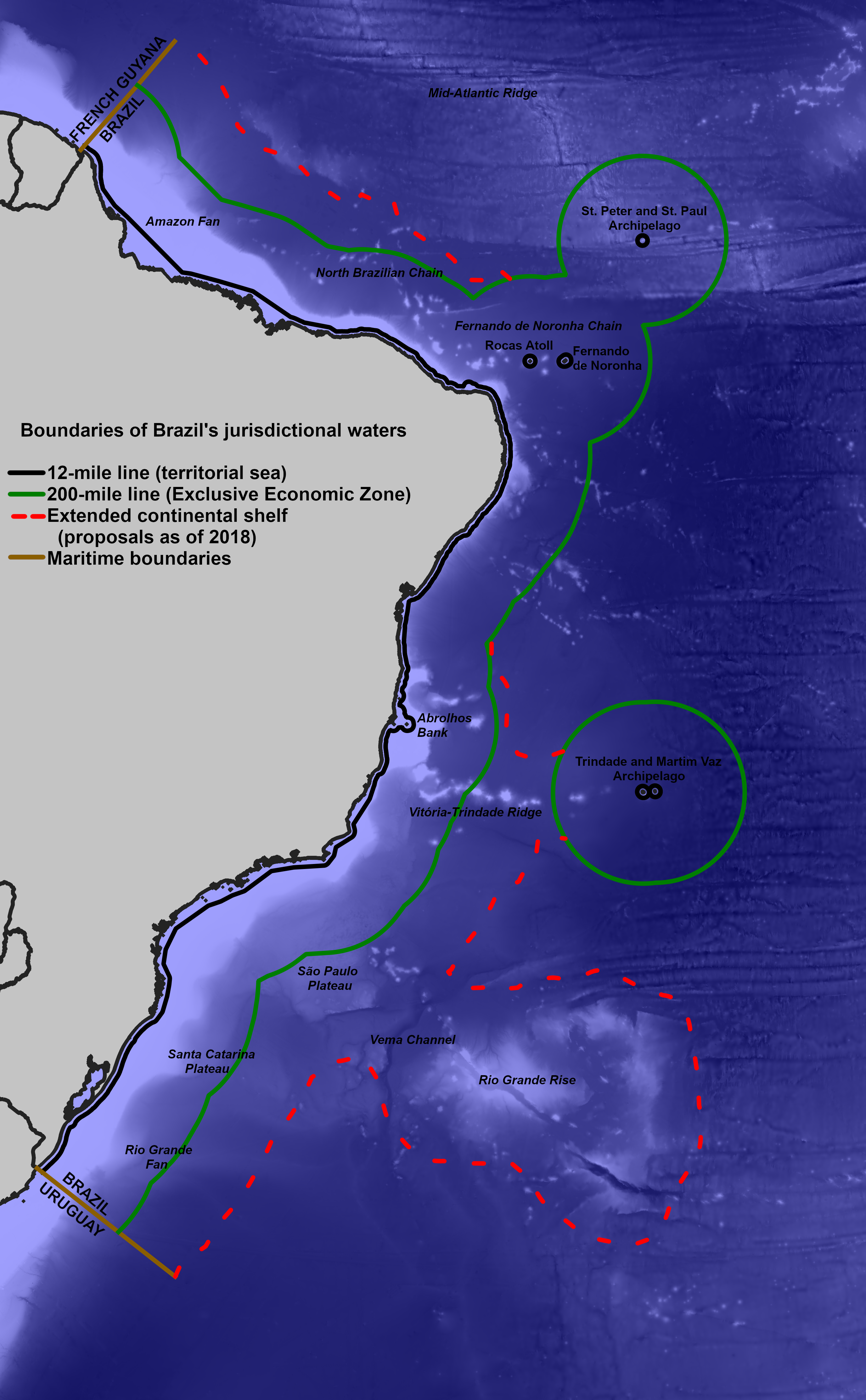
Boundaries of Brazil's jurisdictional waters, including the latest continental shelf claims

The term "Brazilian jurisdictional waters" (águas jurisdicionais brasileiras, AJB) exists in legislation since 1941 at the earliest, although it was less common than "Brazilian waters", "waters of the territorial sea" or "territorial waters". The territorial sea has had a legal definition since 1850, an exclusive fishing regime since 1938, a continental shelf since 1950, and a contiguous zone since 1966. An extended continental shelf was first proposed in 2004 and the country has yet to reach a full understanding with the CLCS to make its claims final and binding.

Law no. 8,617 of January 4, 1993 defined Brazil's maritime zones according to the UNCLOS definitions, and Decree no. 1,530 of June 22, 1995 reproduced the convention's text, making it enforceable within the country. When ratifying the convention, Brazil also announced any foreign military operations within its EEZ must be notified in advance. The concept of AJB was becoming commonplace in legislation since a 1987 law on the prohibition of whaling within the AJB. Other legislative acts used expressions such as "waters under Brazilian jurisdiction", "waters under national jurisdiction" and "Brazilian jurisdictional marine waters", but the Navy took a liking to AJB. This term was used for many years without an explicit definition until the Maritime Authority's Norms for the Operation of Foreign Waters in Brazilian Jurisdictional Waters (Normas da Autoridade Marítima para Operação de Embarcações Estrangeiras em Águas Jurisdicionais Brasileiras – NORMAM-04/2001 (Ordinance 61/DPC, September 22, 2001):

Brazilian jurisdictional waters (AJB) are, as follows: a) maritime waters covering a strip twelve nautical miles in width, measured from the low-water line of the Brazilian continental and insular coastline, as indicated in large-scale nautical charts officially recognized in Brazil, and which constitute the Territorial Sea; b) maritime waters covering a strip which extends from twelve to two hundred nautical miles, counted from the baselines on which the Territorial Sea is measured, which comprise the Exclusive Economic Zone; c) waters overlying the Continental Shelf when it exceeds the limits of the Exclusive Economic Zone; and d) internal waters, comprising internal waterways, considered as rivers, lakes, canals, lagoons, bays, bights and maritime areas deemed to be sheltered" (Note: "São águas jurisdicionais brasileiras (AJB): a) as águas marítimas abrangidas por uma faixa de doze milhas marítimas de largura, medidas a partir da linha de baixa-mar do litoral continental e insular brasileiro, tal como indicada nas cartas náuticas de grande escala, reconhecidas oficialmente no Brasil, e que constituem o Mar Territorial (MT); b) as águas marítimas abrangidas por uma faixa que se estende das doze às duzentas milhas marítimas, contadas a partir das linhas de base que servem para medir o Mar Territorial, que constituem a Zona Econômica Exclusiva (ZEE); c) as águas sobrejacentes à Plataforma Continental quando esta ultrapassar os limites da Zona Econômica Exclusiva; e, d) as águas interiores, compostas das hidrovias interiores, assim consideradas rios, lagos, canais, lagoas, baías, angras e áreas marítimas consideradas abrigadas")

The Navy has the jurisdiction to complete and expound on the gaps in national maritime legislation, and therefore, definitions given in its norms prevail over others. (Note: The 2012 National Defense White Paper contradicts itself in defining Brazil's maritime areas up to a limit of 200 nautical miles, excluding the extended continental shelf, at the same time as it cites an area in square kilometers equivalent to the EEZ plus the extended shelf. The 2016–2019 9th Sectorial Plan for Marine Resources (IX Plano Setorial para os Recursos do Mar) contradicts the NORMAM definitions by excluding jurisdictional claims over the extended continental shelf. Other documents do not repeat this definition and its authority is below that of the Navy Command's.) Matching definitions have been given in other editions of the NORMAM and in the 2014 Navy Basic Doctrine, which further established that the AJB cannot be considered part of the high seas. Presidential decrees and the National Defense White Paper, which was ratified by Congress in 2018, have accepted the Navy's definition.

Brazilian law regulates maritime traffic, environmental conservation, natural resource exploitation and scientific research in the AJB. Internal waters and the territorial sea are its only components which are part of Brazil's territory, where the state exerts full sovereignty. The EEZ and continental shelf merely offer sovereign rights over natural resources. Therefore the expression "Brazilian maritime territory", which some authors used for the totality of Brazilian maritime zones, is misleading.

==== Waters overlying the extended continental shelf ====
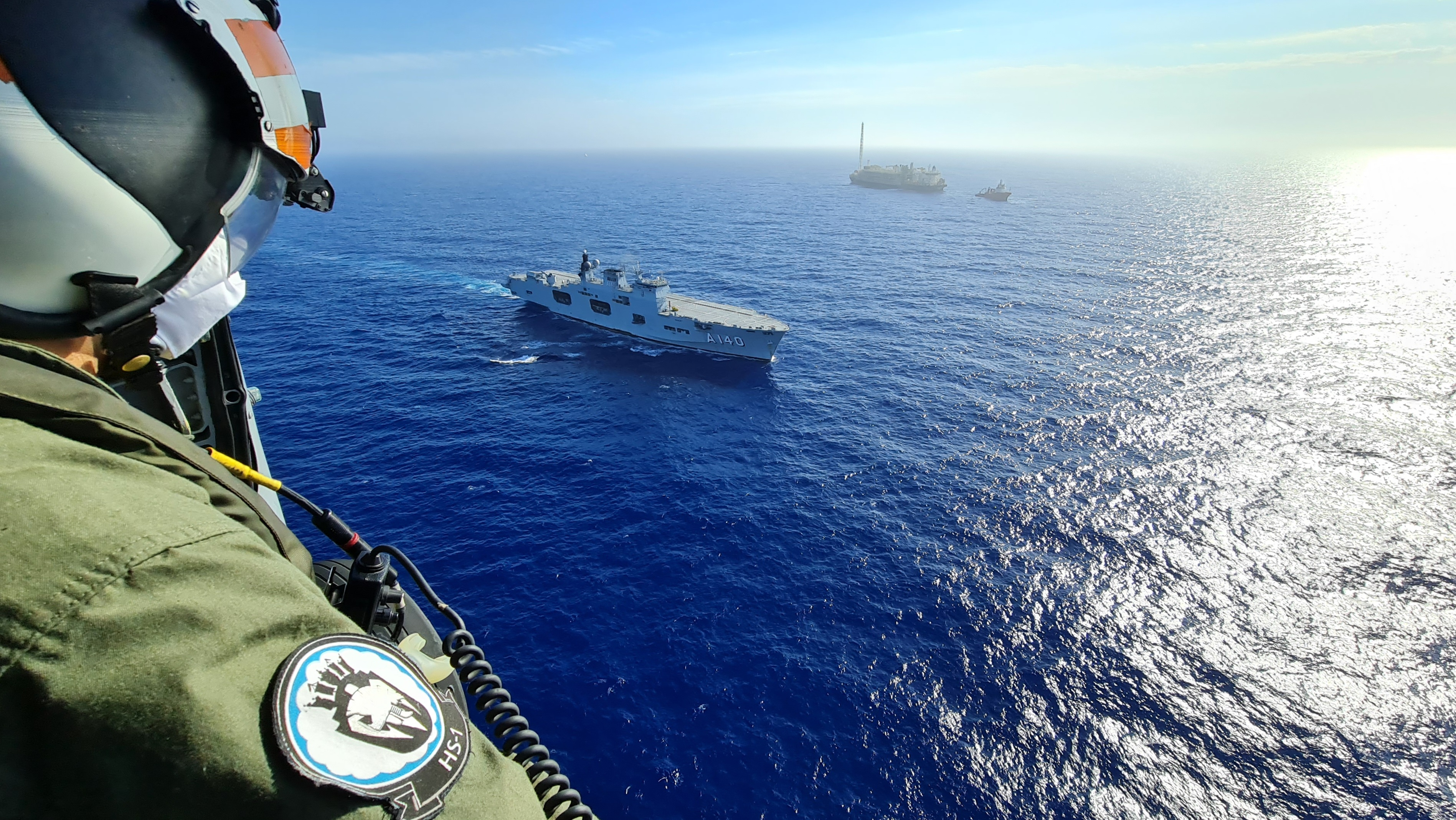
Naval Aviation helicopter overflies NAM Atlântico and civilian vessels in the Santos Basin

Some legal scholars have criticized the Brazilian state's claim of jurisdiction over the water column overlying its extended continental shelf. Beyond 200 nmi, the water column is part of the high seas, even when its underlying seabed belongs to a state's continental shelf. At the International Journal of Marine and Coastal Law, Alexandre Pereira Silva summarized in 2020 that the concept of AJB is incompatible with the UNCLOS and infringes on the freedom of the high seas. Tiago V. Zanella, an author on maritime law, does not dismiss the concept's "enormous strategic importance" for the country, but considers that to speak of jurisdictional rights over this area is to perform an "undue appropriation of a zone that is 'open to all states'".

In the hypothetical case of a foreign whaling vessel in the waters overlying the extended continental shelf, over 200 nmi from coastal baselines, Brazilian law would require the Navy to impede this vessel's illegal activities in the AJB. The vessel's owners could resort to an international court, such as the International Court of Justice or the International Tribunal for the Law of the Sea, which would rule in their favor. As a party to the UNCLOS, Brazil would have to comply with this ruling.

Naval officer Alexander Neves de Assumpção, in his thesis for the Naval War College, concedes there is a risk of naval commanders being led to infringe on international treaties ratified by Brazil. Nonetheless, he contended that "the concept of AJB need not be changed", as it is already moderated in legislation by the expressions "jurisdiction, to some degree", "for the purposes of control and oversight" and "within the limits of national and international law". To oversee exploitation of the seafloor, Brazil would still have a limited jurisdiction, not to be conflated with sovereignty, over its overlying waters, even when they lie in the high seas. No country has contested Brazil's definition, and Argentina and Chile have likewise claimed jurisdictions beyond what was given in the UNCLOS. What remained to be done was to draft norms clarifying which kinds of oversight are allowed.

=== Blue Amazon ===
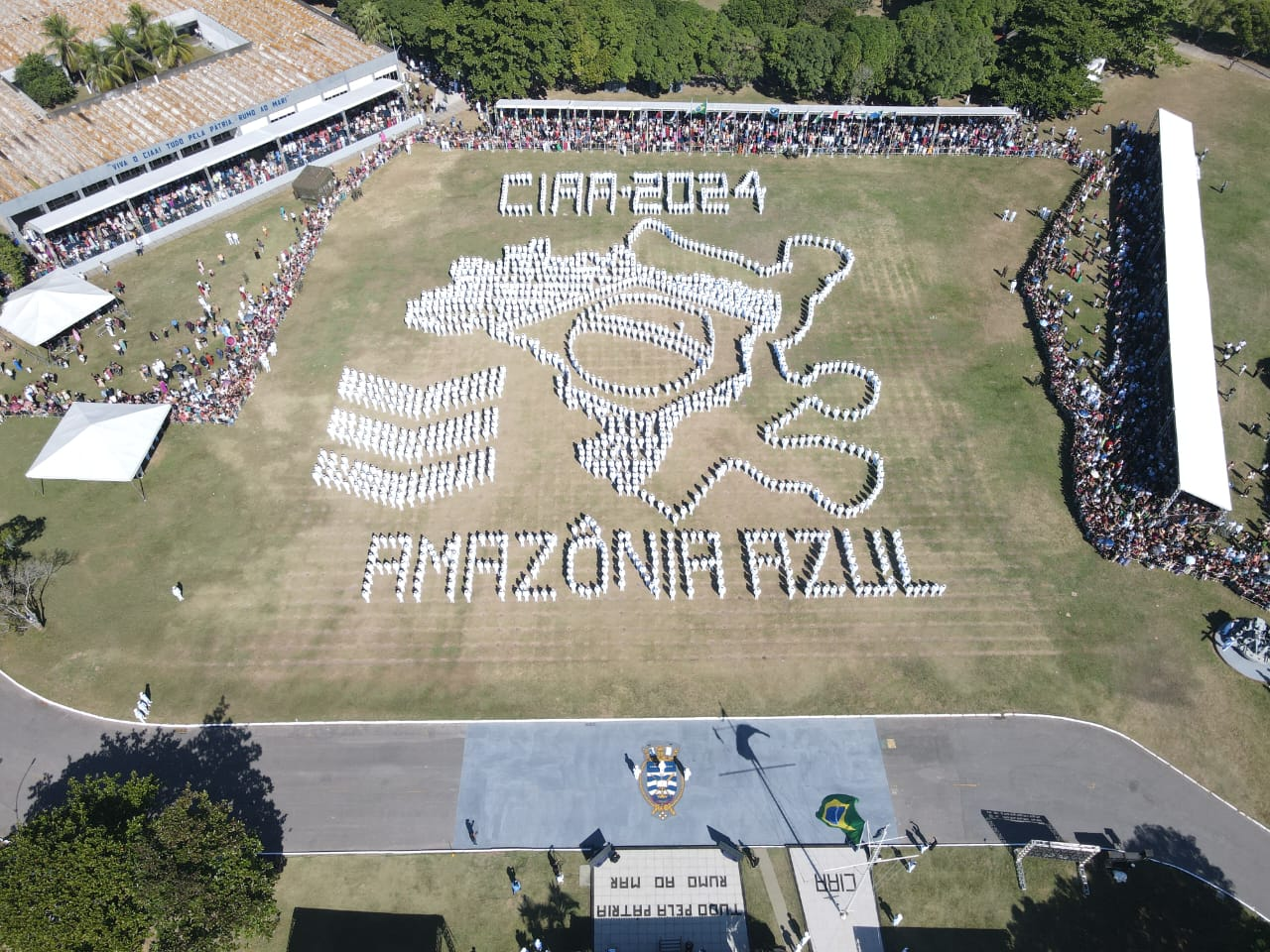
Sergeants in the Admiral Alexandrino Instruction Center line up in the shape of the Blue Amazon

To encompass all maritime spaces under Brazilian jurisdiction, in 2004 the Navy publicized the concept of a "Blue Amazon" (Amazônia Azul), which, as mentioned by admiral Júlio Soares de Moura Neto, Commander of the Navy in 2013, is a synonym for jurisdictional waters. The formal definition is "the region which comprises the surface of the sea, waters overlying the seabed, seabed and subsoil within the atlantic expanse which projects from the coast until the outer limit of the Brazilian continental shelf". The Blue Amazon is not a legal term. It is used in the Navy's external and internal communication and by scientific, environmental and other civilian sectors.

The term was coined to draw the public's attention to this area by comparison with the "Green" Amazon's vastness and abundance of natural resources. It is understood in multiple facets, that is, areas of interest to the state: sovereignty and national defense via political-strategic influence in the South Atlantic Ocean, economic prosperity, scientific and technological innovation and environmental conservation, with an emphasis on the first. The Navy has undertaken a national campaign to publicize the concept, seeking popular support to its maritime strategy, the expansion of maritime limits and military re-equipment. More broadly, it promotes the public's "maritime mentality", seeking to regain what its proponents see as an "oceanic destiny" neglected by public consciousness.

== Delimitation ==
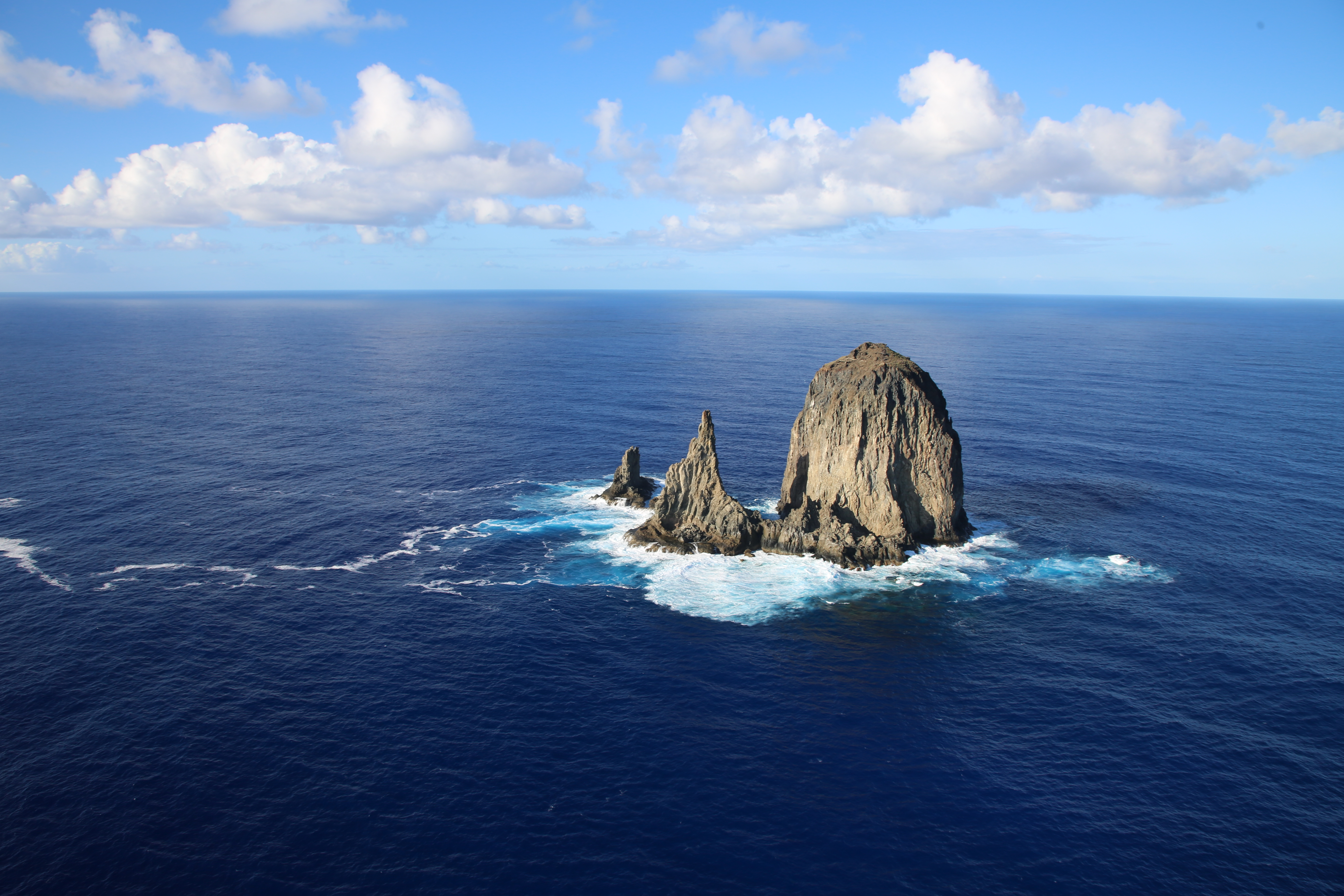
Island of Martim Vaz at the far east of Brazilian territory

The Brazilian coast measures 7,491 km, the longest in the South Atlantic. (Note: This value is reached by measuring the baselines. Higher numbers are cited, such as 9,000 km or even 10,800 km when counting bays and gulfs. See coastline paradox.) Its baselines project, in the Navy's numbers, an area of 3,575,195.81 km^{2} within the 200 nmi strip, including a territorial sea measuring 157,975.47 km^{2} and a contiguous zone of 325,328.34 km^{2}. 2,094,656.59 km^{2} of extended continental shelf are added to this number to reach a total of 5,669,852.41 km^{2}. This corresponds to 67% of national territory (8.5 million km^{2}) and 1.1 times the size of the Legal Amazon (5.2 million km^{2}). As the AJB also include internal waters, around 60 thousand kilometers of waterways can be counted in its extent. The 5.7 million km^{2} total claim is reached when counting the most recent (2018) revised proposals for the extended continental shelf. Earlier proposals reached a total of 4,451,766 km^{2}.

This area has two international maritime boundaries, one with French Guiana and another with Uruguay, both of which are defined by rhumb lines (which cross the meridians at a constant angle) starting from the border: near the Oyapock River, for the former, and Chuí Lighthouse, for the latter. These limits were defined in 1972 with Uruguay and 1981 with France.

=== Territorial sea ===
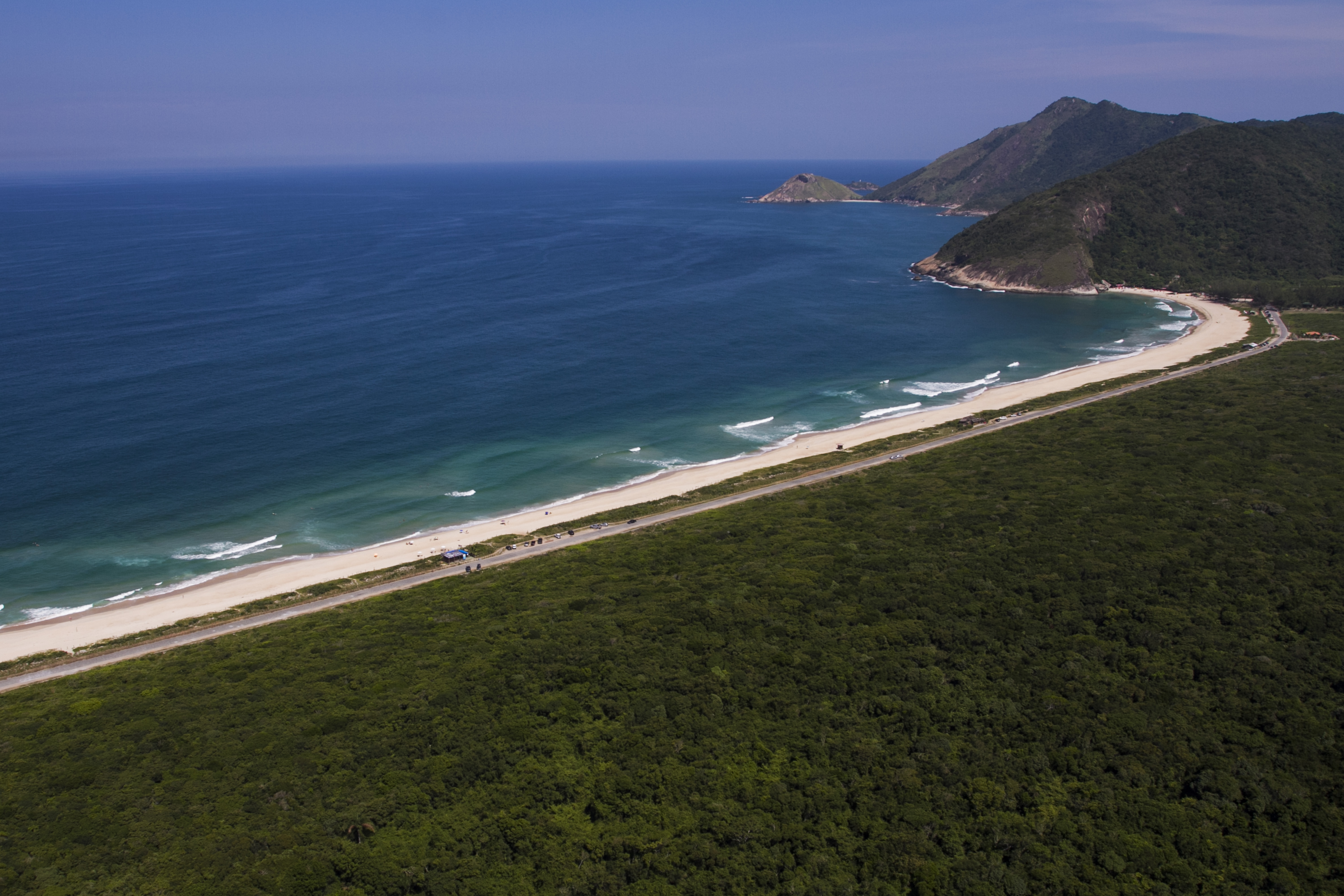
Grumari beach in Rio de Janeiro. The territorial sea begins on baselines along the coast

Since the 19th century, the Brazilian territorial sea was defined as a three-mile strip along the coast. Exclusive fishing rights were at 12 nmi from the shore in 1938. A presidential decree added a further three miles of territorial sea in 1966, in a "six miles plus six miles" regime, comparable to a contiguous zone and exclusive fishing rights zone, as far as 12 nmi from the shore. The territorial sea was once again extended in 1969 to a width of 12 nmi.

In the following year, Emílio Garrastazu Médici's government (1969–1974) claimed a territorial sea as far as 200 nmi, spanning 3.2 million km^{2} of the ocean. All of its seabed, subsoil and airspace were to be placed under Brazilian sovereignty. At a time when the ruling military dictatorship envisioned great power status, this decision answered fishing interests and fears of foreign activity (military exercises and exploitation of recently discovered oil fields off the coast of Rio de Janeiro). Public opinion, riding a wave of patriotic fervor, responded favorably. Other Latin American countries endorsed the measure, which was not without precedent, as Argentina and Uruguay had made similar declarations.

Contemporary international law defined no maximum width for the territorial sea, but in the early 1970s most states, including traditional maritime powers, recognized no jurisdiction beyond 12 nmi from the shore. Therefore, the Ministry of Foreign Affairs received letters of protest from the United States, the Soviet Union and nine other industrialized states. The Brazilian fleet, with a mere 57 ships of significant tonnage, lacked the effective capability to patrol the full extent of the claims. When Brazil signed the UNCLOS, it gave in to great power pressures, in the opinion of diplomat Luiz Augusto de Araújo Castro. Once the treaty was harmonized with the country's law in 1993, the Brazilian government retracted the limits of its territorial sea, from 200 to 12 nmi, but secured a 200-mile EEZ.

=== EEZ ===
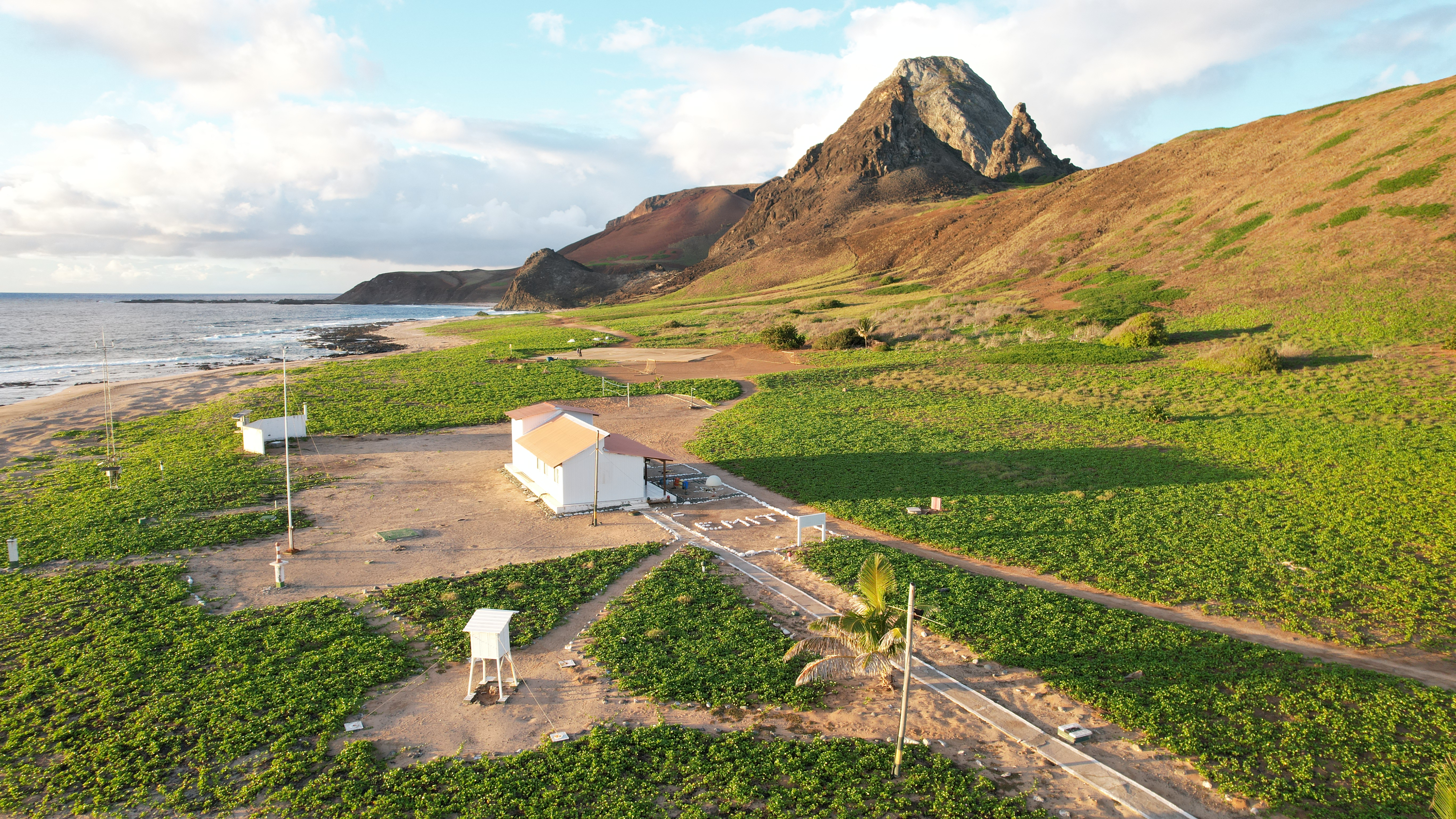
Trindade Island garrison

The University of British Columbia's Sea Around Us database quantifies a Brazilian EEZ spanning 2,400,918 km^{2} projected from the continental shore, 468,599 km^{2} surrounding the Trindade and Martim Vaz Archipelago, 363,373 km^{2} surrounding the Fernando de Noronha Archipelago and 413,641 km^{2} surrounding the Saint Peter and Saint Paul Archipelago. Official Brazilian numbers are 3,539,919 km^{2} of total EEZ area, the world's 11th largest, with a water volume of 10 billion cubic meters. Nonetheless, this is a relatively small area compared to the length of the coast, as Brazil has few islands at major distances from the coast. The archipelagos of Trindade and Martim Vaz and Saint Peter and Saint Paul have minimal land areas, but project a quarter of the EEZ.

Article 121 of UNCLOS confers an EEZ and continental shelf to islands, but denies such privileges to "rocks which cannot sustain human habitation or economic life of their own". Among Brazil's oceanic islands, only Fernando de Noronha, Trindade and Belmonte (in Saint Peter and Saint Paul) are permanently inhabited. Fernando de Noronha has the largest population, 3,167 in the 2022 census. Trindade and Saint Peter and Saint Paul have research outposts established by the Navy. Rocas Atoll has no more than an automatic lighthouse. UNCLOS recognized it within Fernando de Noronha's jurisdiction, just as the Island of Martim Vaz was included in Trindade's. However, Colombian representatives in a continental shelf dispute with Nicaragua pointed in 2019 that Brazil claims Rocas as an island and note the official Brazilian map has an EEZ projecting from the atoll.

==== Occupation of St. Peter and St. Paul ====
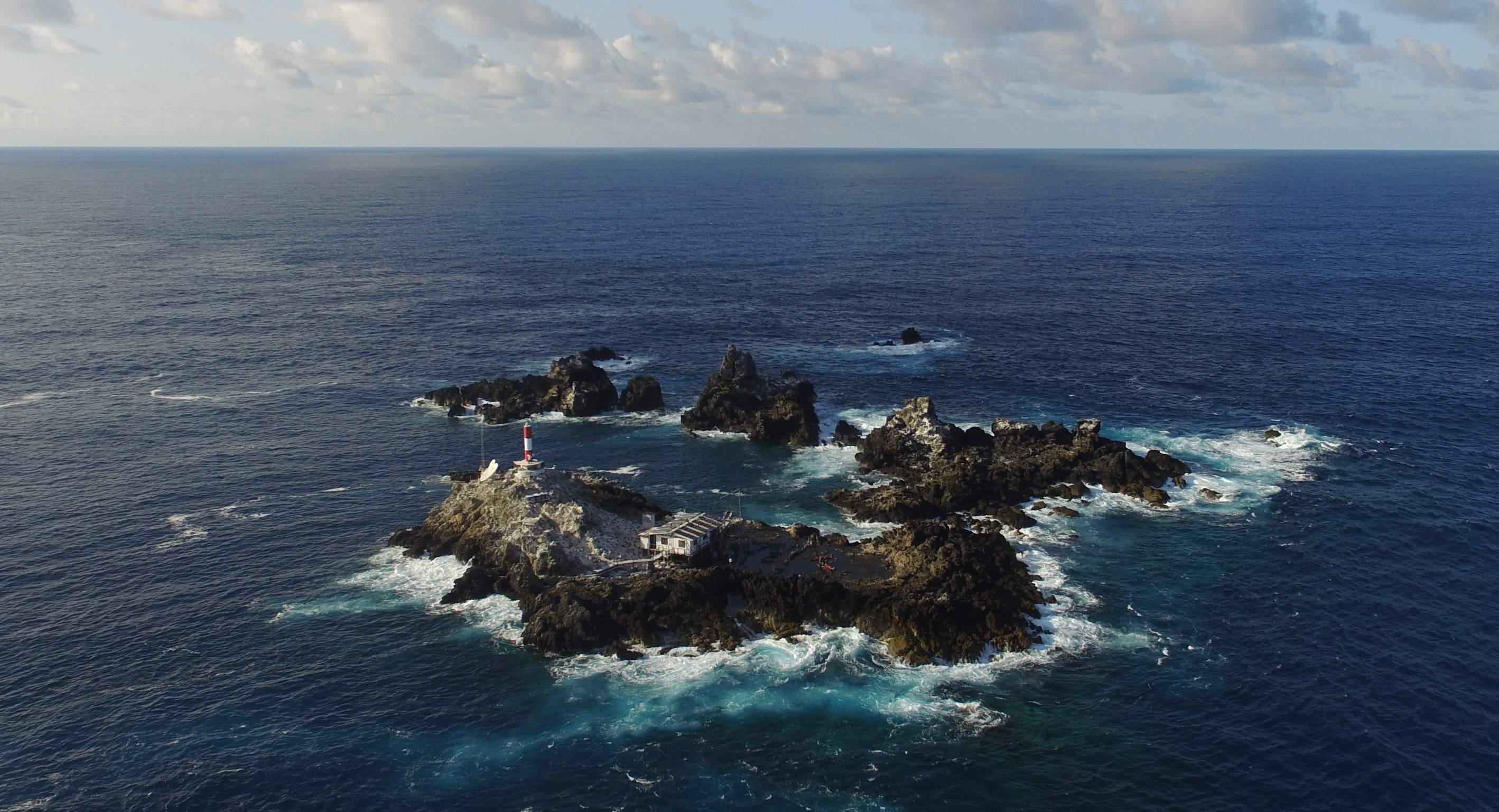
Garrison in Belmonte Islet, St. Peter and St. Paul Archipelago

Extending the EEZ is an openly declared objective of the Navy's presence in both Trindade and Saint Peter and Saint Paul. Brazilian sovereignty over Trindade was once contested by the United Kingdom in 1895–1896, and a permanent presence is maintained since 1957, with a population of 36 military personnel in 2023. On the other hand, Saint Peter and Saint Paul was a neglected territory with no records of human inhabitation. Only after UNCLOS came into force did the Navy's command take serious measures to occupy the area. The Archipelago Program (Proarquipélago), organized in 1996, installed a scientific station in Belmonte Islet and changed the site's toponymy from "Saint Peter and Saint Paul Rocks" to "Saint Peter and Saint Paul Archipelago".

The station has room for four researches and/or seamen over 15-day periods. Conditions for habitation are poor: researchers are only allowed after undergoing survival training, and a ship is kept on standby to aid the station, which is about 1,000 km from the coast. The islets and rocks have a maximum width of 420 meters, lack soil and drinking water and are exposed to seismic events and severe weather. In the official Brazilian understanding, a permanent presence is by itself enough to distinguish an island according to Article 121, regardless of the population's biweekly rotation and difficult survival.

Starting in 1995, the Navy's Directorate of Hydrography and Navigation published nautical charts with a dotted red line in the 200 nmi radius around the rocks, indicating its potential EEZ and continental shelf. The Navy presented the Interministerial Commission on Marine Resources with its case in 1999, citing the precedents of Rockall, Okinotorishima, some Hawaiian islands, Clipperton, Jan Mayen and Aves. The Ministry of Foreign Relations was favorable and noted: "although the UNCLOS is clear about the rocks which cannot sustain human habitation, it cannot be denied that there is permanent occupation in the said archipelago, though its 'inhabitants' depend on the continent for its sustainability". Their greatest concern was having the claim challenged by other parties to the UNCLOS. After securing approval from the president and the National Defense Council, on August 27, 2004 Brazil submitted the coordinates of the external limits of its EEZ to the UN's Bulletin of the Law of the Sea. The area around Saint Peter and Saint Paul was formally claimed for the first time.

Proarquipélago yielded rights to an area the size of Bahia, whose limits are closer to Africa than South America. Article 121 has its controversies, among them the South China Sea Arbitration, whose conclusions may contradict Brazil's interpretation of the legal status of Saint Peter and Saint Paul. The Permanent Court of Arbitration ruled that "the mere presence of a small number of persons on a feature" that "is only capable of sustaining habitation through the continued delivery of supplies from outside" does not equate to island status under Article 121. No state has objected to Brazil's claim over the archipelago.

== Oceanography ==
=== Geomorphology ===
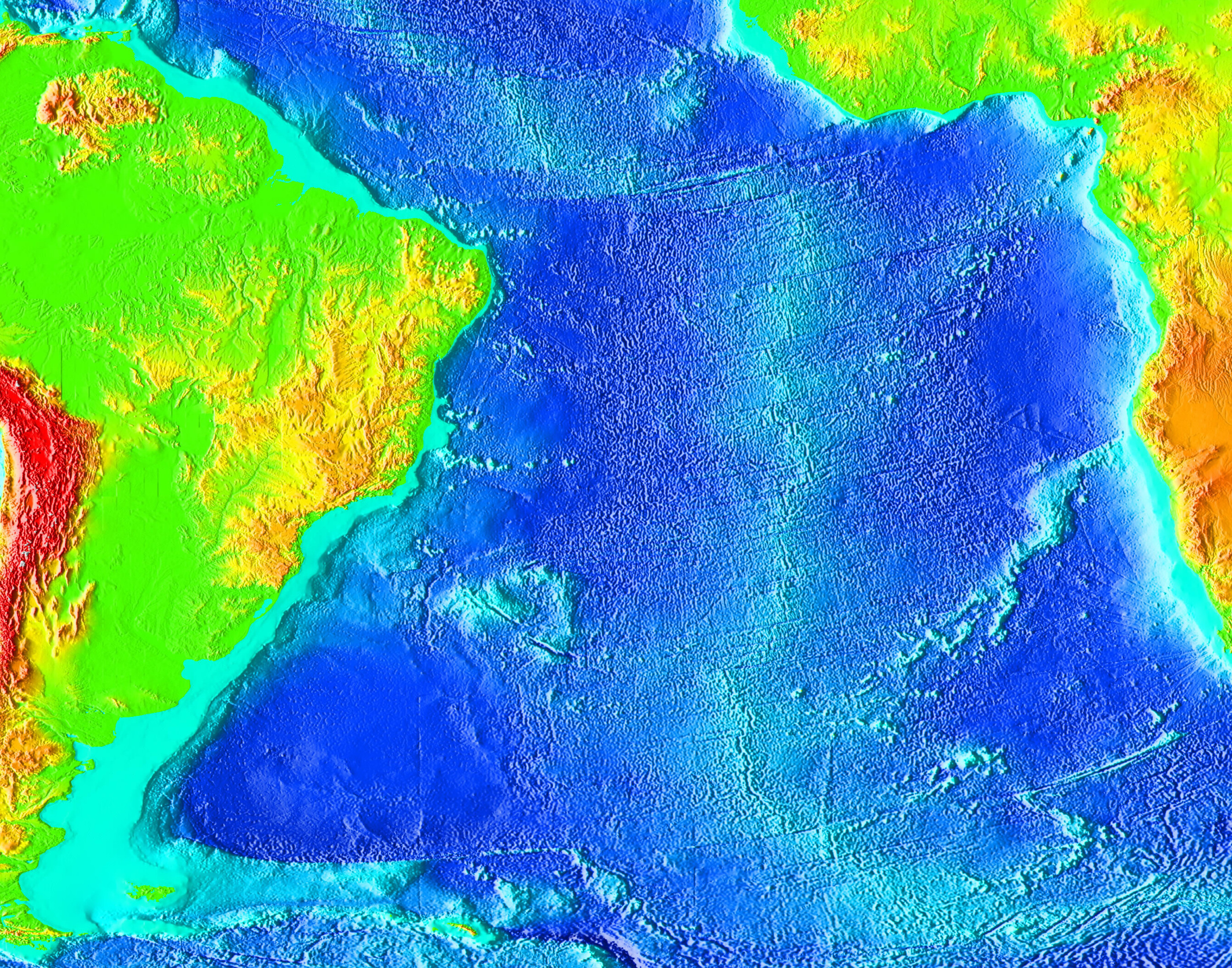
Bathymetric map of the South Atlantic

The seabed and subsoil beneath the AJB mostly consists of a portion of the divergent continental margin formed out of the split between the South American and African plates. Its continental shelf (geomorphological, not legal), slope and rise are well defined but interrupted by other features fashioned by tectonic and sedimentary forces. The far northern coast is part of the North Atlantic's divergent margin, and another sector to the east is a part of a transform margin.

20.5% of the area beneath the EEZ is at depths shallower than 200 m, which may be considered part of the continental shelf. Deep-sea features cover the rest: the continental slope (13.3%), terraces (1.7%), submarine canyons (1.4%), the continental rise (40%), abyssal plains (29.6%), submarine fans (4.9%), seamounts (2.2%), guyots (1.4%), ridges (1.2%) and spreading ridges (1.4%). These percentages add up to more than 100%, as some features occupy the same spaces. Five islands or archipelagos rise out of the ocean floor: Saint Peter and Saint Paul in the Mid-Atlantic Ridge, Rocas Atoll and Fernando de Noronha in the Fernando de Noronha Ridge and Trindade and Martin Vaz in the Vitória-Trindade Ridge.

=== Ocean currents ===
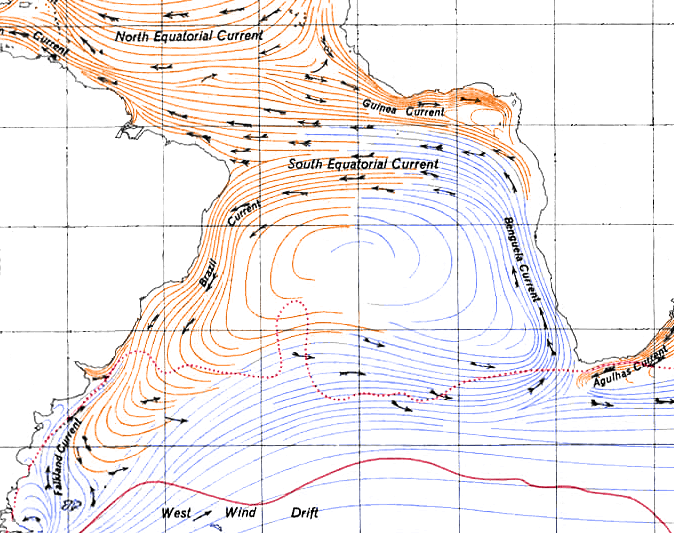
Surface ocean currents in the South Atlantic

The two main surface currents off the Brazilian coast are the Brazil and North Brazil (or Guiana) currents, both of which have warm, nutrient-poor waters with a deep thermocline (the layer in which temperature rapidly lowers with depth). They appear around the 11th parallel south, between Recife and Maceió, when the South Equatorial Current, pushed west by the trade winds, meets the South American continent and splits in two. Most of its water proceeds to the northwest towards the Caribbean, forming the North Brazil Current, and the remainder flows southwest, forming the Brazil Current. Both run parallel to the coast. The North Brazil Current achieves speeds of 1–2 m/s, pushing the Amazonas River's plume, which provides a fifth of the global fresh water discharge into the ocean, to the northwest. Amazonian waters may be found up to 320 km from the coast.

The Brazil Current is the western arm of the South Atlantic Gyre, a counterclockwise cycle of currents between South America and Africa. It flows until the latitudes of 35° to 40° S, where it meets the colder waters of the Falkland Current and both turn to the east, forming the South Atlantic Current. The Gyre returns to South America through the South Equatorial Current. The Brazil Current's surface water mass is known as the Tropical Water, with an 18 °C to 28 °C temperature range and an average salinity of 35.1 to 36.2 ppm. These values are comparable to its North Atlantic counterpart, the Gulf Stream. It is, however, slower, with a speed below 0.6 m/s. Its depth in the water column reaches 200 m on the edge of the continental shelf.

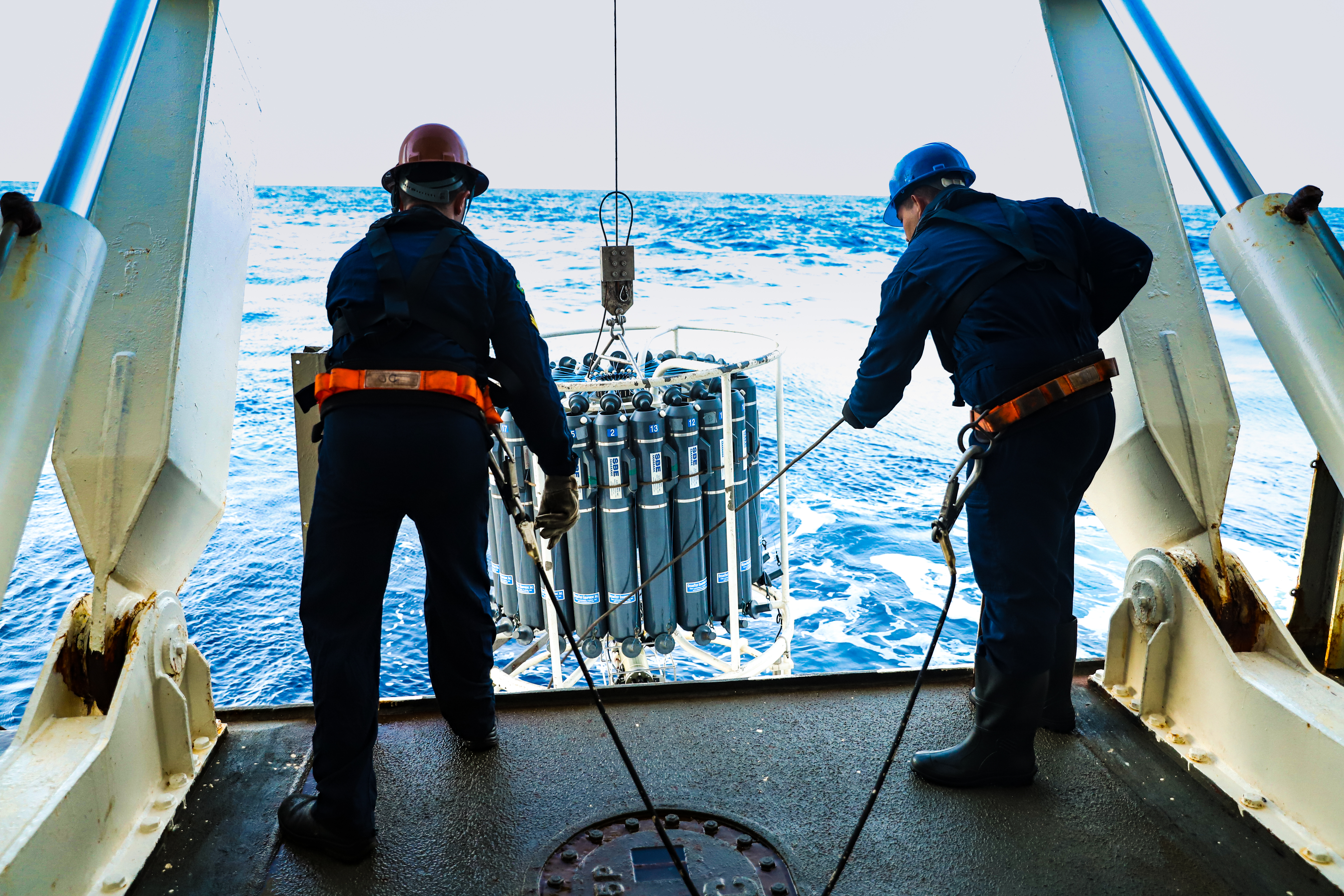
Deep water sampling by the Vital de Oliveira

In the Southern and Southeastern regions, the Brazil Current draws closer and further from the coast throughout the year, defining a strong seasonal pattern in water temperature and salinity. In winter, the Falkland Current may reach as far north as the 24th parallel south. Its water mass, known as the Subantarctic Water, mixes with the Tropical Water to form the South Atlantic Central Water (SACW), which, as a colder and denser mass, forms a layer beneath the Tropical Water in the Brazil Current. Certain points in the coast (Cape Frio and Cape Santa Marta) are subject to upwellings of the SACW when northeasterly winds push surface waters.

In the Santos Basin the Tropical Water has concentrations of 4.19 ml/L of dissolved oxygen, 0.02 μmol/L of phosphate, 1.10 μmol/L of nitrate and 2.04 μmol/L of silicate. In contrast, the SACW has 5.13 ml/L of oxygen, 0.51 μmol/L of phosphate, 6.14 μmol/L of nitrate and 5.12 μmol/L of silicate. At the 20th parallel south, the SACW extends to a depth of 660 m in the first semester. Further depths contain the Antarctic Intermediate Water (700–1,200 m), North Atlantic Deep Water (1,200–2,000 m) and Antarctic Bottom Water.

=== Climate ===
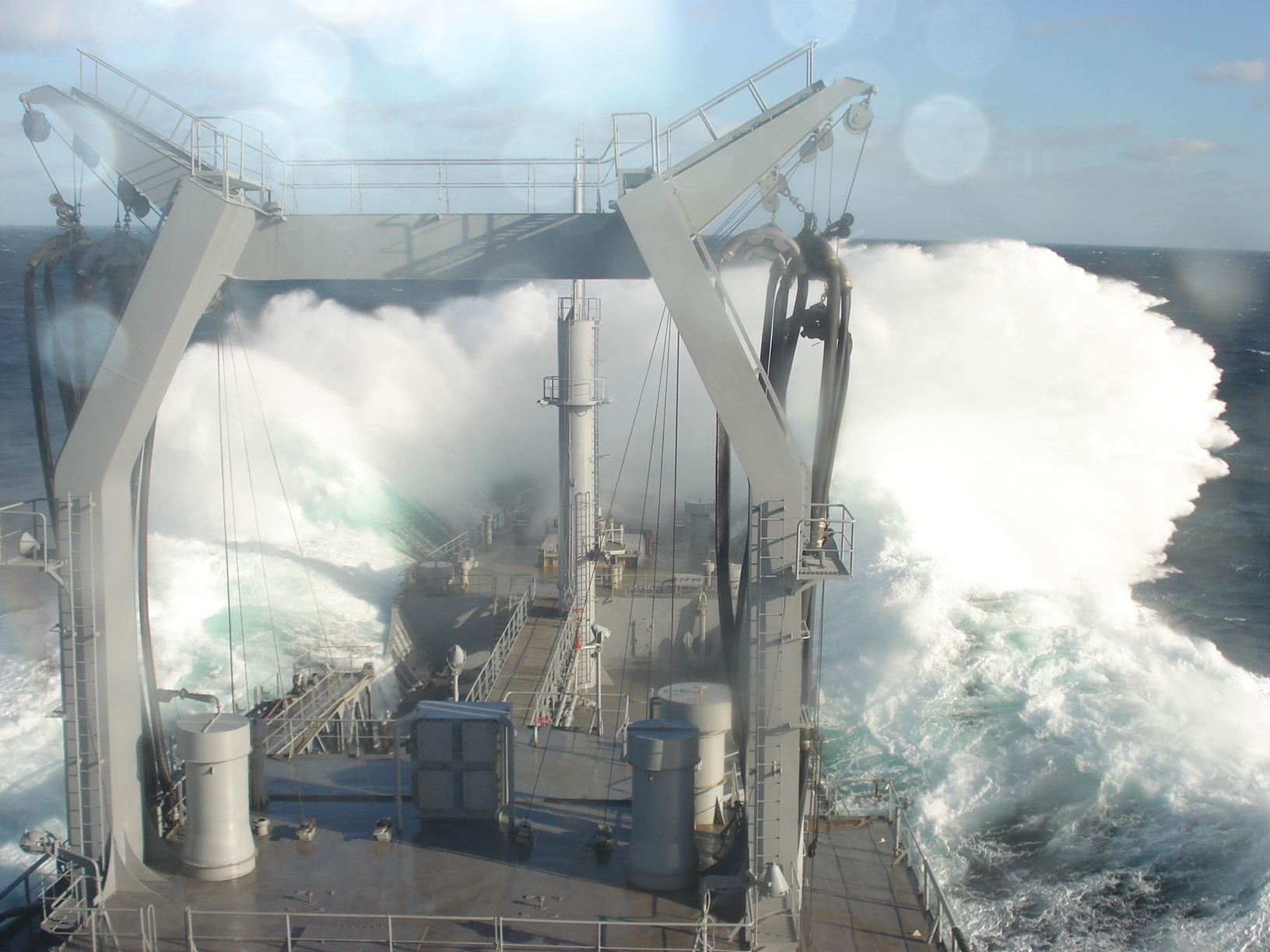
Waves breaking against the bow of the tanker Almirante Gastão Motta (G-23)

Brazilian jurisdictional waters have three climate patterns: northern, from Cape Orange, Amapá to Cape Branco, Paraíba,central, from Cape Branco to Cape São Tomé, Rio de Janeiro, and southern, from Cape São Tomé to Chuí Stream. The northern climate pattern is dominated by the Intertopical Convergence Zone, a belt of clouds shaped in an east-west direction by trade winds. It moves south of the Equator from January to April, although it may rapidly change its position, and brings convective rainfall, often in the form of storms. In some years it stays further north, causing drought in Northeastern Brazil and lower temperatures in the southern tropical Atlantic. The inverse happens when it stays further south.

The central region is more seasonal. Easterly and northeasterly trade winds carry moisture from the coast and become colder and stronger in winter, from June to August, due to the South Atlantic High. In this period, precipitation increases between Cape Branco and Salvador and lowers to the south. Easterly waves and, from May to October, cold fronts cause rainfall, and in the latter case, rough seas and lower temperatures.

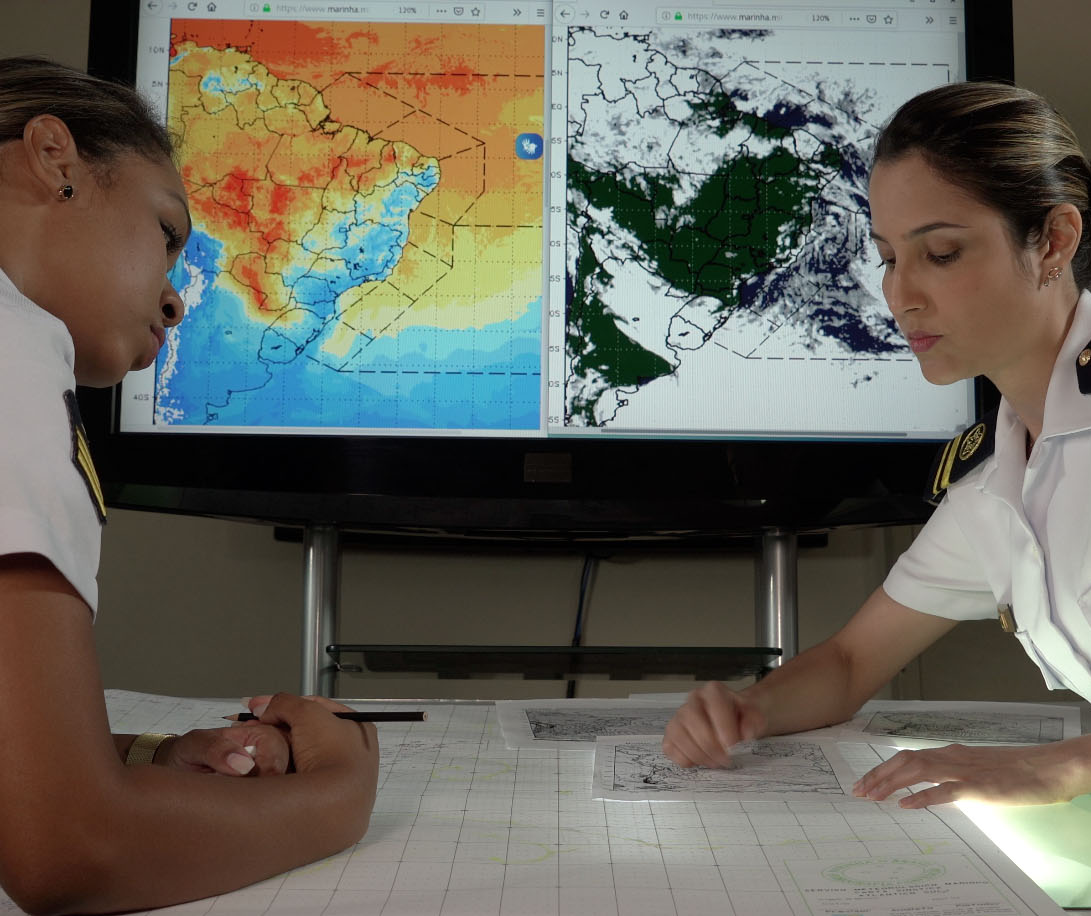
Meteorologists of the Navy Hydrography Center

The southern region is ruled by two phenomena, the South Atlantic Convergence Zone (SACZ) and extratropical cyclones. The SACZ is a northwest-southeast axis of clouds most common in summer, south of Bahia's coast, causing multiple days of bad weather. Extratropical cyclones may occur on a weekly basis in winter and are followed by cold fronts. They come from the south of the continent in a northeasterly direction. causing low temperatures, rainfall and rough seas. Wind speeds may exceed 60 km/h in trajectories parallel to the coast, occasionally sinking small fishing boats. Cold air masses linger in their aftermath, some of which are dry, having crossed the Andes, while others come from the Weddell Sea and are humid, but not as cold.

Brazil's oceanic islands have maritime-influenced tropical climates. Trindade has an average annual temperature of 25 °C and a dry season from January to March. Fernando de Noronha has an average annual temperature of 27 °C, with a dry season from August to February.

Oceanographic and meteorological data are traditionally collected by ships, coastal stations and drifting or stationary buoys, which is labor-intensive to repeatedly monitor over large areas and time periods, but can be eased by satellites. Public investment into these activities is organized since 1995 under the Pilot Program for the Global Ocean Observing System (GOOS/Brasil), which includes the National Buoys Program and the Pilot Research Moored Array in the Tropical Atlantic (Pirata), a joint American-French-Brazilian program which contributes to climate monitoring in Northern and Northeastern Brazil.

=== Marine life ===
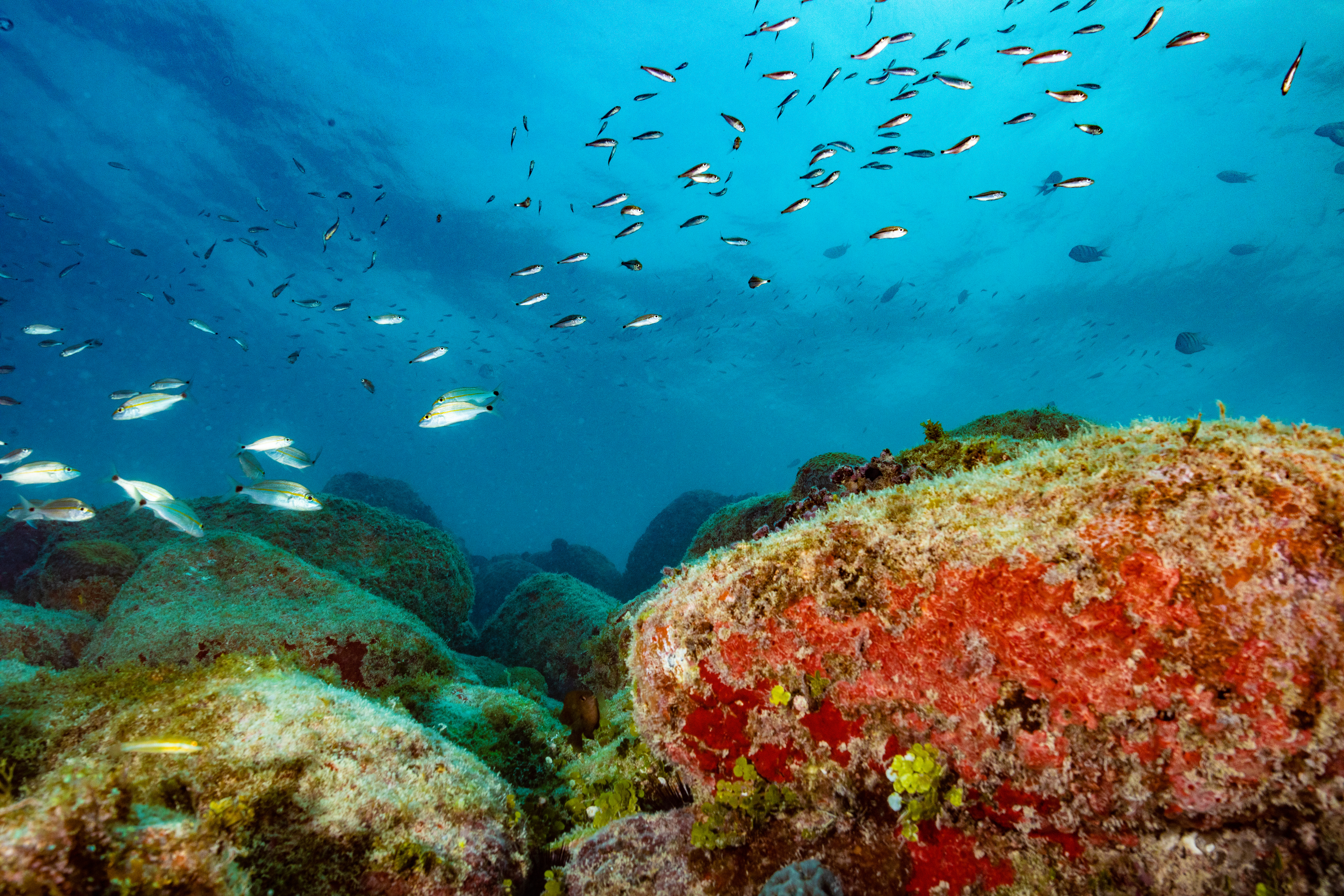
Marine fauna in Abrolhos

Brazil's marine ecosystem is vast and hydrologically and topographically complex, spanning a wide range of habitats and high levels of endemism. 31.8% of the coast's length can be classified into bays and estuaries, 27.6% as beaches and rocky shores, 18% as lagoons and coastal marshes, 13.6% as mangrove forests and 9% as dunes and cliffs. About 3,000 km or a third of the coast has reefs in the continental shelf: coral reefs from 0° 52' N to 19° S and rocky reefs from 20° to 28° S. At greater depths, sedimented slopes, submarine canyons, reef-forming and solitary corals, methane seeps and pockmarks, seamounts and guyots have distinct benthic communities.

A 2011 literature review counted 9,103 marine species in the Brazilian coast, of which 8,878 were animals: 1,966 crustaceans, 1,833 molluscs, 1,294 vertebrates (fish), 987 annelids, 535 cnidarians, 400 sponges, 308 miscellaneous invertebrates, 254 echinoderms, 178 miscellaneous vertebrates, 133 bryozoans, 70 tunicates and 45 flatworms. In other kingdoms, two species were found among bacteria, 488 rhodophytes, 201 chlorophytes and 14 angiosperms among plants and 49 dinoflagellates and 15 foraminiferans among protists. Real numbers may be as high as 13 thousand. 66 invasive species have been accounted for.

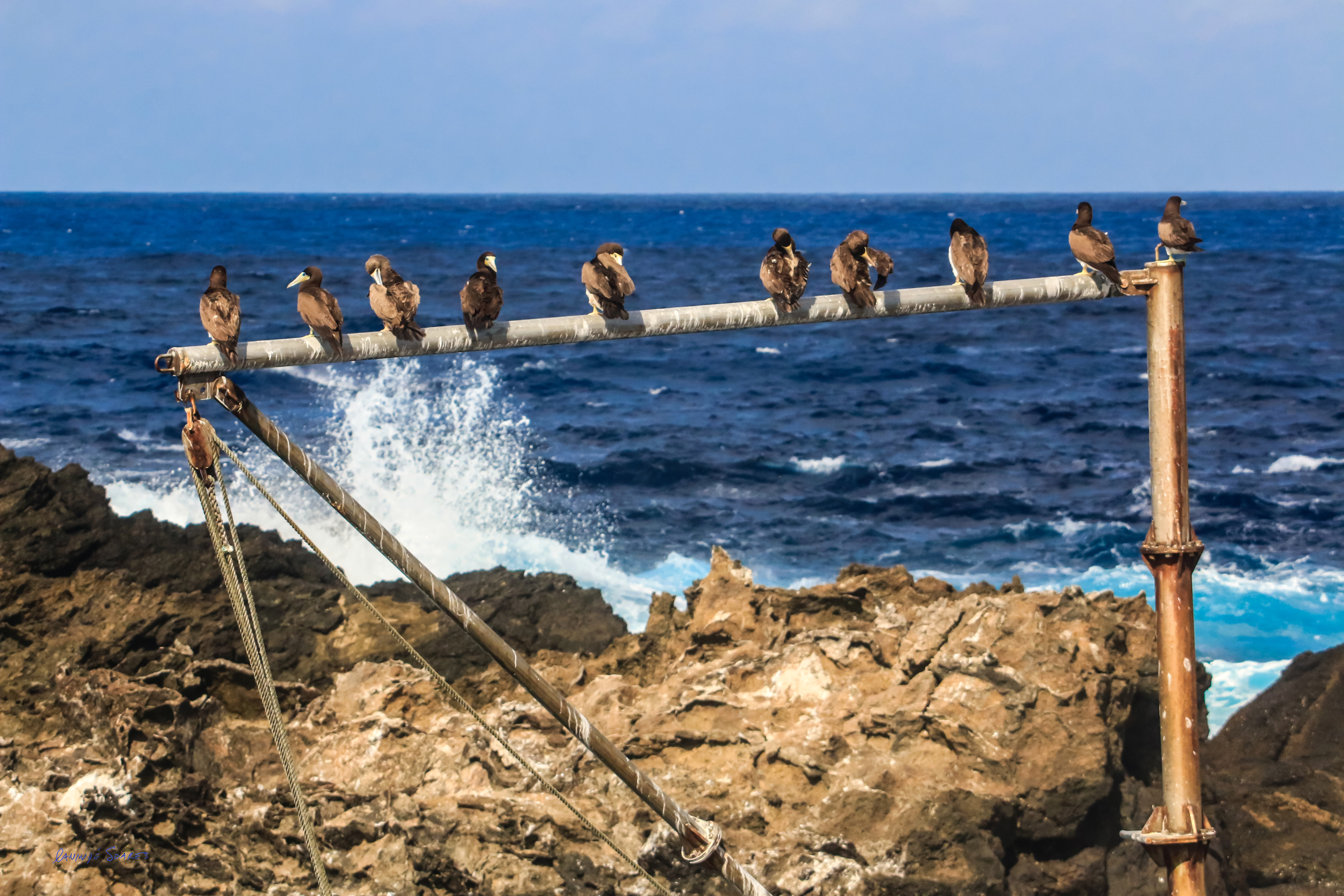
Seabirds in the St. Peter and St. Paul Archipelago

Although the number of species is high, each has a relatively small biomass. The two prevailing currents, Brazil and North Brazil, are poor in nutrient salts in the euphotic layer, where photosynthesis and biomass production take place at the lowest trophic level, and have a deep thermocline, which restrains bottom-to-surface nutrient flow. Greater levels of biomass may be found in the Falkland Current, which has a higher concentration of nutrient salts; upwelling zones such as Cape Frio; closer to shore, where shallow waters, river discharge, wind and tides allow turbulence to enrich seawater; and stretches of the Northern coast under the influence of the Amazon River's nutrient-rich fresh water.

In nutrient poor-waters, picoplankton are the chief primary producers. Upwelling zones have larger species of phytoplankton and greater populations of pelagic fish. Pelagic community transfer organic matter to benthic communities, of which there are two geographical groups: thee northern, southeastern and southern coasts have flat bottoms of sand, mud and clay, whereas the eastern and northeastern coasts have irregular, rocky bottoms formed by calcareous algae. Seabird diversity is relatively low (around 130 species). Rocas Atoll and other areas are breeding grounds for Northern Hemisphere birds, from September to May, and southern birds from May to August.

== Human activity ==
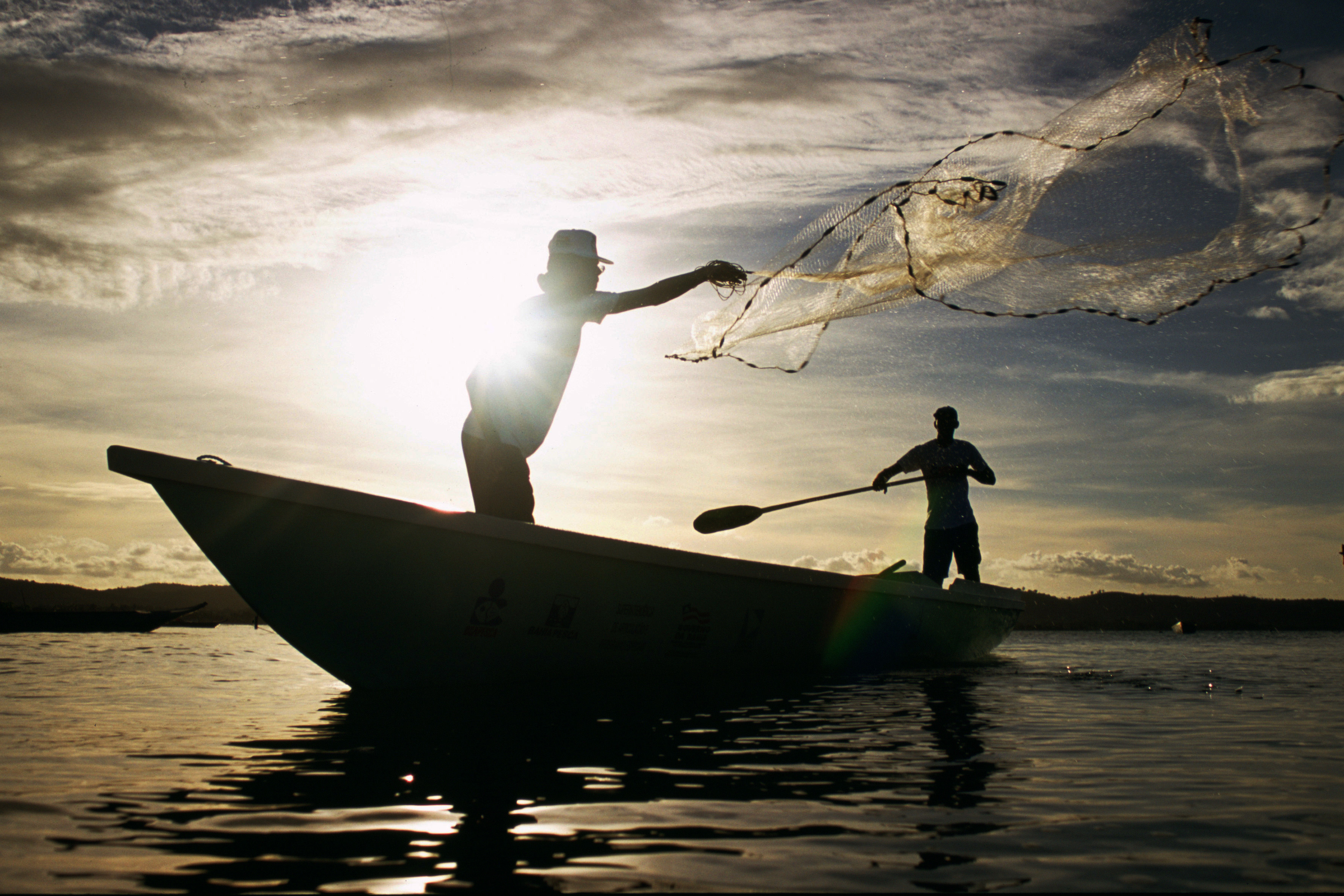
Artisanal fishing in Bahia

The "Blue Amazon's" human dimension is not as complex as the "Green Amazon's", as seafarers and oil rig workers are its only inhabitants. On the other hand, 26.6% of the Brazilian population or 50 million inhabitants lived in the coastal zone's 450 thousand km^{2} as of the 2010 census, a demographic density up to five times the national average. This population is concentrated in a few urban centers, leaving other areas of the coast with a low density of occupation. 13 state capitals are coastal. Many coastal resources have concurrent and competing uses and are thus a stage for social and environmental conflicts stemming from contradictions between environmental conservation, economic development and public, private, local and global interests.

Interests as diverse as those of the ministries of Justice and Public Security, Defense, Foreign Affairs, Economy, Infrastructure, Agriculture and Livestock, Education, Citizenship, Technology and Innovation, Environment, Tourism and Regional Development are represented in the Interministerial Commission for Marine Resources (Comissão Interministerial para os Recursos do Mar, CIRM). This body coordinates the state's strategic programs in the sector, such as LEPLAC, as outlined in the National Marine Resources Policy and the four-year Sectoral Plans for Marine Resources. The CIRM is coordinated by the Commander of the Navy, who is represented in the commission by an officer who also heads the Secretariat (SECIRM), a supporting organ which maintains contact with federal ministries, state governments, the scientific community and private entities.

=== Research ===
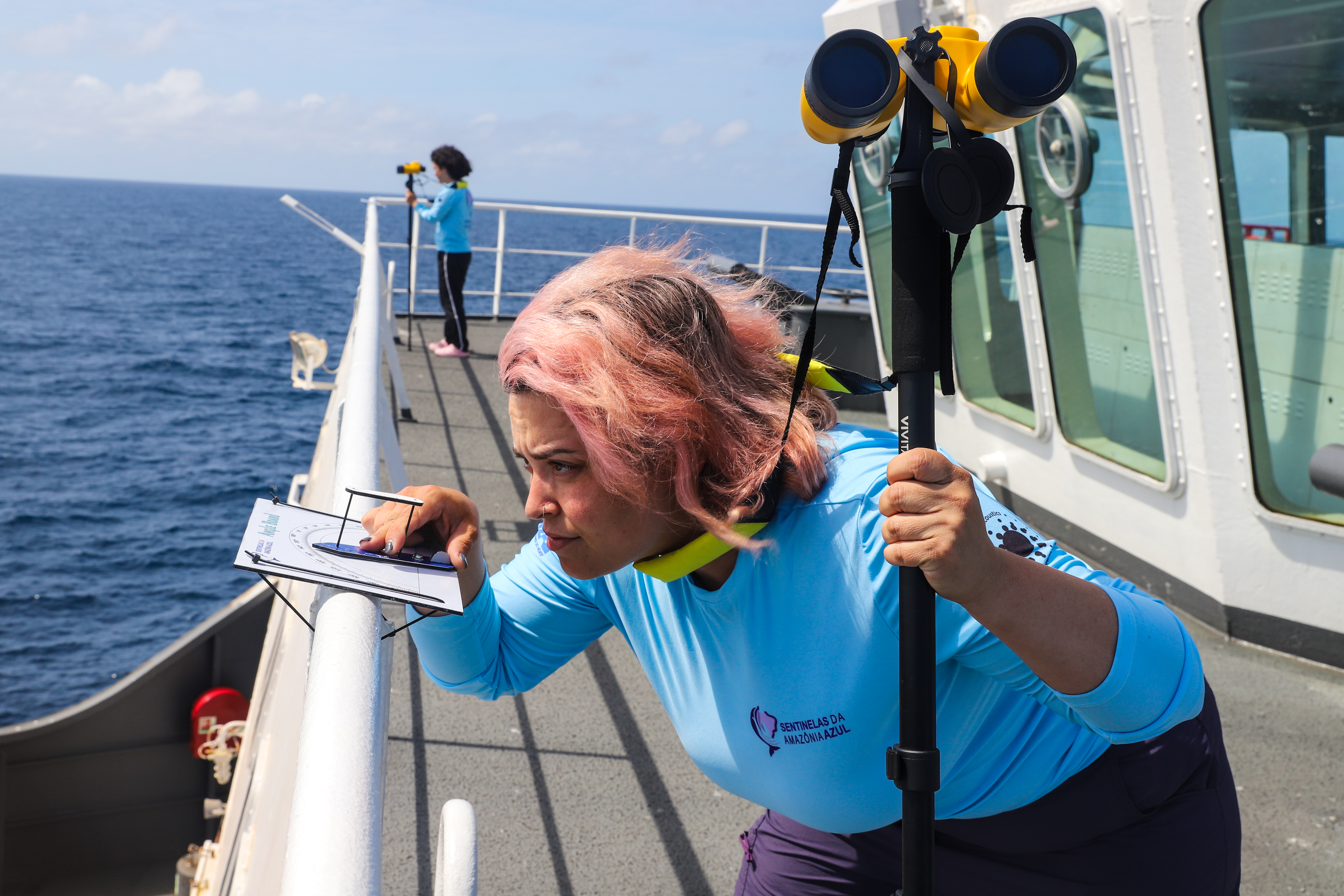
Ceteacean spotting in the region between the coast and the St. Peter and St. Paul Archipelago

The Brazilian state invests in several research programs in the South Atlantic to shore up its continental shelf expansion proposals, ensure national presence in oceanic islands and understand the area's biodiversity and natural resources. National oceanography has succeeded in surveys of the continental shelf's geology and the EEZ's living resources, engineering projects and participation in international research programs, but the number of researches and availability of equipment and vessels are not enough for the breadth of the field.

Oceanic science, technology and innovation in the country is mostly financed by public entities, with notable exceptions of companies such as Chevron, Equinor, Shell and Vale. 65 higher education institutions offered 1,840 annual positions in courses in Marine Sciences in 2022. Both the Navy and civilian institutions operate oceanographic research vessels. A national institute of the sea comparable to the role played by the Instituto Nacional de Pesquisas Espaciais, Empresa Brasileira de Pesquisa Agropecuária and Fundação Oswaldo Cruz in other areas, did not exist until the foundation of the National Oceanic Research Institute (Instituto Nacional de Pesquisas Oceânicas, Inpo). Initially staffed with only 17 officials and a yearly budget of R$ 10 million, it is a small organization conceived to aggregate research data and direct strategic projects.

According to the Intergovernmental Oceanographic Commission, out of 370 thousand papers on marine science published globally in 2010–2014, Brazilian authors were on 13 thousand. In four categories, "functions and processes of marine ecosystems", "ocean health", "blue growth" and "human health and well-being", the percentage of papers in Brazil's total scientific output is higher than the international average, and the country is deemed specialized in these areas. The category "marine data and oceanic observation" is at the global average and "oceans and climate", "oceanic technology" and "oceanic crust and marine geological risks" were below average.

=== Economy ===
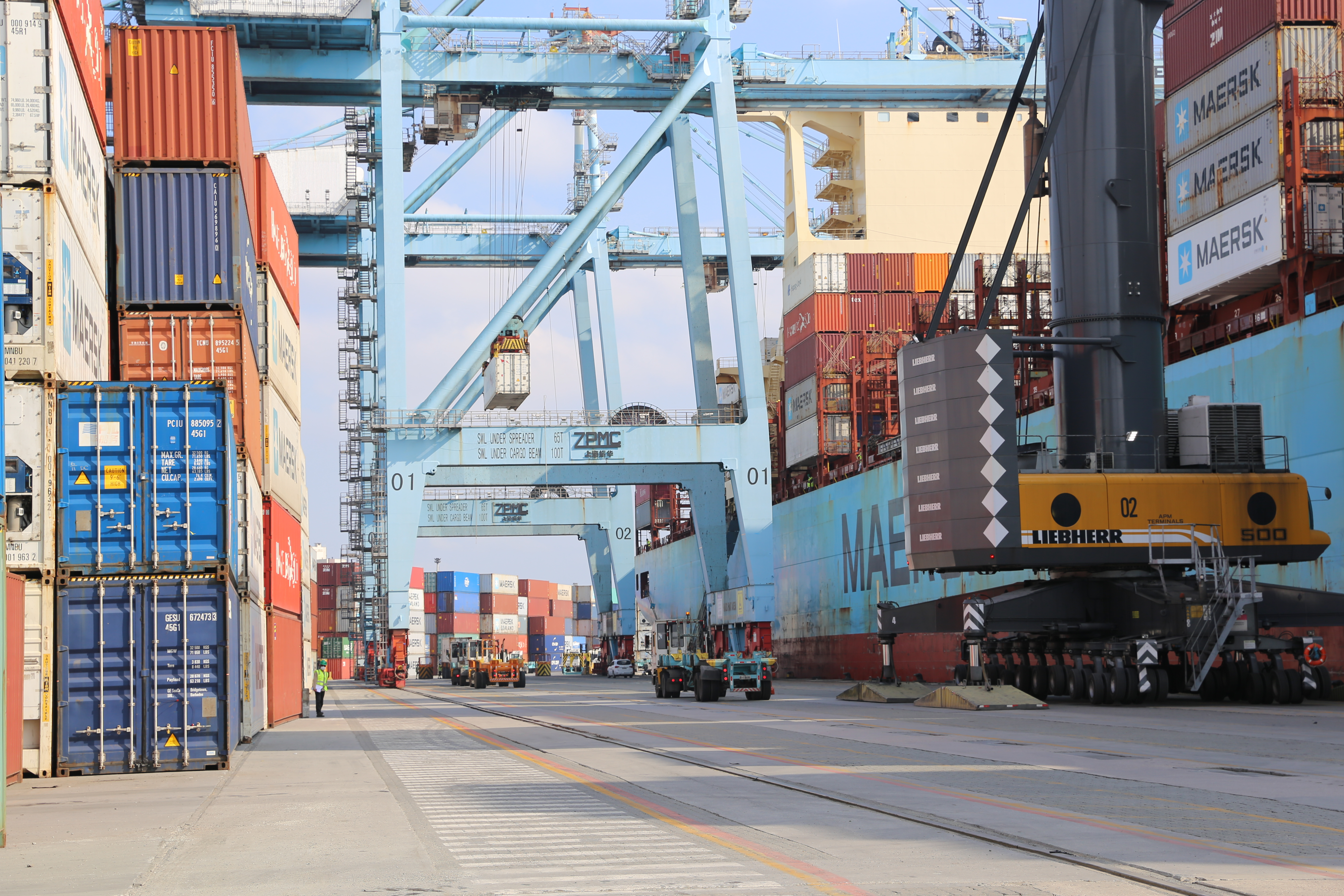
Containers at the Port of Itajaí, Santa Catarina

Brazilian jurisdictional waters directly participate in the national Gross Domestic Product (GDP) in six sectors: services (particularly tourism), energy, manufacturing, defense, fishing and transport. Furthermore, the sea hosts critical communications infrastructure, submarine cables through which the Brazilian Internet receives 98% of its data. Indirect economic contributions are much greater and may be difficult to measure: for instance, coastal sites boost value in the real estate sector. Specialists deem the maritime economy to still have idle potential, particularly in the "blue GDP" or blue economy, a socially- and environmentally-minded economic frontier.

A "maritime sector" does not exist in chief economic indexes such as the GDP and many activities are counted as part of other sectors, such as agriculture. There is no official and systematic methodology for its calculation. The first scientific study to account for the sector produced estimates for 2015: the maritime economy produced R$1.1 trillion or 18.93% of the national GDP and employed 19,829,439 workers. "Maritime-adjacent" sectors (Note: Which do not necessarily draw inputs or produce for the maritime environment, but are influenced by maritime policies.) were responsible for 16.26% of the GDP and 17,745,279 jobs, mostly in the tertiary sector. Activities directly conducted offshore, or whose products offshore, represented 2.67% of the GDP and 2,084,160 jobs. (Note: 1.02% and 1,320,004 in services, 0.65% and 314,593 in manufacturing, 0.38% and 179,814 in defense, 0.28% and 48,275 in energy, 0.18% and 130,408 in living resources and 0.16% and 91,066 in transport. Manufacturing, living resources and transport are the sectors in which an expansion in demand has the greatest estimated effect in the rest of the economy.)

In this estimate, the tourism-centered service sector is the chief activity in Brazil's maritime economy, rather than traditionally maritime sectors such as oil and gas, fishing and aquaculture. When properly accounted for, the sector is comparable in size to agribusiness. Comparisons with estimates in other countries may be misleading, as their methodologies are different, but the value estimated for the economy directly connected to the sea is consistent with a 2013 United States estimate of 2.2% of national GDP. In 2020 the CIRM tasked a research team with the definition of a measuring methodology so that in the future, official numbers can be published through the Institute of Geography and Statistics.

==== Trade ====
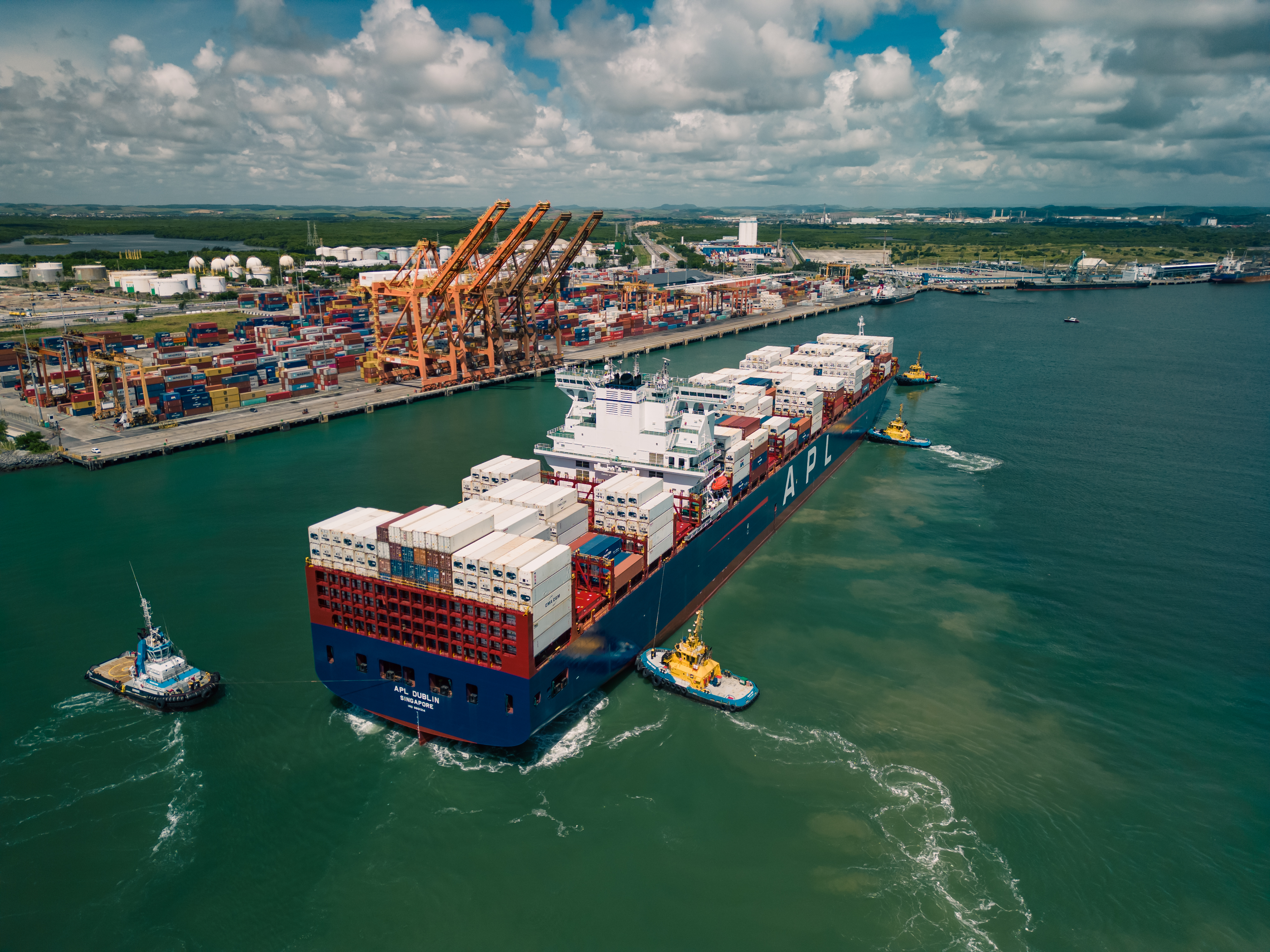
Container ship approaching the Port of Suape, Pernambuco

Coastal cities have in the sea a natural trade route between themselves and with other continents, one that is cost-effective for large volumes of cargo and long distances. Brazilian ports moved 1.151 billion tons of cargo in 2020 and employed 43,205 registered workers in 2021. The busiest ports were Santos, Paranaguá and Itaguaí, but Northern and Northeastern ports are on the rise as export terminals for Center-Western agricultural production.

Maritime transport is the primary mode of Brazilian international trade, shipping 98.6% of exports by weight and 88.9% by value in 2021 and 95% of the weight and 74% of the value of imports. In contrast, waterways have a modest participation in internal trade, contrary to what the length of the coastline may suggest. Internal shipping was used for a share of only 15% of domestic transport demand in 2015, 10% in coastal shipping and 5% on inland waterways. The sector has declined since 1950, when 32.4% of domestic transport demand was provided by ships. The sector has grown over the 21st century. It mostly services the oil and gas sector; from 2017 to 2019, the two largest points of departure were the Campos and Santos sedimentary basins, while the two largest destinations were the Petrobras terminals in São Sebastião and Angra dos Reis.

Transport between coastal hubs was historically provided almost exclusively by coastal shipping, but since the 1950s, developmental policies have prioritized land transport and the automobile industry. In the present, highways are the primary mode of transport. Coastal shipping has idle potential, and the sector's representatives emphasize its predictability, multimodality and lower risks of damage, theft and environmental accidents. However, companies interested in coastal shipping face logistical difficulties in modal integration, insufficient line frequency and high costs, which are a result of the fleet's high occupancy rates.

The Brazilian Merchant Marine employed 26,631 mariners, 887 ships and 5.522 million in deadweight tonnage in 2023. It is well-represented on internal shipping, in which it provided for 92% of container transport, 59.1% of general cargo, 24.3% of dry bulk cargo and 4.1% of wet bulk cargo in 2021. On international trade, the Brazilian flag can hardly be seen, with a few exceptions such as shipping to other Mercosul countries or oil exports. In 2008, Brazilian companies were responsible for around 10% of the international freight market, mostly by using chartered foreign vessels. In 2005, only 4% of freight fees from external trade were paid to Brazilian companies.

==== Shipbuilding ====
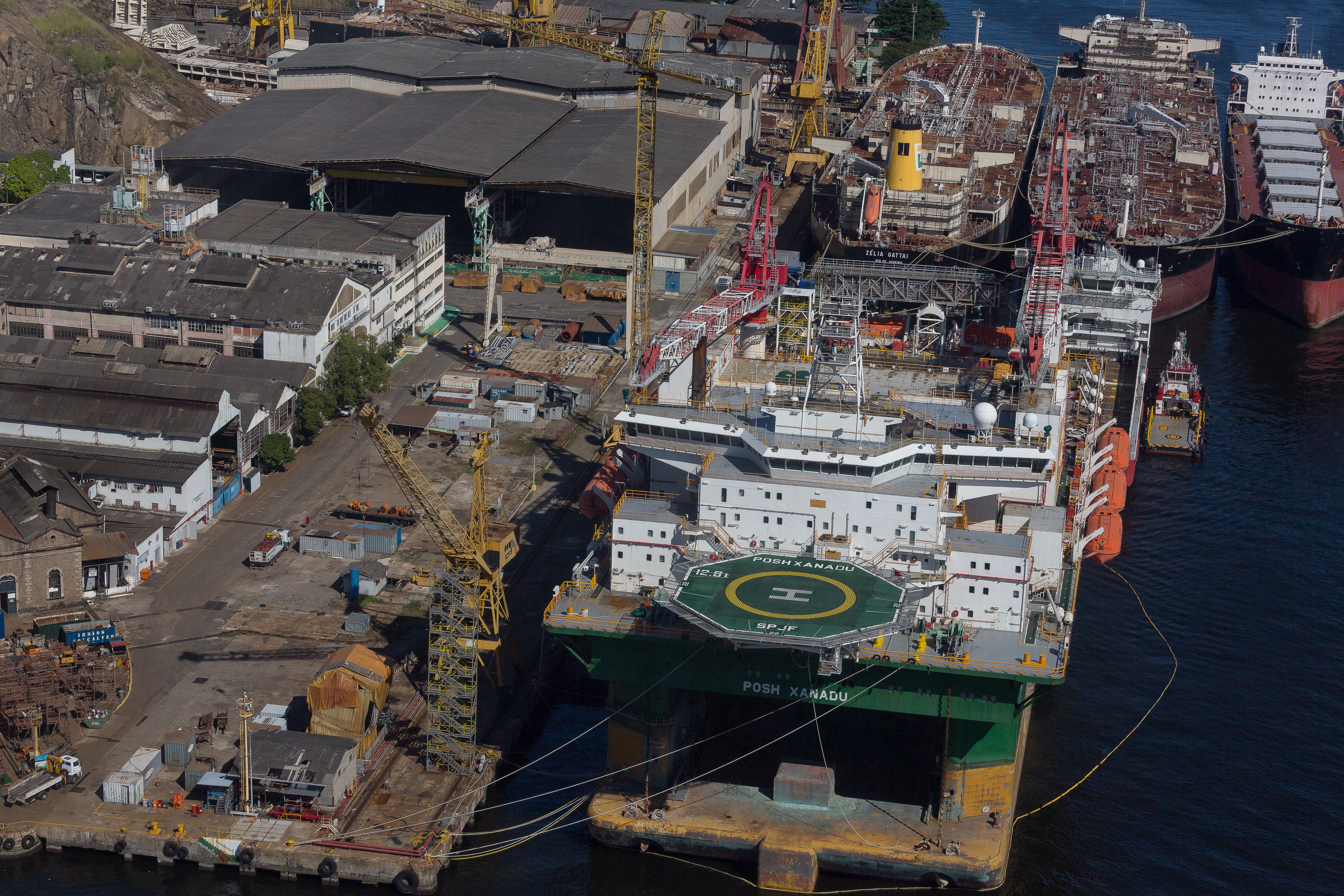
Mauá Shipyard, Niterói, Rio de Janeiro

Brazil's naval industry is historically concentrated in the state of Rio de Janeiro. 26 shipyards were in operation in 2010, of which 15 were in Rio. 152 projects were under construction in 2016, mostly barges and towboats (82 units), followed by oil tankers, offshore support vessels, tugboats, oil platforms, submarines and gas tankers. The industry is labor-intensive and each direct job may indirectly create another five. Shipyards employed 21 thousand workers in 2019, a major drop from the 82 thousand in 2014, but the sector was recovering.

At the peak of shipbuilding, ships flying the national flag provided 17.6% of international freight in 1974. Production began to decline in the 1980s and growth was only regained in the 21st century, driven by the oil industry's demand. National-flagged vessels couldn't compete after deregulation and the lifting of protectionist policies, and local shipbuilding costs remained higher than in other countries with greater labor and energy prices.

==== Tourism ====
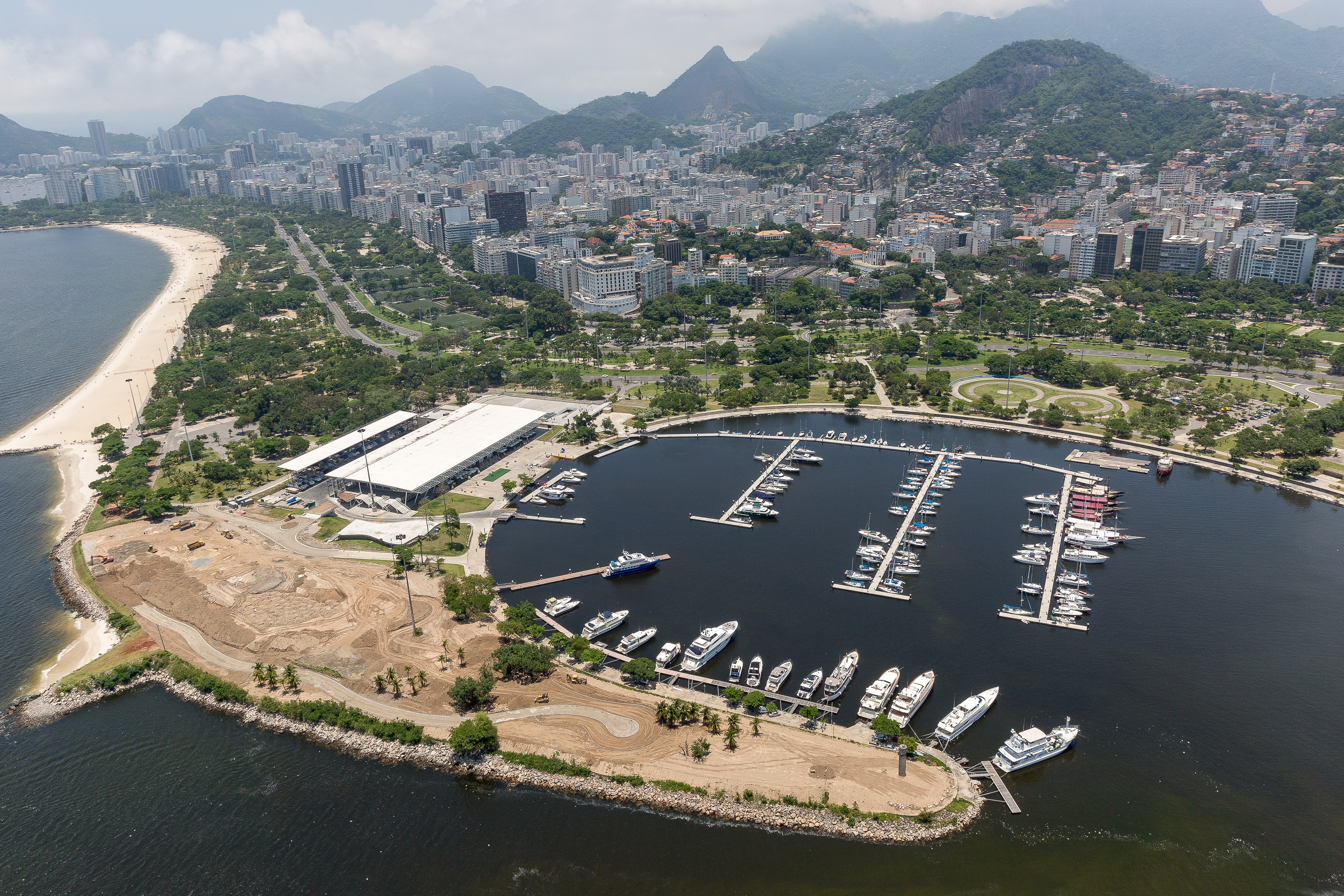
Marina da Glória, Rio de Janeiro

Nautical tourism provided for R$12.6 billion of Brazil's 2023 GDP, only accounting for travel and sports in speedboats, sailboats, yachts, jets and similar craft. The boat sector created 150 thousand direct and indirect jobs. The cruise ship sector added a further R$5 billion and 80 thousand jobs in the 2023/2024 season. More broadly, coastal tourism also includes beaches, bathing resorts and diving) and their infrastructure: hotels, food, recreation, sporting equipment and marinas. Brazilian attractions in this sector are the vast coastline and internal waters, its climate and its scenery, with tropical and subtropical white sand beaches and, further south, coastal mountains. A deficit of cruise ship vacancies in the 2023/2024 season suggests an untapped potential, but insufficient docks are a major shortcoming.

==== Mining ====
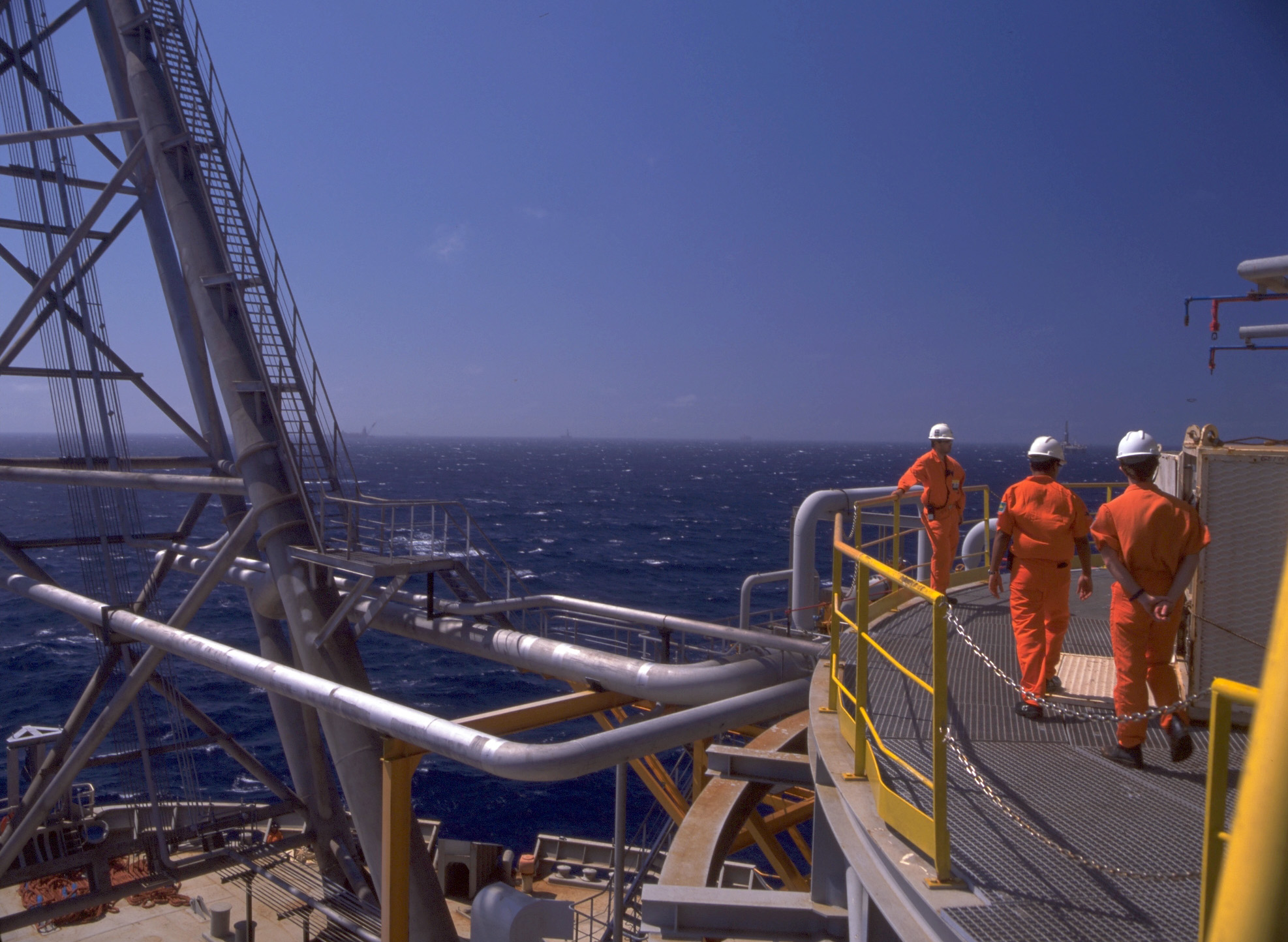
Petrobras oil rig workers

Oil and natural gas are among Brazil's chief interests in the sea, since the 1970s and even more after discoveries in the pre-salt layer of coastal sedimentary basins in the 2000s. Most national production of these resources takes place beneath jurisdictional waters; production was largest in the states of São Paulo, Rio de Janeiro and Espírito Santo. Brazil was the world's 8th largest crude oil and lease condensate producer in 2023. Supply exceeds domestic demand, but the country still imports crude oil and its derivatives for lack of refining capacity.

The South Atlantic's seabed and subsoil are also a new frontier for underwater mining. Coal, gas hydrates, aggregates, heavy mineral sands, phosphorites, evaporites, sulphur, cobalt-rich ferromanganese crusts, polymetallic sulfides and polymetallic nodules have been prospected in the Brazilian continental shelf. In the moment, this sector is of little relevance. As of 2019, the only 11 mining titles registered at the National Mining Agency for underwater mining referred to limestone and shelly limestone extraction.

==== Renewable energy ====
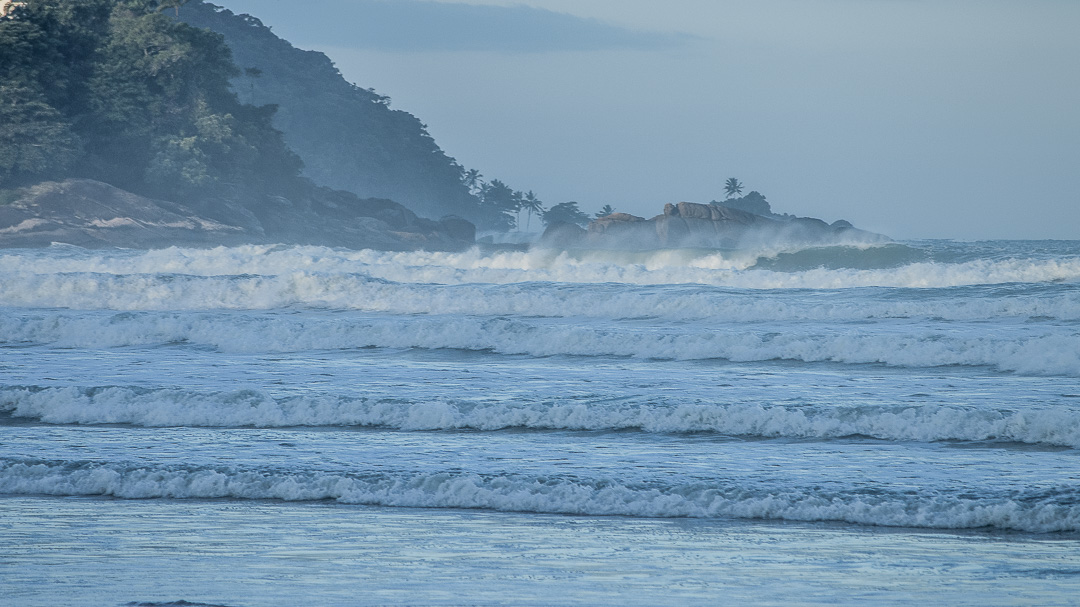
Waves in Ubatuba, São Paulo

The Brazilian coast has an untapped potential in renewable energy generation from its tides, waves, winds and osmotic and thermal gradients. Total tidal and wave generation potential was estimated at 114 GW in 2022. Viable sites for tidal power generation are in the Northern region and Maranhão, while wave power is possible in the remaining coastal states. Vertical temperature gradients may be studied for ocean thermal energy conversion in oceanic islands and the middle continental shelves of Santa Catarina and Rio de Janeiro. Usable osmotic gradients may be found in major estuarine systems such as the Amazon Delta and Patos Lagoon.

Offshore wind power potential was estimated in 2024 at 480 GW over fixed foundations (at maximum depths of 70 m) and 748 with floating wind turbines. Major urban centers such as Fortaleza, Rio de Janeiro and Porto Alegre are close to the main potential wind power areas, with the greatest potential in the South. However, initial costs would be high and a significant scale of production would only be achieved with significant investments in the transmission network, port infrastructure and manufacturing capacity. For comparison, Brazil's electrical grid had 200 GW of centralized power in 2024, primarily sourced from hydroelectric power.

==== Fishing ====
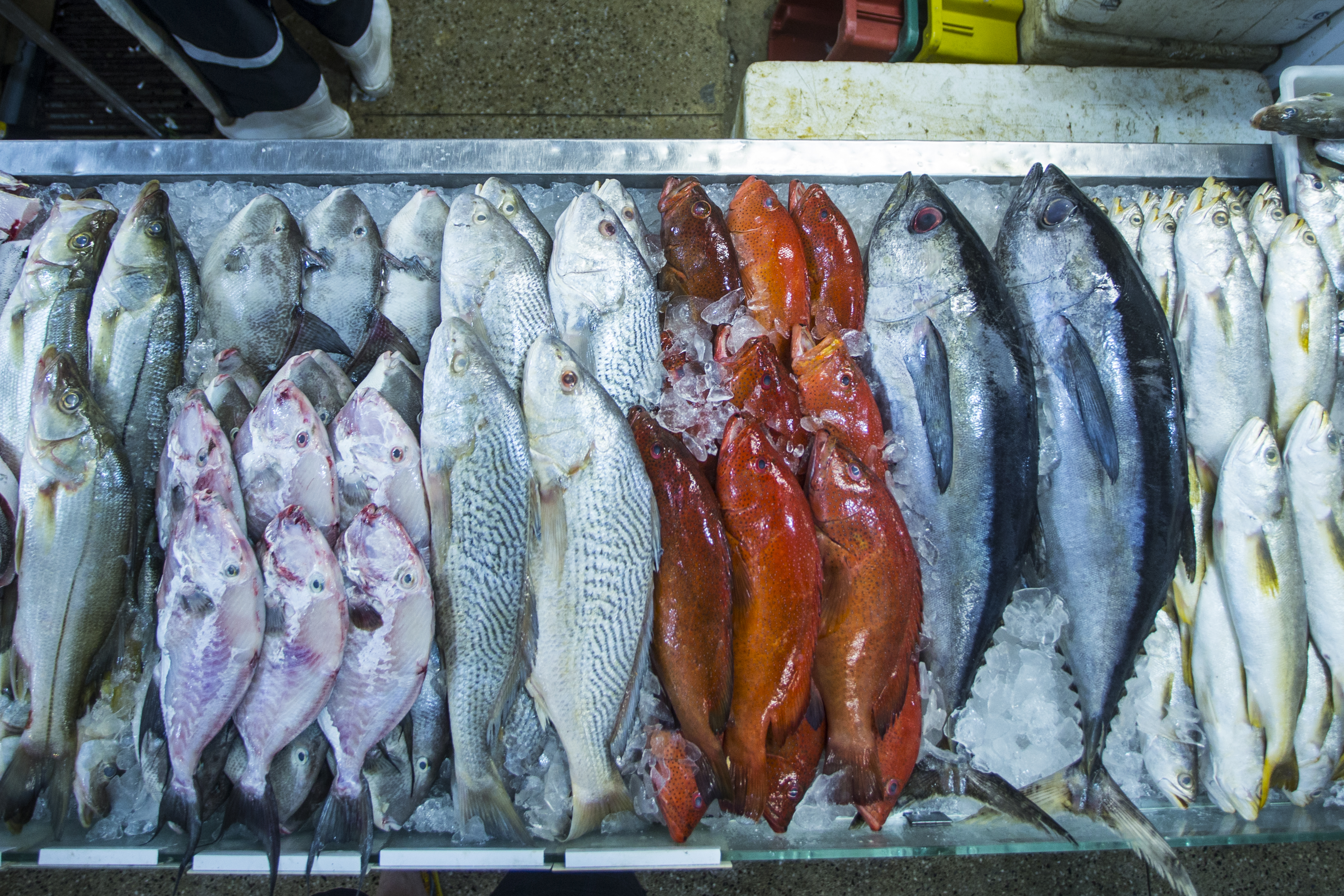
Fish at a market in Vitória, Espírito Santo

Brazil historically provides little more than 0.5% of global marine fishing output. The United Nations Food and Agriculture Organization accounted for a national fishing production of 758 thousand tons in 2022, out of a global total of 91.029 million. Over 30% of captures take place in rivers and lakes. Brazil also produced 738 thousand tons from aquaculture out of a global total of 94.413 million. Export-focused industrial fishing developed in the country since the 1960s, driven by a mistaken belief that fish stocks would be endless. The vast oceanic area under national jurisdiction does not by itself make the country a fishing power, as already mentioned oceanographic conditions do not produce a large biomass of fish.

Fish stocks were comprehensively surveyed by the Program for Evaluation of the Sustainable Potential of Living Resources in the Exclusive Economic Zone of Brazil (Programa de Avaliação do Potencial Sustentável de Recursos Vivos na Zona Econômica Exclusiva do Brasil, ReviZEE), a decentralized, multidisciplinary effort undertaken in 1996–2005. As of its conclusion, 69% of marine fish output consisted of eight families: pescadas and corvinas (Sciaenidae), sardines (Clupeidae), tunas and related fish (Scombridae), shrimp (Penaeidae), catfish (Ariidae) , tainhas (Mugilidae), arabaianas, xaréus, xareletes, garajubas and other fish of the Carangidae family and red fishes of the Lutjanidae family. Most species targeted by coastal and continental fisheries were over-exploited and there was no perspective of increased production. Oceanic fisheries had greater potential, but even then, stocks were nearing the limits of sustainable exploitation. Even at deeper waters inaccessible to traditional fleets, stocks have limited potential. The greatest long-term potential for growth lies in aquaculture, including mariculture in the coast's many bays and bights.

Fishing and aquaculture provide little more than 0.5% of national GDP, though they are relevant at the local level, creating 3.5 million direct and indirect jobs, mostly from artisanal fishermen and their families. Out of an estimated fleet of 21,732 boats in 2019, most had less than 12 meters in length and only a third were motorized. Industrial fishing is concentrated in the South and Southeast. Fish are not central to the Brazilian diet: annual per capita consumption stood at 9.5 kg in 2020, below the global average of 20 kg. Even then, production does not meed demand in 2022 Brazil was among the world's 11 largest fish importers.

==== Biotechnology ====
Besides fishing, another category of living resources is biotechnology, which takes advantage of molecules and genes from marine microorganisms. In the South Atlantic, research in this area focuses on hydrolytic enyzmes and bioremediation. The Brazilian state promotes a prospection program, Biomar, since 2005. This activity has next to no environmental impacts, but the industrialization of marine biotechnological products was still distant as of 2020.

=== Environmental policy ===
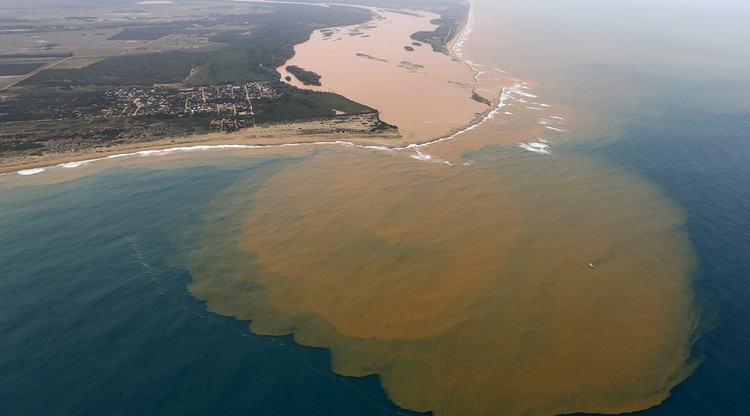
Contaminated water discharges into the sea through the Doce River after the Mariana dam disaster

Brazilian marine ecosystems are under pressure from industrial fishing, navigation, port and land pollution, coastal development, mining, oil and gas extraction, invasive species and climate change. Industrial, mining, agriculture, pharmaceutical, sanitary and other residues drain into the sea from the continent. A particularly serious case was the Mariana dam disaster, which led to mining residues with a high concentration of iron, aluminum, manganese, arsenic, mercury and other metals crossing over 600 km through the Doce River until meeting the sea. Oil spills are the most visible type of pollution, of which the largest case took place in the Northeastern coast in 2019. Global ocean acidification may impede biogenic calficication in Espírito Santo and the Abrolhos Bank and dissolve existing shells and skeletons, releasing carbon dioxide. In the South Atlantic, increasing seawater surface temperatures will tend to weaken the Falkland Current, displacing the Brazil-Falkland Confluence to the south.

Marine environmental management falls upon a mesh of policies, norms, programs and agencies. Enforcement is assigned to the Brazilian Institute of Environment and Renewable Natural Resources (IBAMA) and the Navy. 27.6% of the territorial sea and 26.4% of the EEZ, or 26.5% of these areas in total, were protected under 190 conservation units in 2021. Coastal areas had a further 549 units. Until 2020, when environmental protection areas were decreed in the archipelagos of Saint Peter and Saint Paul and Trindade and Martim Vaz, conservation unit coverage in the EEZ did not exceed 1.5%. This measure allowed Brazil to announce its full implementation of Aichi Target 11, the protection of at least 10% of coastal and marine areas, which it had committed itself to fulfill in 2010, as a party to the Convention on Biological Diversity.

However, full (no-take) protection coverage stood at only 2.5%. The Ministry of the Environment had as its target to extend this number to 10% in the following 15 years. Unprotected areas that could be given priority include reefs at the edge of the Amazonic continental shelf, shallow waters of the North Brazilian Chain, the southern part of the Abrolhos Bank and, in the South, deep-water coral reefs, rhodolith beds and mobile bottom benthic communities. The most serious overlap between risk factors and biodiversity is at areas in the Southeast and southern Bahia, to a total of 83 thousand km^{2}. This conclusion was published in the journal Diversity and Distributions in 2021, based on the distribution of 143 animal species with critically endangered, endangered or vulnerable conservation status. Its authors contend that the criteria for existing areas have been more opportunistic and political than biologica. The archipelagos of Saint Peter and Saint Paul and Trindade and Martim Vaz are remote areas and their conservation harms few economic interests, unlike the coast.

=== Security ===
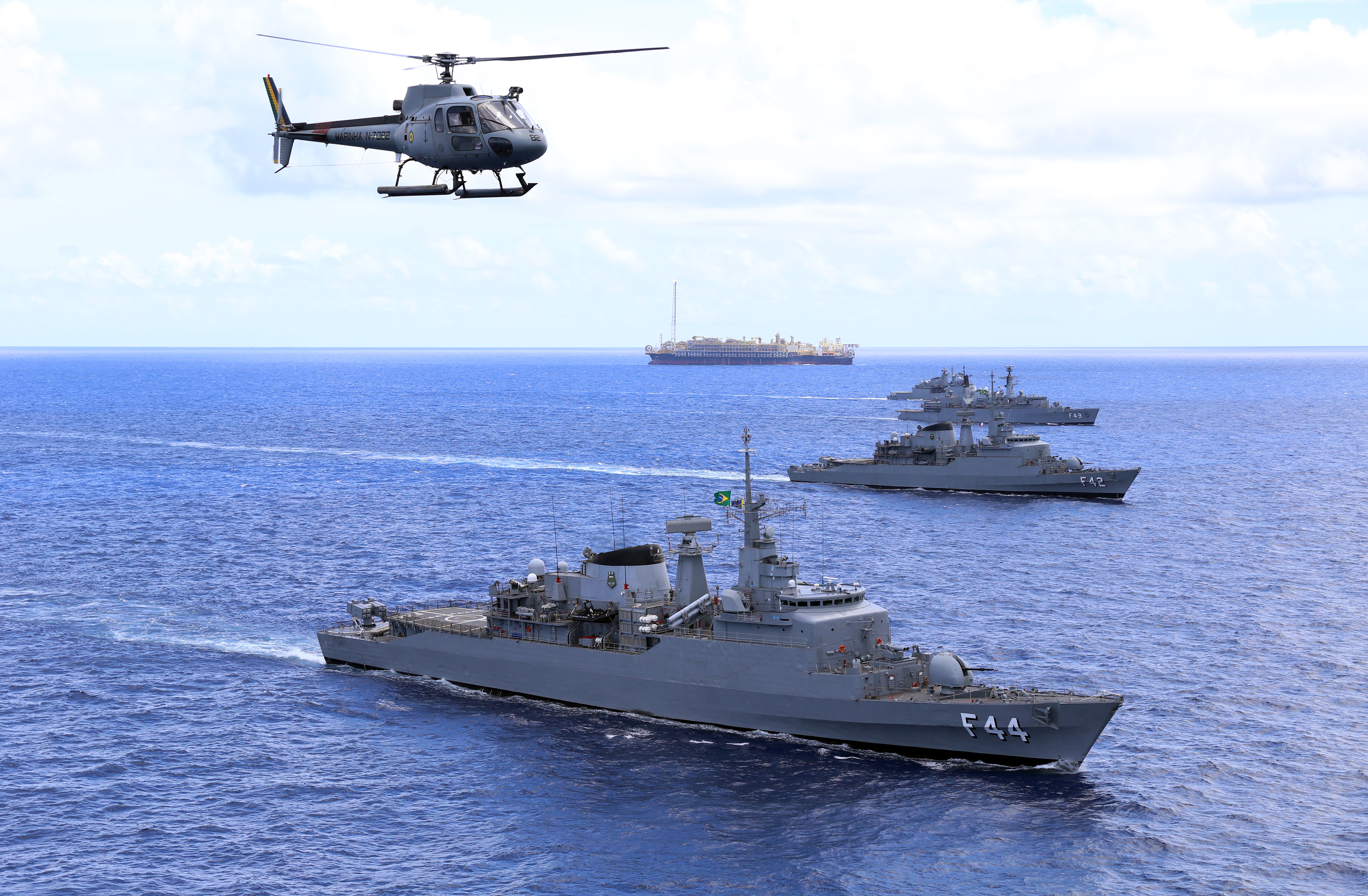
Niterói-class frigates sail past the FPSO MV26 Cidade de Itaguaí

The "Blue Amazon's" limits are imaginary lines over the sea and only physically exist insofar as they are patrolled by Brazilian ships. Jurisdictional waters are a border region and as such, must be monitored and if needed, denied access to external actors. This burden falls on the Armed Forces and particularly the Navy, in its "dual" nature, simultaneously tasked with police and war operations. There is no independent coast guard. In formal recognition of this role, the Navy Command is rewarded with some of the royalties of offshore oil extraction. The Brazilian Air Force aids the Navy's activities with its patrol aircraft. Brazil has further responsibilities of maritime search and rescue from the 7th parallel north to the 35th parallel south, as far east as the 10th meridian west.

The Navy's "coast guard" dimension is embodied in its Naval Districts, to which a considerable number of patrol vessels are assigned. The Navy's commander is the Brazilian Maritime Authority and as such is responsible for implementing and overseeing laws and regulations on the sea and interior waters, if needed by seizing foreign vessels which conduct unauthorized activities in any of the BJW's maritime zones and handing them to appropriate authorities.

In its warmaking dimension, the Navy is tasked with deterring foreign powers and, should war break out, to deny them use of the sea, control maritime areas and project power over land. Its priorities are the coastal strip between Santos and Vitória, the Amazon Delta, archipelagos, oceanic islands, oil rigs and naval and port installations. Naval strategic thought defines the Blue Amazon as the "vital area", the Atlantic from the 16th parallel north to Antarctica as the "primary area" and the Caribbean Sea and East Pacific Ocean as the "secondary area". In defense of its interests in the South Atlantic, Brazil has a two-pronged approach of military re-equipment and the development of closer ties with other states in the region.

== References and notes ==
=== Sources ===
- Abdenur, Adriana Erthal; Souza Neto, Danilo Marcondes de (November 2013). "Brazil's maritime strategy in the South Atlantic: the nexus between security and resources" (PDF). South African Institute of International Affairs (SAIIA) Occasional Paper (161).
- Almeida, Fernando Flávio Marques de (2006). "Ilhas oceânicas brasileiras e suas relações com a tectônica atlântica". Terrae Didatica. Vol. 2, no. 1. Unicamp.
- Andrade, Fábio da Silva (2009). O petróleo do pré-sal brasileiro: do direito de jurisdição as possíveis perspectivas de ameaças a soberania nacional (PDF) (Monograph). Escola de Guerra Naval.
- Andrade, Israel de Oliveira; Franco, Luiz Gustavo Aversa (2018). "A Amazônia Azul como fronteira marítima do Brasil: importância estratégica e imperativos para a Defesa Nacional". In Bolívar Pêgo (coord.) (ed.). Fronteiras do Brasil: uma avaliação de política pública, volume 1 (PDF). Rio de Janeiro: Instituto de Pesquisa Econômica Aplicada. ISBN 978-85-7811-337-7.
- Andrade, Israel de Oliveira; et al. (February 2022). "PIB do mar brasileiro, motivações sociais, econômicas e ambientais para sua mensuração e seu monitoramento" (PDF). Texto para discussão (2740). Brasília/Rio de Janeiro: Instituto de Pesquisa Econômica Aplicada. doi:10.38116/td2740.
- Avaliação do quantitativo de cargas transportados em embarcações nacionais em comparação com as estrangeiras autorizadas pela Antaq (PDF). Brasília: Agência Nacional de Transportes Aquaviários. 2022.
- Assumpção, Alexander Neves de (2018). Interpretações sobre as áreas de Jurisdição a partir da Costa: O conceito de Águas Jurisdicionais Brasileiras comparado a conceitos Análogos do Chile e Argentina (PDF) (Monograph). Escola de Guerra Naval.
- Bou-Haya, Catherine B.; Sato, Olga T. (2022). "The heat storage variability in the Brazil Current". Ocean and Coastal Research. 70 e22053. Bibcode:2022OCRes..70E2053B. doi:10.1590/2675-2824070.22006cbbh.
- Carvalho, Gustavo de Lemos Campos (June 1999). "O mar territorial brasileiro de 200 milhas: estratégia e soberania, 1970-1982". Revista Brasileira de Política Internacional. 42 (1). Centro de Estudos Globais da Universidade de Brasília: 110–126. doi:10.1590/S0034-73291999000100005.
- Carvalho, Andréa Bento (2018). Economia do mar: conceito, valor e importância para o Brasil (PDF) (Thesis). Programa de Pós-Graduação em Economia do Desenvolvimento da Pontifícia Universidade Católica do Rio Grande do Sul.
- Carvalho, Vinícius Mariano de (2022). "Beyond the Blue Amazon: the Brazilian vocation to the South Atlantic". Power and the Maritime Domain. Routledge. ISBN 978-1-003-29898-4.
- Castro, Belmiro M.; et al. (2017). "A Amazônia Azul: recursos e preservação". Revista USP (113): 7–26. doi:10.11606/issn.2316-9036.v0i113p7-26. Archived from the original on 2018-07-19.
- CEMBRA (2022). O Brasil e o mar no século XXI: Relatório aos tomadores de decisão do país (3rd ed.). Niterói: Centro de Excelência para o Mar Brasileiro. ISBN 978-65-991881-2-1.
- Centro de Gestão e Estudos Estratégicos (2008). Mar e ambientes costeiros (PDF). Brasília: Ministério da Ciência, Tecnologia e Inovação. ISBN 978-85-60755-05-9.
- Question of the delimitation of the continental shelf between Nicaragua and Colombia beyond 200 nautical miles from the Nicaraguan coast: rejoinder of the Republic of Colombia (PDF). International Court of Justice. 2019-02-11.
- Costa, José Augusto Fontoura (2017). "A Amazônia Azul e o domínio marítimo brasileiro". Revista USP (113): 27–44. doi:10.11606/issn.2316-9036.v0i113p27-44.
- Cunha, Roberto Gondim Carneiro da (2015). "Sistema de Gerenciamento da Amazônia Azul – perspectivas brasileiras" (PDF). Hemisferio. 1. Inter-American Defense College Publications.
- Duarte, Regina Horta; Horta, Güydo Campos Machado Marques (July–September 2012). "Barth e an ilha da Trindade, 1957-1959". História, Ciências, Saúde - Manguinhos. 19 (3): 951–968. doi:10.1590/S0104-59702012000300010.
- Figueirôa, Christiano Sávio Barros (2014). Limites exteriores da plataforma continental do Brasil conforme o direito do mar (PDF). Brasília: FUNAG. ISBN 978-85-7631-523-0. Archived from the original (PDF) on 2015-06-01.
- Food and Agriculture Organization of the United Nations (2024). The state of world fisheries and aquaculture 2024. Blue transformation in action. Roma: FAO. ISBN 978-92-5-138763-4.
- Freitas, Wilmar Terroso (2008). A aviação de patrulha e a defesa dos interesses brasileiros na Amazônia azul: uma reflexão (Dissertation). Programa de Pós-Graduação em Ciências Aeroespaciais da Universidade da Força Aérea.
- Magris, Rafael A.; et al. (February 2021). "A blueprint for securing Brazil's marine biodiversity and supporting the achievement of global conservation goals". Diversity and Distributions. 27 (2): 198–215. Bibcode:2021DivDi..27..198M. doi:10.1111/ddi.13183. hdl:10536/DRO/DU:30154842.
- Maia, Felipe Malachini (2020). O Brasil no Mar: um panorama sobre as potenciais ameaças ao seu entorno estratégico e à Amazônia Azul (PDF) (Dissertation). Escola de Guerra Naval.
- Marreiro, Matheus Moraes Alves (2021). As representações espaciais e a geopolítica popular no Brasil: o Atlântico Sul como uma geografia imaginativa (PDF) (Dissertation). Programa de Pós-Graduação em Segurança Internacional e Defesa da Escola Superior de Guerra.
- Mendes, Andrea Ribeiro (2006). A Constituição das fronteiras marítimas brasileiras: do "Mar Territorial" à "Amazônia Azul" (PDF) (Dissertation). Escola Nacional de Ciências Estatísticas.
- Miloslavich, Patricia; et al. (2011). "Marine biodiversity in the Atlantic and Pacific coasts of South America: knowledge and gaps". PLOS ONE. 6 (1) e14631. Bibcode:2011PLoSO...614631M. doi:10.1371/journal.pone.0014631. hdl:11336/99871. PMC 3031619. PMID 21304960.
- Mohriak, Webster Ueipass; Torres, Luiz Carlos (2017). "Levantamentos geofísicos para a delimitação da margem continental brasileira". Revista USP (113): 59–80. doi:10.11606/issn.2316-9036.v0i113p59-80. Archived from the original on 2018-07-23.
- Nóbrega, Elisabeth (August 2008). "Evolução e perspectivas de desenvolvimento da Marinha Mercante brasileira". Textos para discussão (45). Brasília: Consultoria Legislativa do Senado Federal.
- Pinho, Roberto de; Turra, Alexander; Andrade, Jailson Bittencourt de (April–June 2021). "A ciência oceânica no Brasil e desafios transversais para a produção do conhecimento" (PDF). Ciência e Cultura. 73 (2). São Paulo: Sociedade Brasileira para o Progresso da Ciência: 07–11. doi:10.21800/2317-66602021000200003. ISSN 2317-6660.
- Salles, Felipe; Galante, Alexandre (2023). "The Brazilian Navy entering its third century". In Conrad Waters (ed.). Seaforth World Naval Review 2024. Pen & Sword. ISBN 978-1-3990-2312-2.
- Serafim, Carlos Frederico Simões (coord.) (2005). O mar no espaço geográfico brasileiro (PDF). Brasília: Ministério da Educação. ISBN 85-98171-20-4.
- Serafim, Carlos Frederico Simões (2007). "REVIZEE - missão cumprida?". Revista Brasileira de Engenharia de Pesca. 2 (1). Archived from the original on 2024-09-06.
- Silva, Gilberto Maciel da (January–June 2010). "Marinha Mercante brasileira: contribuição para o desenvolvimento e a segurança nacionais". Revista da Escola Superior de Guerra. 25 (51).
- Silva, Alexandre Pereira da (2017). "Brazil's recent agenda on the sea and the South Atlantic contemporary scenario". Marine Policy. 85 (85): 25–32. Bibcode:2017MarPo..85...25D. doi:10.1016/j.marpol.2017.08.010.
- Silva, Alexandre Pereira da (2019). "Brazilian large-scale marine protected areas: Other "paper parks"?". Ocean and Coastal Management. 169 (169): 104–112. Bibcode:2019OCM...169..104P. doi:10.1016/j.ocecoaman.2018.12.012.
- Silva, Alexandre Pereira da (2020a). "The concept of Brazilian Jurisdictional Waters and its impact on the freedom of the high seas". The International Journal of Marine and Coastal Law. 35 (35): 295–324. doi:10.1163/15718085-12341003.
- Silva, Alexandre Pereira da (2020b). "From rocks to an archipelago: the Brazilian interpretation and application of Article 121 of the United Nations Convention on the Law of the Sea with respect to the St. Peter and St. Paul insular features". Ocean Development & International Law. 51 (4): 330–357. doi:10.1080/00908320.2020.1820153.
- Souza, Jairo M. de (March 1999). "Mar territorial, zona econômica exclusiva ou plataforma continental?". Revista Brasileira de Geofísica. 17: 79–82. doi:10.1590/S0102-261X1999000100007. ISSN 0102-261X.
- Sumida, Paulo Yukio Gomes; Bernardino, Angelo Fraga; De Léo, Fabio Cabrera (2020). Brazilian deep-sea biodiversity. Springer. ISBN 978-3-030-53222-2.
- Ventura, Victor Alencar Mayer Feitosa (2020). Environmental Jurisdiction in the Law of the Sea: the Brazilian Blue Amazon. Springer. ISBN 978-3-030-50543-1.
- Violante, Alexandre Rocha (2022). "Amazônia Azul". In Silva, Francisco Carlos Teixeira da (org.) (ed.). Dicionário de história militar do Brasil (1822-2022): volume I. Rio de Janeiro: Autografia. ISBN 978-85-518-4909-5.
- Weiss, James (April 2018). "Rise and decline of shipbuilding industry in Brazil". 27th International Conference on Management of Technology. Birmingham, UK.
- Zanella, Tiago V. (2018). "Águas Jurisdicionais Brasileiras: um estudo sobre a (i)legalidade do conceito de AJB)" (PDF). Revista Jurídica Luso-Brasileira (6). Lisboa: Centro de Investigação de Direito Privado.
