= Uruguay - Buenos Aires Shelf marine ecoregion =

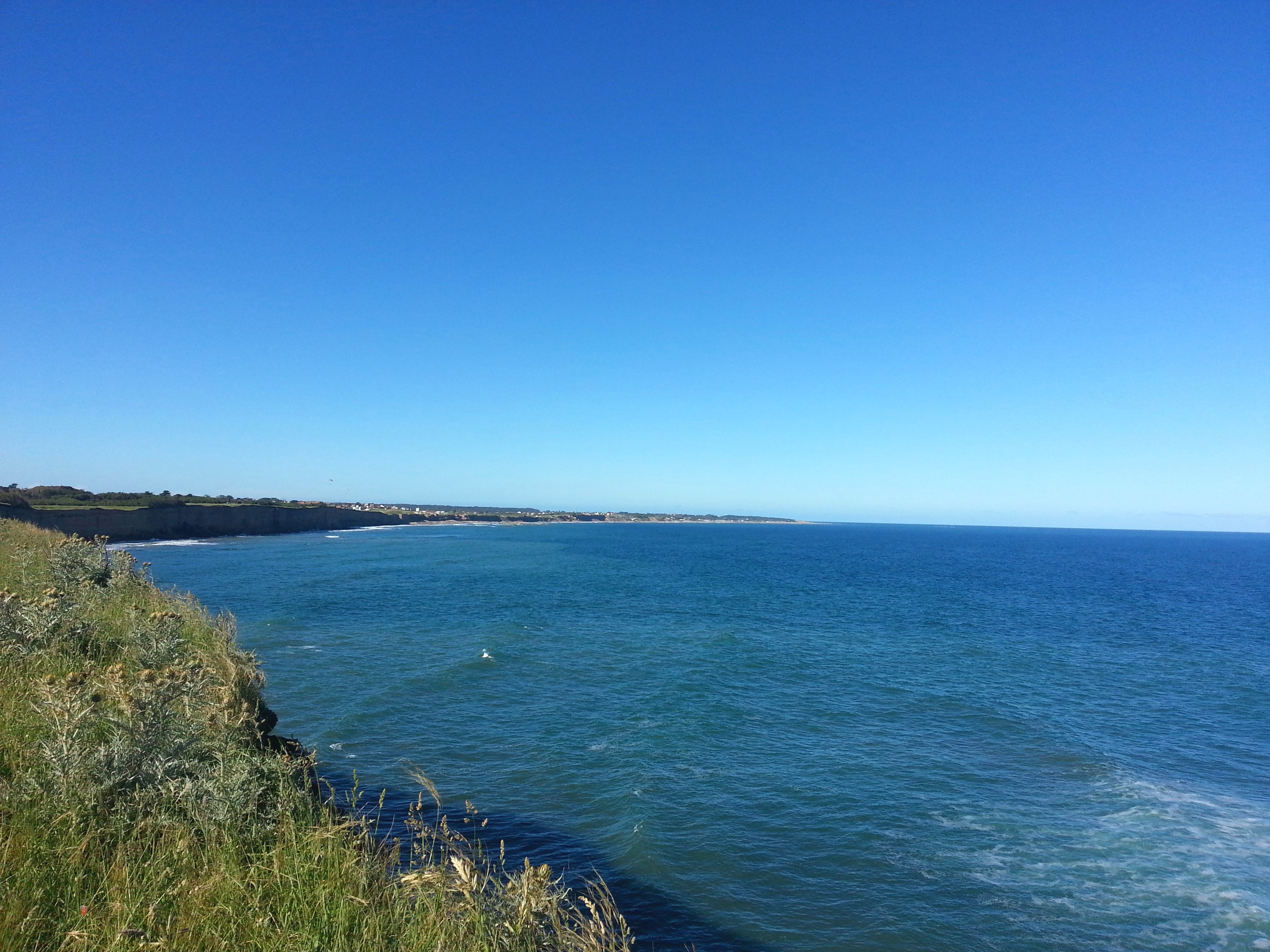
- Coastal cliffs at Mar del Plata, Argentina

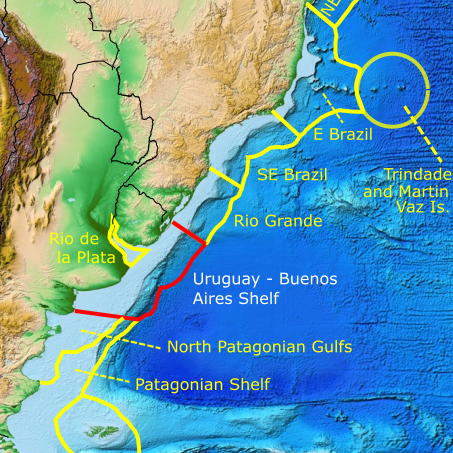
- Marine ecoregion boundaries (red line)

Ecology
- Realm: Temperate South America
- Province: Warm Temperate Southwest Atlantic
- Borders (marine): Rio Grande marine ecoregion, Rio de la Plata marine ecoregion, North Patagonian Gulfs marine ecoregion, and Patagonian Shelf marine ecoregion

Geography
- Country: Uruguay, Argentina

The Uruguay - Buenos Aires Shelf marine ecoregion covers waters offshore of Uruguay, the mouth of the Rio de la Plata), and Buenos Aires Province of Argentina. It has an area of 258,490 square kilometres (99,800 mi^{2}) and a coastline of 1,300 kilometres (810 mi). Marine biodiversity is very high due to the mixing of currents (the "Brazil-Falkland Confluence"), the mixing of fresh and salt water, the mixing of temperatures, and the broad, shallow continental shelf. Large amounts of nutrients arrive from the northwest flowing Malvinas Current and from the continental runoff of the Rio de la Plata. Aside from high populations of fish there are colonies of marine mammals, sea turtles, and seabirds.

The region is of particular conservation concern because this elevated biodiversity is combined with pollution and development of the nearby ports and cities, and a warming trend in the surface currents. The ecoregion is in the Warm Temperate Southwest Atlantic marine province. It is thus part of the Temperate South America realm. .

== Physical setting ==
The ecoregion reaches out into the Atlantic Ocean for 200 miles from the coast. The ecoregion is bounded on the north at the Uruguay-Brazil border (latitude 34°S), and stretches for 1,740 kilometres (1,080 mi) to the south at the mouth of Rio Negro (latitude 41°S). The bordering coast is generally sandy beach, a string of coastal lagoons, and scrub shrub; the terrestrial interior is the Uruguayan savanna ecoregion. South of the Rio de la Plata, the coast becomes dunes and cliffs fronting the flat grassland of the Humid Pampas. The major rivers feeding the marine region include the Rio de la Plata and its tributaries, the estuary of Bahía Blanca, and Rio Negro.

The continental shelf along this coast of Uruguay and Argentina extends about 200 km out to sea. The deepest point in the ecoregion overall is −1,003 metres (−3,291 ft), and the average is 68 metres (223 ft).

== Currents and climate ==
The cold, nutrient-rich Malvinas Current (MC) (also called the Falkland Current) flows north into the region in a 100-km wide band over the Patagonian Shelf. At the northern end of the Uruguay-Buenos Aires Shelf ecoregion, the MC meets the warm Brazil Current flowing down from the north. Measurements of the MC flow rate is highly variable, depending on the location ranging from 10 Sverdrups (Sv) to 88 Sv. The velocity also varies, with a typical surface drift of 40 centimetres per second (0.89 mph). Mean surface temperatures are 6 °C (43 °F).

== Animals / Fish ==
The marine life of the ecoregion have warm-temperate affinities. The most commercially important fish are the white mouth croaker (genus Micropogonias), striped weakfish (Cynoscion guatucupa), and among the cephalopods the shortfin squid (Illex argentinus).

Three species of marine mammals of conservation concern are subject to incidental catch (bycatch) of the region's fisheries - the Franciscana dolphin (Pontoporia blainvillei), South American sea lion (Otaria flavescens), and the South American fur seal (Arctocephalus australis).

== Conservation status ==
Many of the terrestrial protected areas on the coast have marine components, such that about 3% of the ecoregion is protected, including:

- Cabo Polonio National Park, an area of sand dunes home to a colony of sea lions.
- Laguna de Rocha Protected Area.

A particular concern in the region is the "tropicalization" of the marine life, as the warm Brazil Current appears to be drifting south. This may be leading the replacement of cold-water species with warm water species in the convergence zone.
