= Rio de la Plata marine ecoregion =

Tropical marine ecoregion

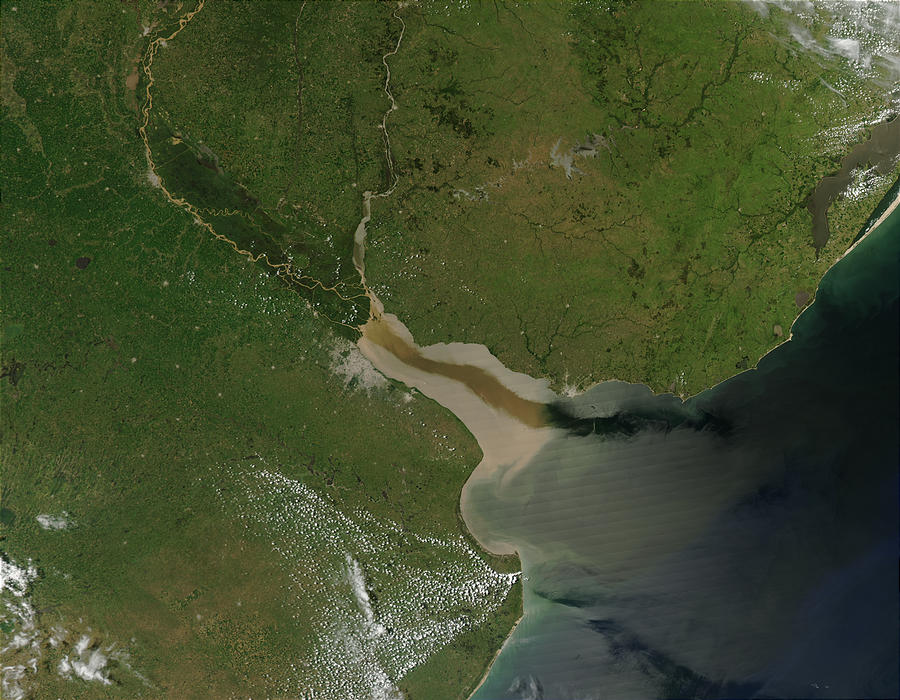
- Buenos Aires is in northwest of the bay. Note the turbidity front, and freshwater flow channels.

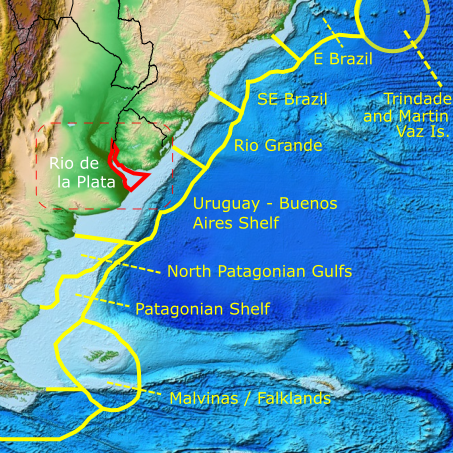
- Marine ecoregion boundaries (inside red line)

Ecology
- Realm: Temperate South America
- Province: Warm Temperate Southwestern Atlantic

Geography
- Country: Uruguay, Argentina

The Rio de la Plata marine ecoregion covers the mouth of the Rio de la Plata, between the shores of Argentina an Uruguay and inshore of the continental shelf of the Uruguay - Buenos Aires Shelf marine ecoregion. The ecoregion is an important reproductive and nursery ground for marine life, as the river runoff provides nutrients for larval and juvenile phases, the shallow and protective waters admit light, and there is of mixing fresh and salt waters. The region is in the Warm Temperate Southwest Atlantic marine province, a part of the Tropical Atlantic realm. .

== Physical setting ==
The ecoregion's eastern boundary is a line across the mouth of the river where it meets the sea, with Punta del Este, Uruguay on the north and San Clemente del Tuyú on Cape San Antonio, Argentina on the south. The ecoregion reaches 450 km to the west, up the Uruguay River to Nuevo Berlín, Uruguary. The terrestrial ecoregion to the north is the Uruguayan savanna, to the south is the Humid Pampas; on the west upstream of the estuary is the Paraná flooded savanna. The major rivers feeding the Rio de la Plata are the Paraná River and the Uruguay River, with annual average discharges of 16,000 and 6,000 m2/s, respectively. The bay itself is shallow with a flat sediment bottom crossed by channels (particularly along the Uruguary side) and sediment bars (facing Buenos Aires).

The ecoregion covers 32,015 square kilometres (12,361 mi^{2}). The deepest point is −39 metres (−128 ft), and the average depth is 8.4 metres (28 ft).

== Currents and climate ==
The main current is the freshwater flow of the rivers from the interior. At the mouth of the ecoregion, the cold, nutrient-rich Malvinas Current (MC) (also called the Falkland Current) flows north in a 100-km wide band over the Patagonian Shelf. Immediately to the north, the MC meets the warm Brazil Current flowing down from the north.

== Animals / Fish ==
Species of freshwater and mixohaline (brackish) types are affected by two large flow corridors of the tributary rivers. The freshwaters of the Paraná River flow along the Argentine coast on the south, while a corridor of the Uruguay River runs along the Uruguay side on the north. There is a narrow mixing corridor of the two, and the salinity front (located in a band across the ecoregion's meeting the open ocean) shifts with the winds and seasons.

Black drum (Pogonias cromis), Whitemouth croaker (es:Micropogonias furnieri), and King Weakfish (Macrodon ancylodon) spawn in the bottom salinity front. Fish that take refuge in the mixed fresh and salt waters also include the Banded croaker (Paralonchurus brasiliensis) and various species of Flounder (genus Paralichthys).

The surface salinity front supports large numbers of Argentine anchovy (Engraulis anchoita) and Chub mackerel (Scomber japonicus). The turbidity front is located across the bay at about the midpoint of the ecoregion. Because of poor penetration of light in the turbidity front, species richness is low. But the species that do exist in the turbidity front are found in large numbers, notably zooplankton, Whitemouth croaker, and Menhaden (Brevoortia aurea). The salt marshes on the margins are characterized by burrowing crabs (Chasmagnathus granulata).

== Conservation status ==
The primary threats to the region are algae blooms, disruption of the benthic (bottom) habitats, and pollution. Some of the terrestrial protected areas on the coast have marine components, such that about 2% of the ecoregion is protected, including:

- Rincón de Ajó
- Humedales del Santa Lucia
