= Cabo Corrientes, Mar del Plata =

Cape in Buenos Aires Province, Argentina

Cabo Corrientes
- Cape
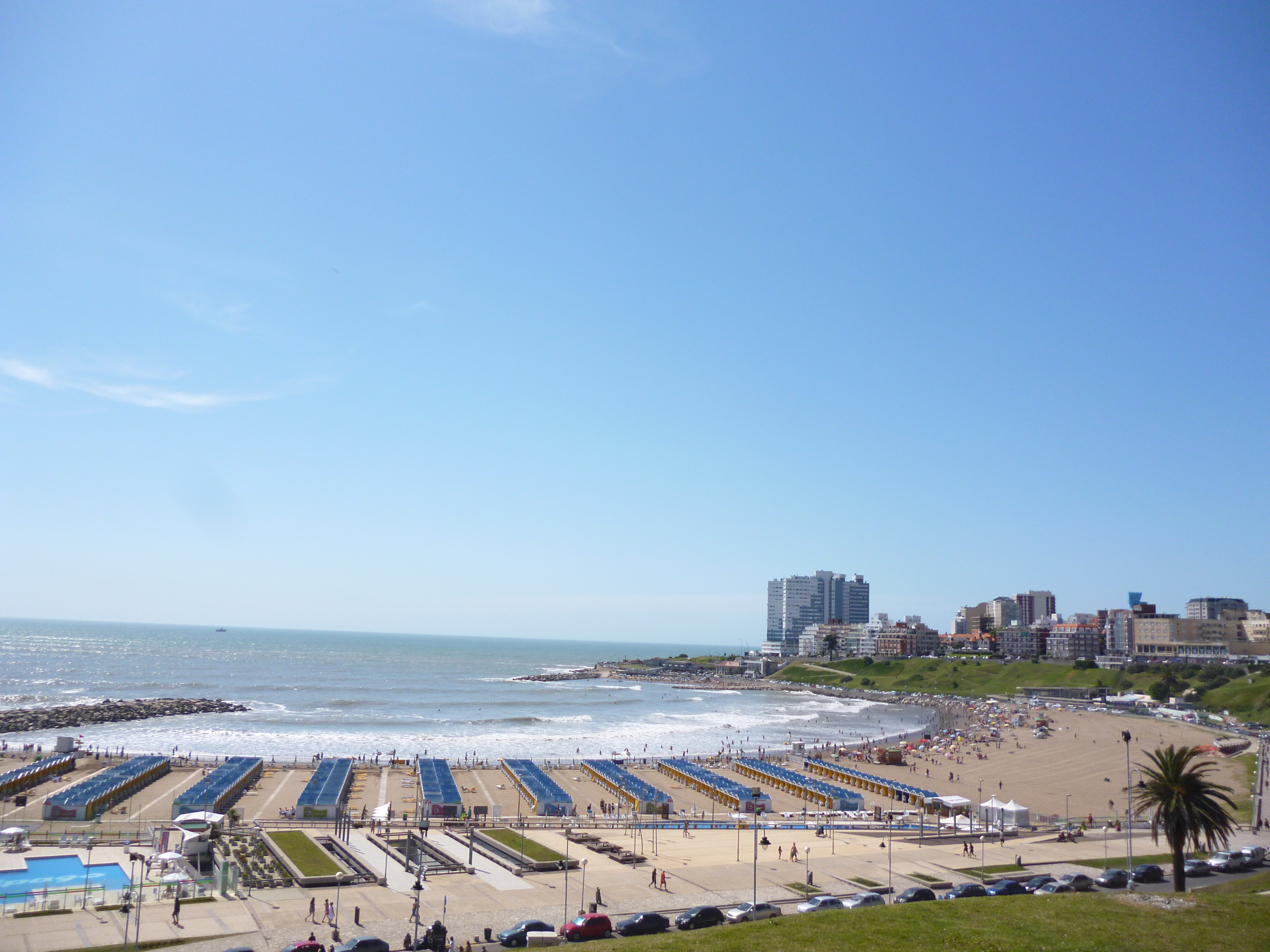
- View of Cabo Corrientes from the Varese beach

- Location within Argentina
- Coordinates: 38.016599°S 57.524278°W
- Location: Mar del Plata, General Pueyrredón Partido, Buenos Aires Province, Argentina
- Water bodies: Atlantic Ocean

Cabo Corrientes (Cape Currents) is a rocky outcrop on the Argentine coast between the Chica and Varese beaches in Mar del Plata, in the extreme southeast of Buenos Aires Province, on the Argentine Sea of the Atlantic Ocean. It is located at the geographical coordinates 38°01′S 57°32′W.

Cabo Corrientes was originally called Cabo de las Dos Corrientes (Cape of the Two Currents), since it is the point where a warm current from the tropical coast of Brazil (Brazil Current) converges with a current of frigid water from the Antarctic (Falklands Current).

== History ==
Sir Francis Drake in his 1577 circumnavigation voyage introduced Cabo Corrientes in the cartography of his time with the name Cape Lobos, due to the large colony of sea lions (lobos de mar in Spanish) in the area.

Admiral William Brown anchored at Cabo Corrientes in early January 1826 waiting for ships from Carmen de Patagones, which he would transfer to the Río de la Plata in mid-January and to participate in the naval campaign of the Cisplatine War. The national government had sent him to the aid of Buenos Aires because it had been blockaded on 21 December 1825 by a powerful squadron from the Brazilian Empire under the command of Vice Admiral Rodrigo José Ferreira de Lobo.

Pioneers slowly populated the region, including the lands around the cape. In 1847 the landowner José Gregorio de Lezama took advantage of the polítical situation in the Buenos Aires campaign and bought the lands of Ladislao Martínez Castro, among them the "Laguna de los Padres" ranch to the northwest of Cabo Corrientes. Due to his part on the Freemen of the South rebellion against Buenos Aires' governor Juan Manuel de Rosas, Martínez Castro was forced to sold their properties for a throw-away price, and all his cattle was confiscated. The rural estate occupied roughly the lands of the old Jesuit mission of Our Lady of the Pillar, that had operated from 13 November 1746 to 1 September 1751. In 1850 he also bought the "La Armonía" ranch, and in 1852 the "San Julián de Vivoratá" ranch.

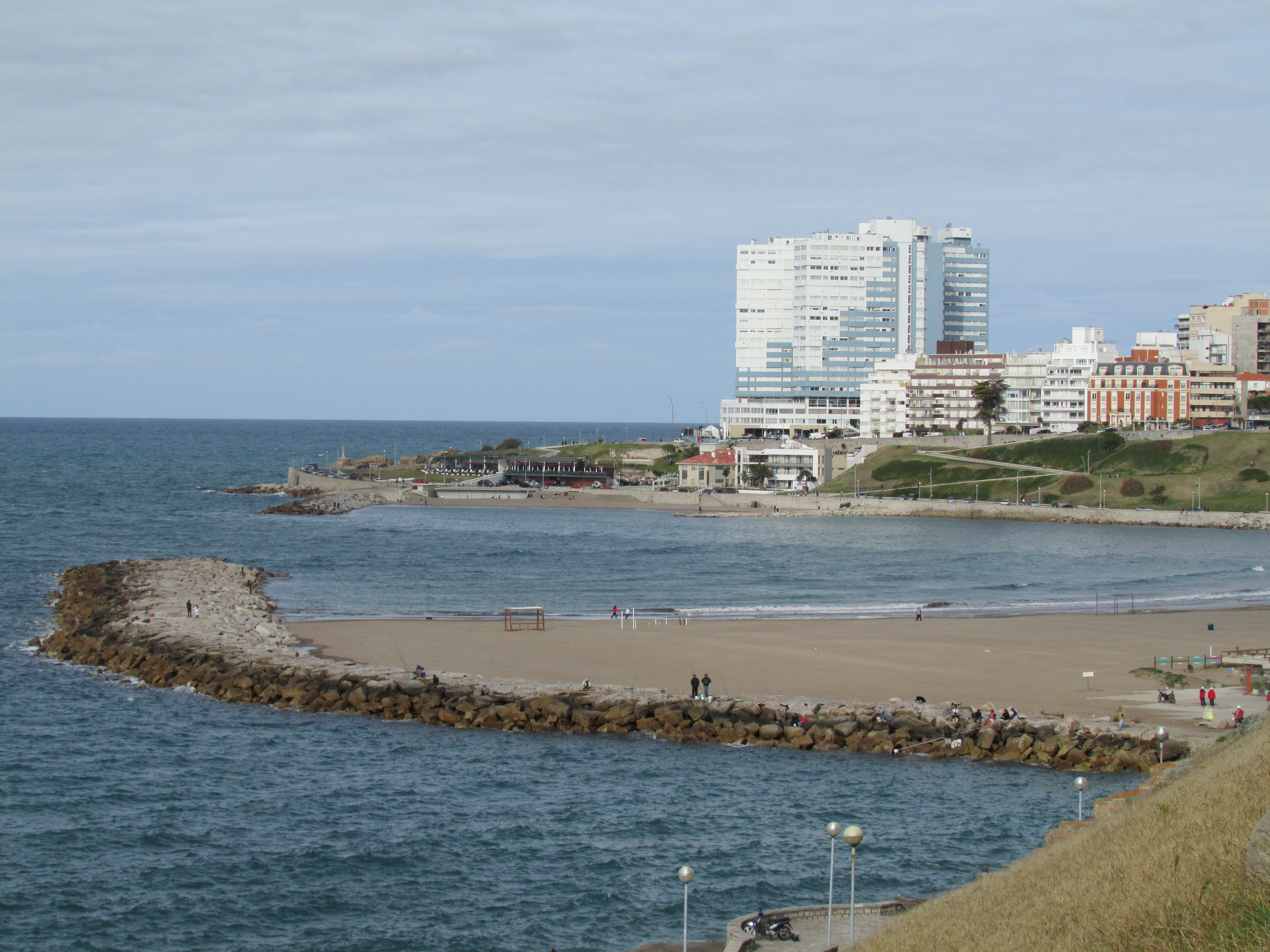
Cabo Corrientes, from the Northern side of Varese beach

José Gregorio de Lezama sold the three ranches in August 1856 (Note: According to the newspaper El Nacional of 14 August 1856 Meyrelles, a Portuguese entrepreneur, had just acquired the lands of the Laguna de los Padres.) to a Portuguese-Brazilian society consisting of Irineu Evangelista de Sousa, Viscount of Mauá, who kept 50%, the other half being evenly divided between Sa de Pereira, Pereira de Faria, Figueredo and the Portuguese José Coelho de Meyrelles, consul of the Kingdom of Portugal in Buenos Aires, who was put in charge of managing the ranches and establishing the first saladero in Cabo de las Corrientes, in the present Mar del Plata streets of Pedro Luro Avenue and Santiago del Estero, which formed the base of the future city of Mar del Plata. (Note: According to the Archives of the Department of Geodesy, Measure No. 1 of the General Pueyrredón Partido and No. 4 of Mar Chiquita Partido, Ministry of Public Works of the Province of Buenos Aires.) (Note: According to the Según el Archivo Histórico de la Provincia de Buenos Aires)

== Sources ==
- Crowder, Patricia; Isla, Fededico I.; Denegri, Guillermo; Farías, Alberto; Cermelo, Leonardo (2005), Mar del Plata: Fragilidad Costera, Argentina: MARTIN - Universidad Nacional de Mar del Plata
- Halperín Donghi, Tulio, La expansión ganadera en la campaña
