= North Patagonian Gulfs marine ecoregion =

Marine ecoregion

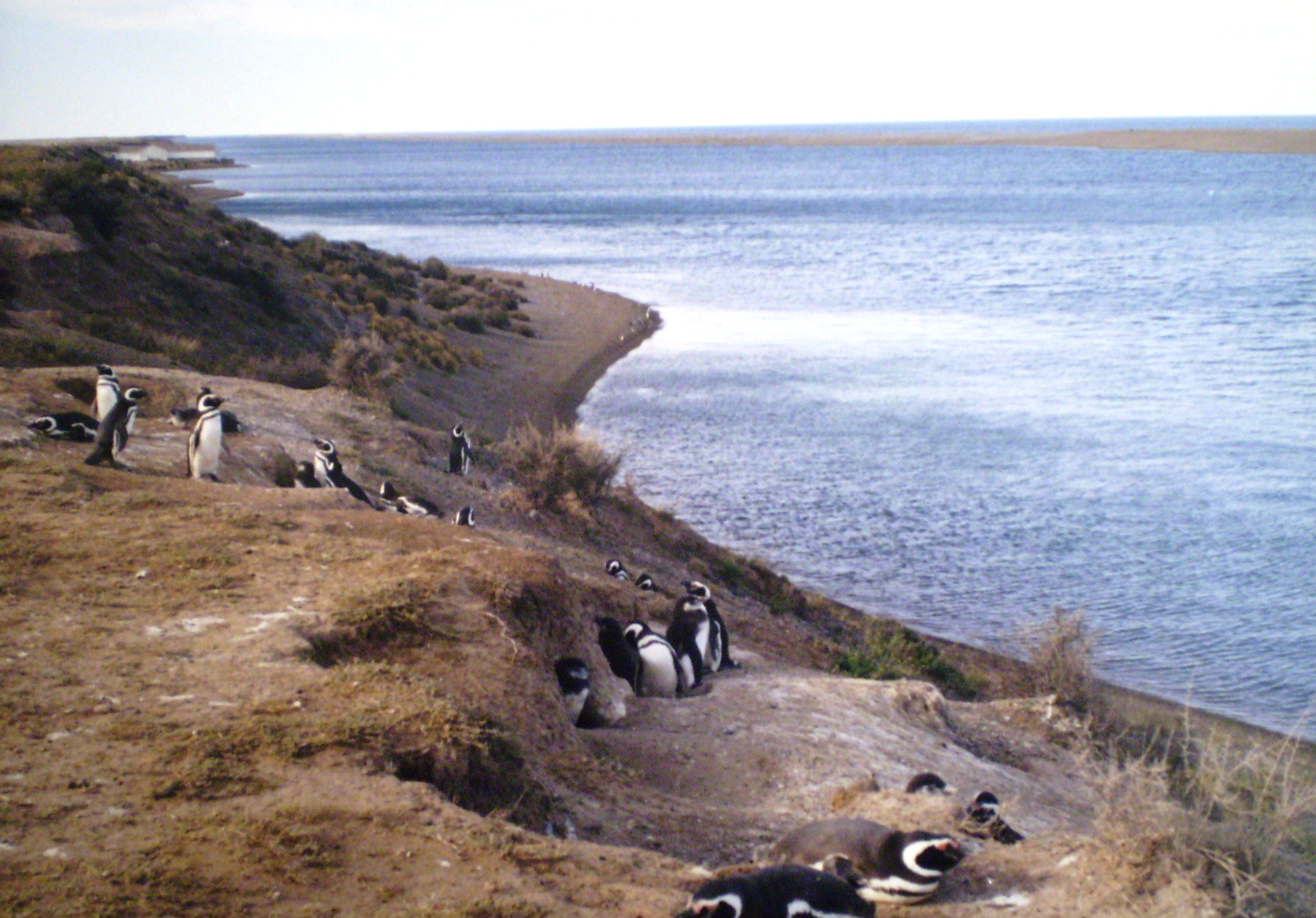
- Penguins on coast of Valdes Peninsula

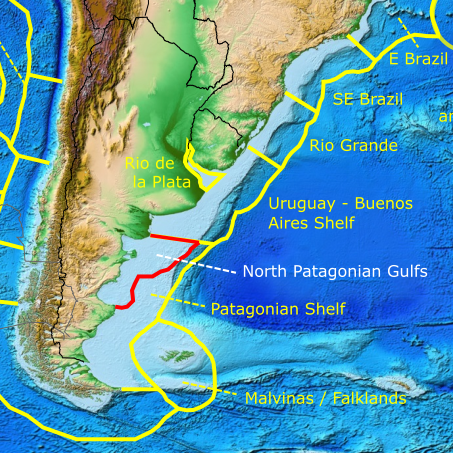
- Marine ecoregion boundaries (red line)

Ecology
- Realm: Temperate South America
- Province: Magellanic province
- Borders (marine): Uruguay - Buenos Aires Shelf, Patagonian Shelf

Geography
- Area: 208,821 km^{2} (80,626 mi^{2})
- Country: Argentina

The North Patagonian Gulfs marine ecoregion covers the gulfs and continental shelf of the middle Patagonian coast of Argentina. As the name suggests, the coast is indented with large gulfs - San Matías Gulf (north), Golfo Nuevo (middle) and San Jorge Gulf (south). The broad, protected areas and rocky reefs support abundant fisheries. The abundance of rocks, promontories and islands support breeding sites for marine mammals and colonies of seabirds. The area is, however, under pressure from over-harvesting of mollusk and crustacean beds, and from development and tourism. The entire ecoregion is on the Patagonian Shelf. The ecoregion is part of the Magellanic marine province. It is thus part of the Temperate South America realm. .

== Physical setting ==
The northern border of the ecoregion, at 41°S, reaches out for 260 miles into the Atlantic Ocean from the mouth of Río Negro (Argentina). The ecoregion is bounded on the south at 47°S at the southern point of San Jorge Gulf. In between are 1,890 miles of highly indented coastline. The bordering coast is generally low, dry scrub and grassland, characterized by the Argentine Monte ecoregion along the northern coast and Patagonian Desert along the southern. Few rivers feed the ecoregion; exceptions are the Rio Negro in the north and Chubut River in the south.

The entire ecoregion sits on the continental shelf (the Patagonian Shelf). The deepest point in the ecoregion overall is −216 metres (−709 ft), and the average is −78 metres (−256 ft).

== Currents and climate ==
The cold, nutrient-rich Malvinas Current (MC) (also called the Falkland Current) is a north-flowing offshoot of the Antarctic Circumpolar Current that flows along the continental slope just offshore of the ecoregion. The cross-shelf flow (perpendicular to the coast) varies in rate in an annual cycle.

Surface water temperatures in the gulfs range from 8 °C in August–September to 18 °C in February–March.

== Animals / Fish ==
Marine productivity is very high in the region. The shallow waters of the shelf provide light and protection, the varied seabed (rocks, gravel, limestone) support a rich benthic community, and the marine fronts provide mixing of nutrients and sea life. In the San Matias Gulf, the most important commercial fisheries are for Argentine hake (Merluccius hubbsi) and the Choicy ruff (Seriolella porosa).

== Conservation ==
The ecoregion includes the waters around Valdés Peninsula, a World Heritage site famous breeding sites for sea lions, elephant seals and fur seals. The area also supports the most important breeding ground for Southern right whales in the world.
