= La Brava Lake =

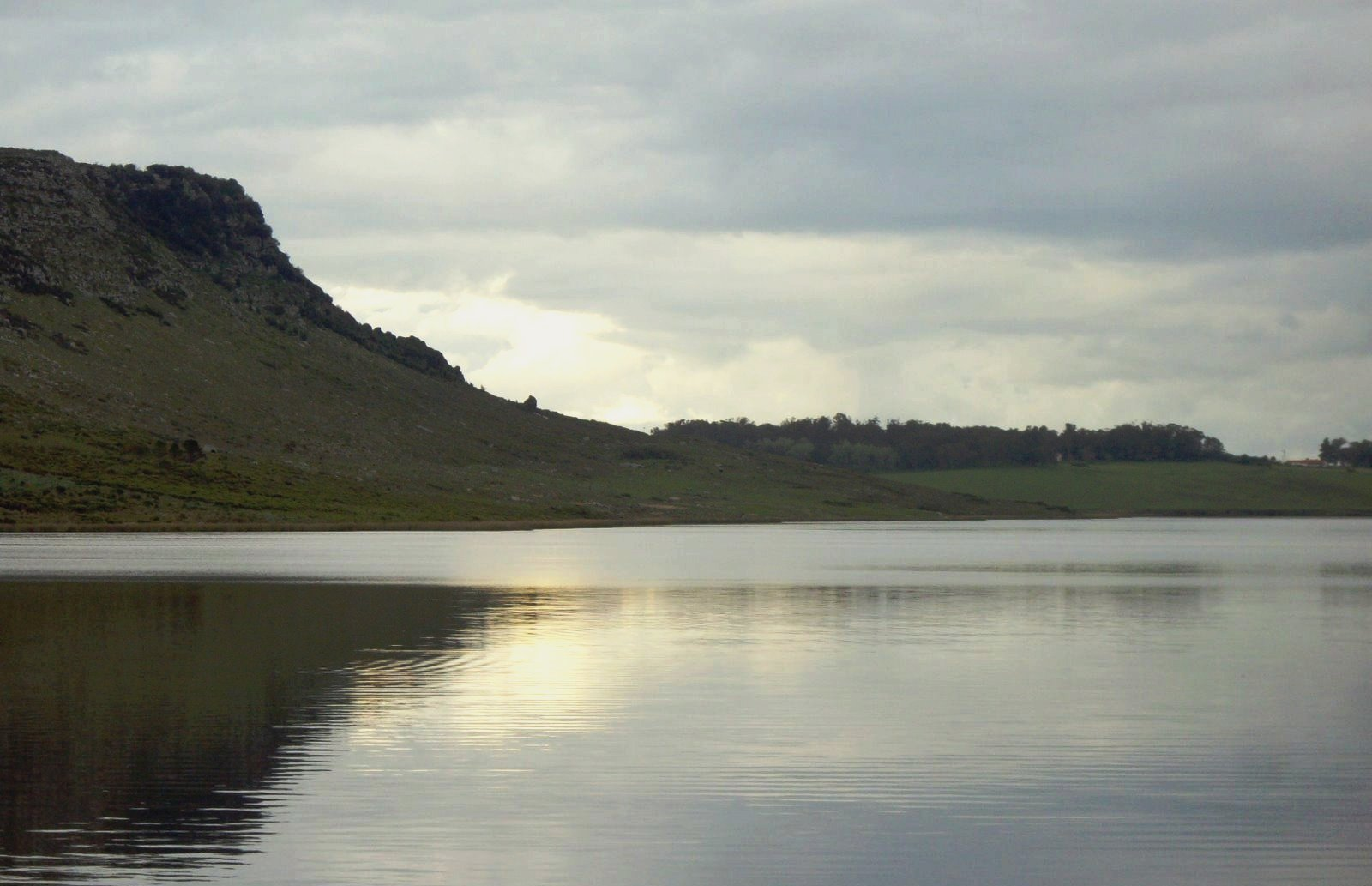
- La Brava at sunset

- Location within Argentina
- Location: Balcarce Partido; Province of Buenos Aires; Argentina
- Coordinates: 37°52′52.10″S 57°58′38.30″W
- Type: Rift lake
- Primary inflows: Tajamar stream
- Primary outflows: Tajamar stream
- Basin countries: Argentina
- Max. length: 3.50 km (2.17 mi)
- Max. width: 1.2 km (0.75 mi)
- Surface area: 500 ha (1,200 acres)
- Average depth: 4 m (13 ft)
- Max. depth: 8 m (26 ft)
- Shore length^{1}: 9.6 km (6.0 mi)
- Surface elevation: 100 m (330 ft)
- ^{1} Shore length is not a well-defined measure.

La Brava is a lake in the eastearn part of the Balcarce Partido in Buenos Aires Province, Argentina. It lies just on the border with General Pueyrredón, 40 kilometres (25 mi) northwest of the city of Mar del Plata and 25 kilometres (16 mi) east of the town of Balcarce. Located within Mount La Brava, the lake area is privately owned, although open to the public for fishing and camping. There are several campsites around the lake, like Ruca Lauquen on the east coast and the Fishing Club Balcarce on the north, both of them with recreational facilities and boat piers. The lake is described as a rift lake or tectonic lake, probably a natural reservoir formed by dunes. La Brava is the habitat of a number of bird species, like swans, ducks, coots, herons and gulls. Capybaras and otters dwell in its shores. The lake also supports a fish community dominated by the silverside and the dentudo. The landscape has been compared with that of the lakes of western Patagonia.

== See also ==
- Laguna de los Padres
- Sierra de los Padres
