= Rio Grande marine ecoregion =

Tropical marine ecoregion

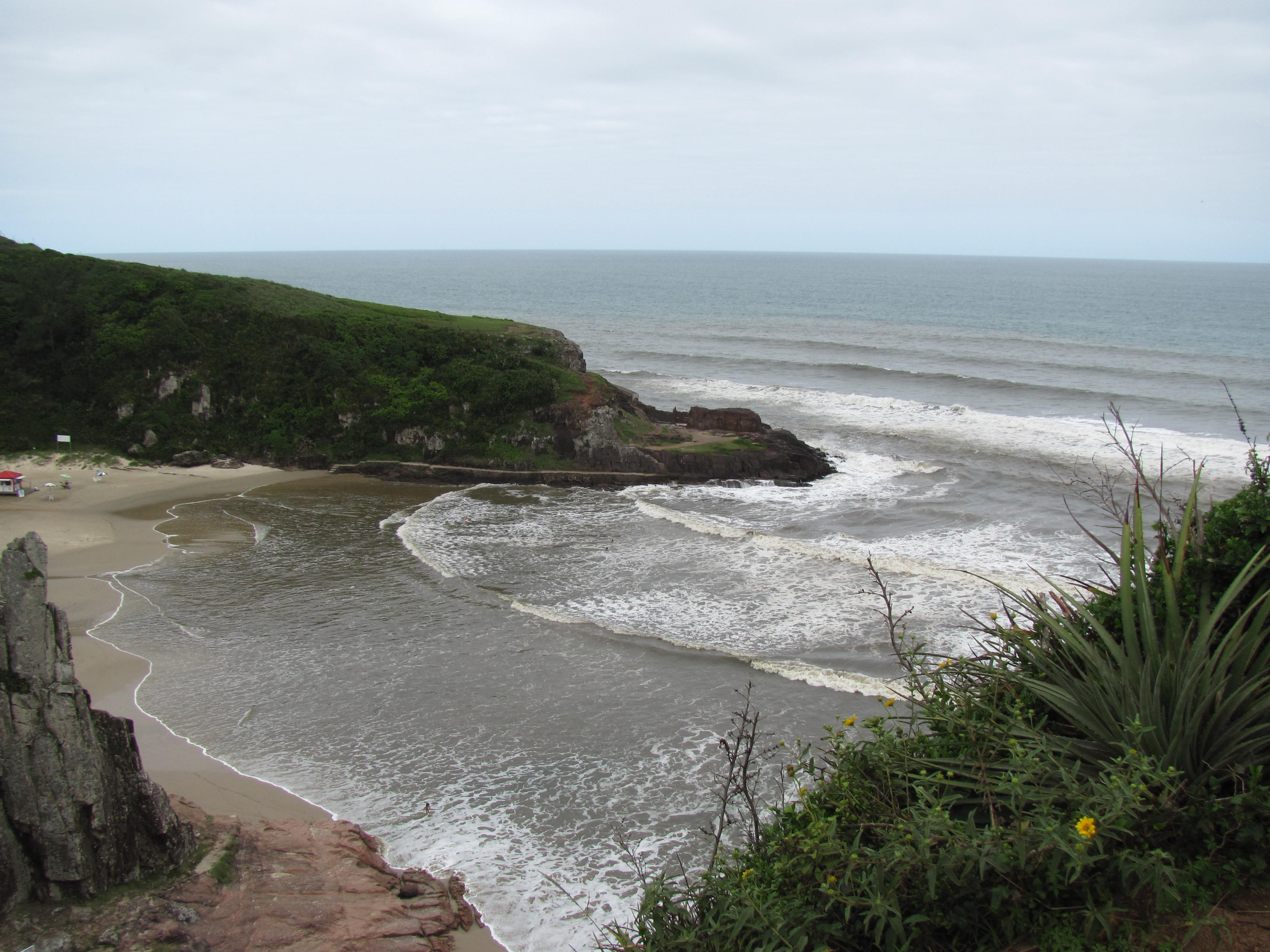
- Parque da Guarita, Torres, Brazil

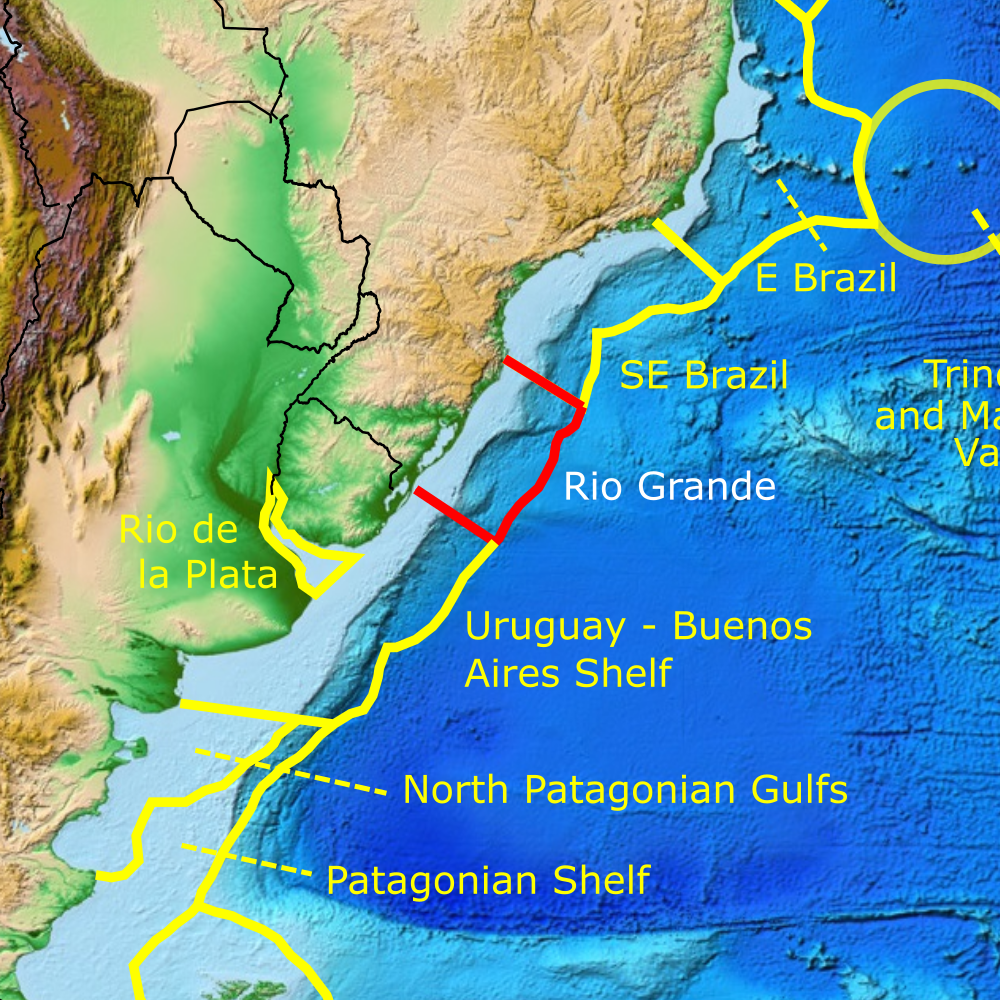
- Marine ecoregion boundaries (red line)

Ecology
- Realm: Temperate South America
- Province: Warm Temperate Southwestern Atlantic
- Borders (marine): Southeastern Brazil marine ecoregion, Uruguay - Buenos Aires Shelf marine ecoregion

Geography
- Country: Brazil

The Rio Grande marine ecoregion covers the waters offshore of the southern Brazilian states of Rio Grande do Sul and Santa Catarina. It is part of the Temperate South America region. The warm Brazil Current flows south through the region in parallel with the coast.

Overfishing is a problem, but marine life in recent years has benefited from measures such as a 2018 ban on motorized shrimp trawler fishing within 12 miles of the Rio Grande do Sul coast.

== Physical setting ==
The ecoregion covers the waters offshore of the southern Brazilian states of Rio Grande do Sul and Santa Catarina. It stretches along 800 kilometres (500 mi) of sandy beach coast, and 320 km (200 mi) out to sea. It is one of four coastal marine ecoregions in the Warm Temperate Southwestern Atlantic marine province. It is thus part of the Temperate South America region.

The ecoregion is bounded on the north at Florianópolis (latitude 28°S), and on the south at the border with Uruguay (latitude 34°S), where the ecoregion transitions to the Uruguay - Buenos Aires Shelf marine ecoregion. Together the two ecoregions make up the South Brazil Shelf, a large marine ecosystem. The bordering coast is generally low-lying coastal scrub and sand in a long barrier island fronting a chain of lakes and lagoons. The terrestrial ecoregion onshore is the Uruguayan savanna ecoregion. There are no major rivers feeding directly into the ocean in the ecoregion.

A significant feature of the ecoregion is the inclusion of an inland lagoon – Lagoa dos Patos, the largest coastal lagoon in South America. The lagoon is 240 km (150 mi) long and is separated from the ocean by a 8–16 km (5–10 mi) wide sand bar; it is open to the sea at an opening at the city of Rio Grande, Rio Grande do Sul. Just south of Lagoa dos Patos is Lagoon Mirim, which is cut off from the sea.

The continental shelf along this coast of Brazil extends an average of 200 km out to sea before dropping off. The deepest point in the ecoregion overall is −1,054 metres (−3,458 ft), and the average is −84 m (−276 ft). The continental shelf is smooth and flat, with the bottom mostly sand and mud.

== Currents and climate ==
The Brazil Current (BC) flows south through the ecoregion, parallel to the coast. The BC flows at a transport rate averaging 11 Sverdrups (Sv) as it enters the region in the north, building to 22 Sv as the current leaves the region in the south. It moves at a mean speed of 60–100 centimetres per second (1.3–2.2 mph). Surface temperatures range from 18–28 °C (64–82 °F), but vary by 5-13 18–28 °C (64–82 °F), with warmer temperatures in August and further inshore. The BC is a western boundary current, the southern hemisphere counterpart of the Gulf Stream, but shallower and weaker. There is some evidence that the BC may be shifting slightly southward due to the influence of surface warming hotspots.

== Fauna ==
The marine life of the region is influenced by the convergence of the south-flowing Brazil Current and the north-flowing Malvinas Current south of the ecoregion. The nutrients of the currents plus continental runoff support high biological production in the lagoons and on the continental shelf. Commercial fisheries exist for shrimp, weakfish, mullet, sardines, anchovies, and, offshore, shark and tuna. The lagoon complexes support pink shrimp (Farfantepenaeus paulensis) and southern white shrimp (Litopenaeus schmitti).

One study in the 1990s found that 80% of the biomass on the shelf were teleost (ray-finned) fish species of the family (Sciaenidae) (drums and croaker). Many of the fish are seasonal, coming from the colder, more nutrient-rich waters to the south. The commercially important seasonal fish include the striped (Argentine) croaker (Umbrina canosai), weakfish (Cynoscion guatucupa), croaker (Micropogonias furnieri), red porgy (Pagrus pagrus), and school shark (Galeorhinus galeus). These migrant fish account for 70% of the catch in the ecoregion.

Because the bottom in the region features flat, smooth, and shallow waters, it is in important breeding ground for species such as rays and sharks. But the high levels of shrimp trawling, which uses tight nets, led to destructive levels of bycatch and disturbance of the sand and mud bottom. In 2018, overfishing led to a ban on trawler fishing out to 12 miles from the coast of the state of Rio Grande do Sul. The result has been a comeback for depleted species.

== Conservation status ==
Only about 0.4% of the ecoregion is in an officially protected area, including:

- Área de Proteção Ambiental da Baleia Franca, in Santa Catarina state.
- Reserva Particular Do Patrimônio Natural Estadual Barba
