= Southeastern Brazil marine ecoregion =

Tropical marine ecoregion

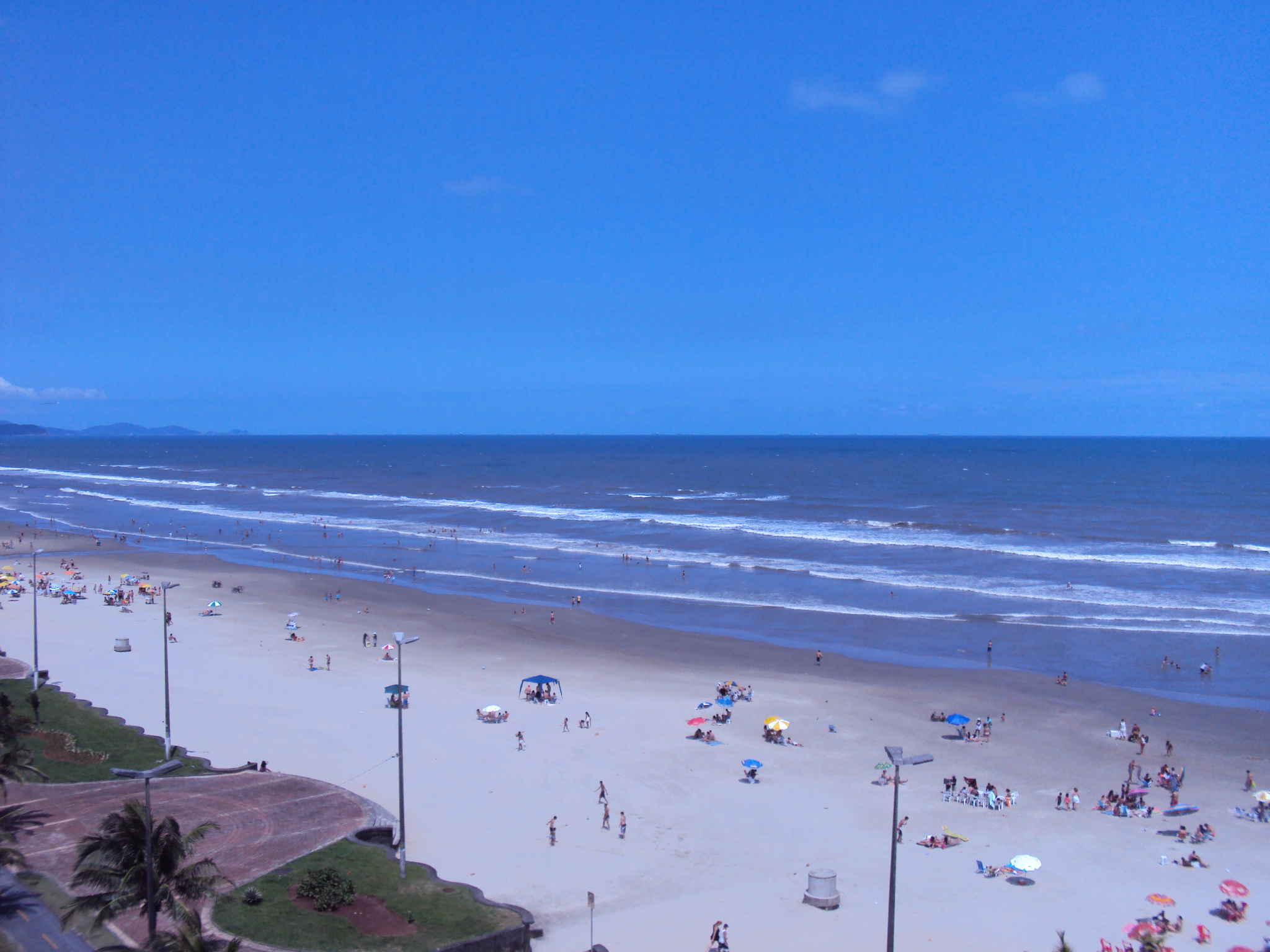
- Beach at Praia Grande, at the north of the marine ecoregion

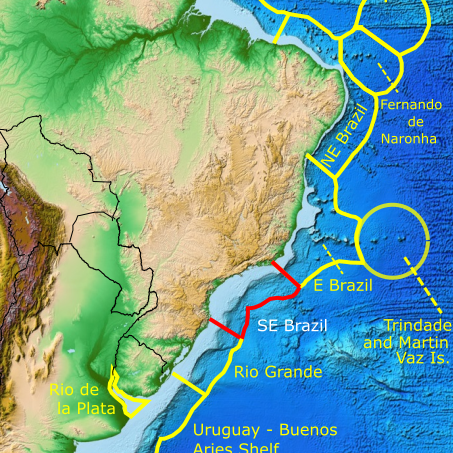
- Marine ecoregion boundaries (red line)

Ecology
- Realm: Temperate South America
- Province: Warm Temperate Southwestern Atlantic

Geography
- Country: Brazil

The Southeastern Brazil marine ecoregion covers the warm coastal waters to 250 miles offshore of southeastern Brazil, from the latitude of Rio de Janeiro in the north to Florianópolis in the south. Marine diversity is supported by local upwellings in the north and the inflow of the Brazil Current. The region is one of transition from a tropical to a warm temperate environment. The marine ecoregion is one of four coastal marine ecoregions in the Warm Temperate Southwestern Atlantic marine province. It is thus part of the Temperate South America realm. .

== Physical setting ==
The ecoregion reaches out into the Atlantic Ocean for 250 miles from the coast. The ecoregion is bounded on the north at Cabo Frio (23 degrees south latitude), and stretches for 850 coastal kilometers to the south at Florianopolis (about 28 degrees south latitude), where the ecoregion transitions to the Rio Grande marine ecoregion. The bordering coast features beaches that are generally fronting coastal scrub, mangroves, and Restinga, a type of sandy, nutrient-poor coastal forest.

Unlike the coast further to the north, the coast in this region has elongated lagoons in graben (trench-like) geologic formations that run in parallel to the coast. One stretch of interconnected estuaries and lagoons on the coast is the Iguape-Cananéia-Paranaguá estuary lagoon complex, an ecologically important contributor to the marine life of the marine ecoregion. The terrestrial ecoregion of the interior along the coast is the Serra do Mar coastal forests ecoregion. There are few major rivers feeding the marine region; but smaller ones include the Guando River, Ribeira de Iguape River and the Itajaí-Açu river.

Along the coast are a series of islands that contribute to the marine diversity of their surroundings, including Ilha Grande (a UNESCO World Heritage Site, Restinga da Marambaia, the mountainous Ilhabela archipelago, and Santa Catarina Island at Florianopolis in the south of the region.

The continental shelf along this coast of Brazil extends to about 150 miles offshore; the bottom is mostly sand and mud. The deepest point in the ecoregion overall is −726 metres (−2,382 ft), and the average is −91.2 metres (−299 ft).

== Currents and climate ==
The Brazil Current (BC) flows directly into the ecoregion from the North, bringing warm water from the South Equatorial Current of the South Atlantic Ocean. The Brazil Current is a western boundary current that extends to a depth of about 600 meters. It flows southwest along the coast at a rate over 6.5 Sverdrups (Sv) in the north and with increasing flow as it moves south. The mean speed of the Brazil Current is 60–100 centimetres per second (1.3–2.2 mph), and surface temperatures range from 18–28 °C (64–82 °F).

== Animals / Fish ==
The near-shore marine life reflects the support of the lagoons, estuaries and mangroves that are common in this region. Also, the levels of industrial and domestic pollution vary according to the human activity of the nearest bay or estuary. Artisanal fishing practices are employed in the coastal fisheries: trawling for shrimp, manual collection of shellfish and crab, seine fishing for bluefish, mullet and bonitos. The broadband anchovy (Anchoviella lepindentostole) is an important traditional fishery along São Paulo State, although unsustainable fishing practices are threatening it and other stocks like the Grey triggerfish (Balistes capriscus).

Off-shore, marine diversity is increased by seasonal upwelling of nutrient-rich, cold subtropical waters from cyclonic activity of the Brazil Current. The off-shore fisheries center on trawling for shrimp, and purse seine fishing for the highly depleted sardines.

== Conservation status ==
Conservation threats to the ecoregion are mainly due the large urban areas along the coast (Rio de Janeiro, São Paulo), and associated industrial pollution. Many of the terrestrial protected areas on the coast have marine components, such that about 9% of the ecoregion is protected, including:

- Ilha Anchieta State Park, a terrestrial and marine park centered on the offshore Ilha Anchieta. Species of conservation concern in the park include the vulnerable Atlantic goliath grouper, Southern right whale, and Bryde's whale.
- Guaraqueçaba Environmental Protection Area, an area of varied lagoons, estuaries, and relatively low human population.
