= Amazonia marine ecoregion =

Tropical marine ecoregion

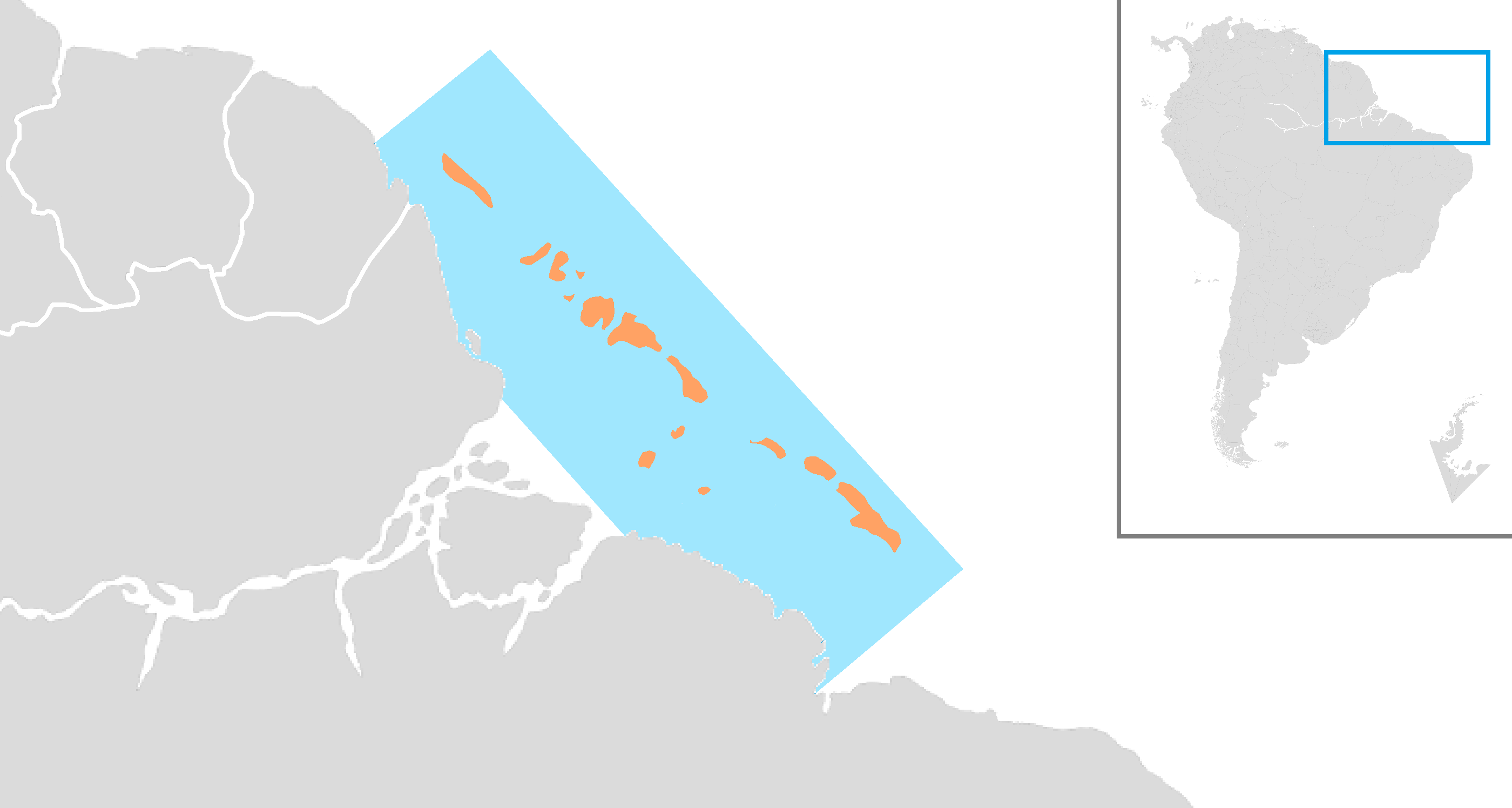
- The Amazon Reef, discovered only in 2012, extends across the ecoregion.
- Interactive map of Amazonia marine ecoregion
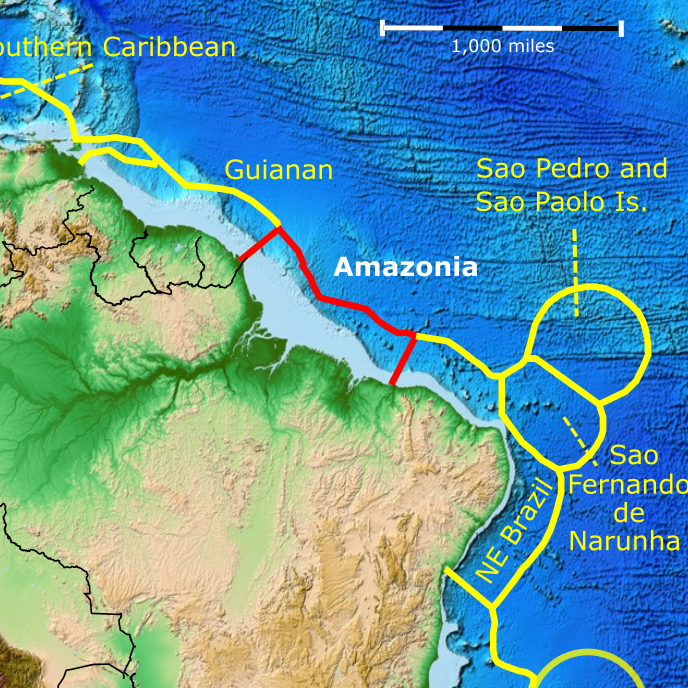
- Marine ecoregion boundaries (red line)
- Location: Brazil
- Coordinates: 0.2°N 48°W
- Type: marine ecoregion
- Part of: Tropical Atlantic realm, North Brazil Shelf province
- Surface area: 384,566 square kilometres (148,482 mi^{2})

The Amazonia marine ecoregion covers the coastal marine environment off the mouth of the Amazon River on the continental shelf of Brazil. The warm North Brazil Current moves east-to-west across the river's outlet, carrying turbid, fresh water to the northwest towards the Caribbean Sea. The Amazonia is one of two ecoregions (the other being the Guianan marine ecoregion) in the North Brazil Shelf province, a large marine ecosystem (LME). It is thus part of the Tropical Atlantic realm.

== Physical setting ==
The ecoregion is bounded on the west at the Brazil-French Guiana border, where the North Brazil Current splits - part continuing northwest as the Guiana Current, part turning north. 850 miles to the southeast, the ecoregion transitions to the Northeastern Brazil marine ecoregion at the mouth of the Parnaiba River. The Amazonia ecoregion extends 200 miles offshore from the coast, covering the shelf and slope of the continental shelf. The bordering coast is low and flat, and characterized by mangrove forests of the Amapá mangroves terrestrial ecoregion, the sandy forests of the Northeastern Brazil restingas, and the Marajó várzea (floodplain forest) of the Amazon delta. Aside from the Amazon, the major rivers feeding the Amazonia marine region include the clearwater Tocantins River and the Mearim River.

The continental shelf is relatively smooth and shallow, with a drop on the shelf about half-way to the north. The deepest point is −2,047 metres (−6,716 ft), and the average is −49 metres (−161 ft). 38% of the ecoregion is less than 200 meters in depth, and 54% is greater than 1,000 meters. Underneath the freshwater outflow of the Amazon is a carbonate reef structure, the Amazon Reef. This deep reef is colonized by sponges and other filter feeders, under conditions of low light and dense particulates.

== Currents and climate ==
Flowing northwest through the ecoregion is the warm North Brazil Current (NBC), the northern continuation of the Central) South Equatorial Current bringing warm water from the South Atlantic Ocean. The NBC is additionally fed by the outflow of the Amazon River, lowering the salinity and raising the turbidity of the water through the Amazonia marine area. In the summer and fall, the NBC generates counter-cycles that flow north into the Equatorial Counter Current (and the North Atlantic); in the spring the NBC continues straight through the Amazonia ecoregion to feed the Gianan Current and eventually the Caribbean Sea. The NBC flows at a rate averaging 26 Sverdrups (Sv), at a mean speed of 60–100 centimetres per second (1.3–2.2 mph) during the winter months, then slacks off somewhat in the summer as the Intertropical Convergence Zone (ITCZ) shifts north. The winds over the surface range from northeasterly to southeasterly.

A large outflow of fresh and brackish water from the Amazon mouth - the Amazon river plume - extends through the middle of the Amazonia ecoregion, being pulled north by the NBC. Combined with rainfall this lowers the salinity of the ecoregion's waters, to levels that average 35-36.75 ppm. Surface temperatures range from 22–29 °C (72–84 °F).

== Animals / Fish ==
The coast is dominated by the Amazon delta and extensive mangrove forests. The inlets, swamps and lagoons provide shelter, food, and breeding habitat for birds, invertebrates and fish. Offshore, the continental shelf supports soft mud-bottom communities. Aside from the Amazon Reef structure, the bottom is mostly sand, mud and gravel in the deeper water.

Near shore, the most important commercial fisheries are for shrimp, primarily Southern brown shrimp (Farfantepenaeus subtilis) and Red spotted shrimp (Farfantepenaeus brasiliensis).

== Conservation status ==
Many of the terrestrial protected areas on the coast have marine components, such that about 12% of the ecoregion is protected, including:

- Cabo Orange National Park. Marine zone extends 10 miles out from extensive wetlands (a RAMSAR site).
- Algodoal-Maiandeua Environmental Protection Area. Two islands at the mouth of the Amazon, with mangroves important for their role as nurseries for fish, mussels, shrimps, oysters, turtles, crabs and other marine life.
