= Temperate South America =

Biogeographic region of the Earth's seas

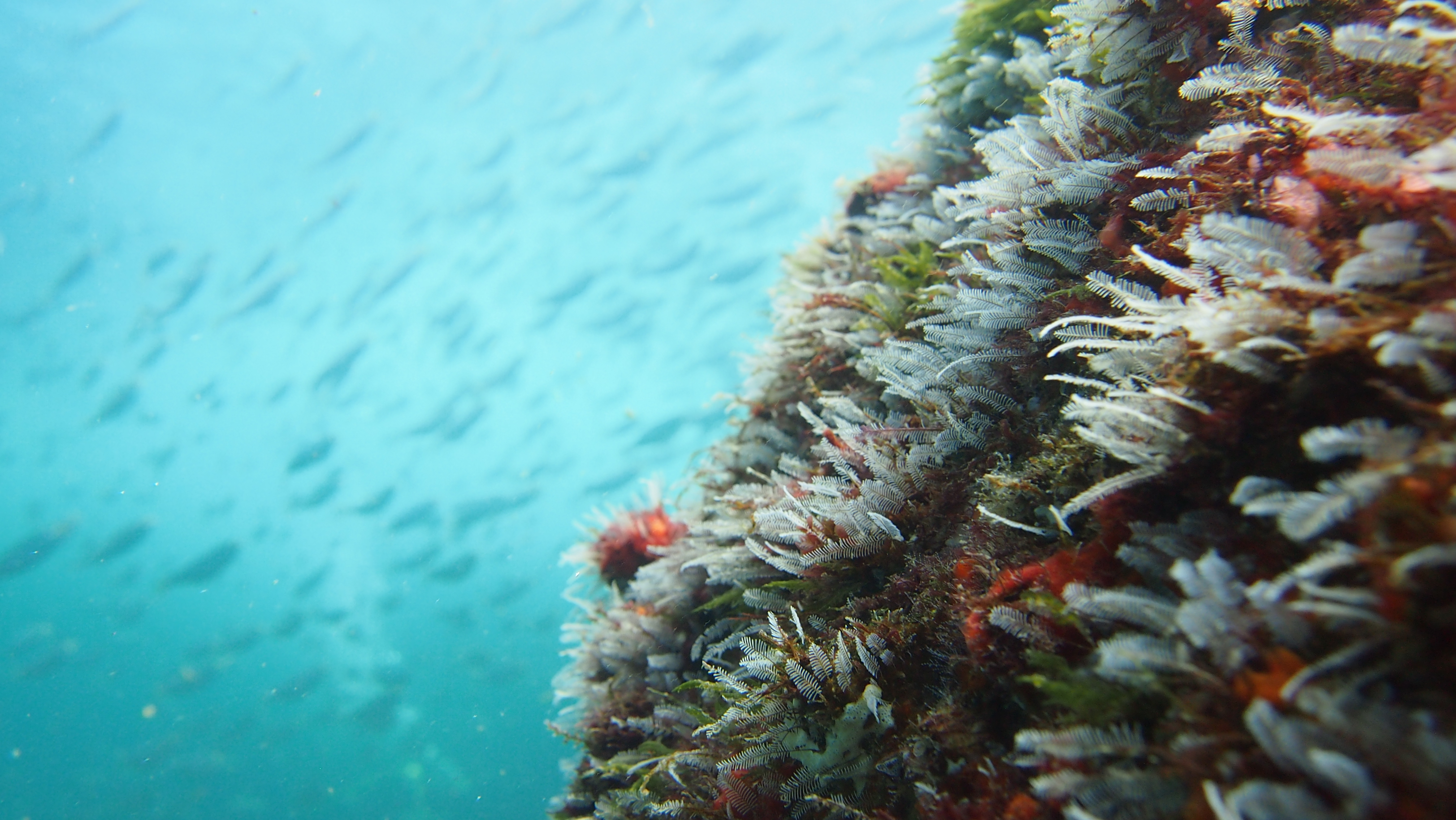
Marine life off the coast of Santa Catarina, Brazil.

Temperate South America is a biogeographic region of the Earth's seas, comprising the temperate and subtropical waters of South America, including both the Pacific and Atlantic coasts of the continent and adjacent islands. It also includes the remote Gough Island and Tristan da Cunha in the South Atlantic Ocean. It is a marine realm, one of the great biogeographic divisions of the world's ocean basins.

On the Atlantic coast, Temperate South America transitions to the Tropical Atlantic marine realm near Rio de Janeiro in Brazil. On the Pacific coast, it extends to Punta Aguja in northern Peru, where it transitions to the Tropical Eastern Pacific realm. To the south lies the Southern Ocean.

The Atlantic coast is influenced by the Brazil Current, which carries warm tropical waters south along the coast. On the Pacific coast, the cold Humboldt Current carries cold Antarctic waters north towards the tropics.

== Subdivisions ==
The Temperate South America realm is divided into five marine provinces. The three larger provinces are composed of smaller ecoregions.

- Warm Temperate Southeastern Pacific
  - Central Peru
  - Humboldtian
  - Central Chile
  - Araucanian
- Juan Fernandez and Desventuradas
  - Juan Fernandez Islands and Desventuradas Islands
- Warm Temperate Southwestern Atlantic
  - Southeastern Brazil
  - Rio Grande
  - Rio de la Plata
  - Uruguay-Buenos Aires Shelf
- Magellanic
  - North Patagonian Gulfs
  - Patagonian Shelf
  - Falkland Islands
  - Channels and Fjords of Southern Chile
  - Chiloense
- Tristan Gough
  - Tristan da Cunha and Gough Island
