= Guianan marine ecoregion =

Tropical marine ecoregion

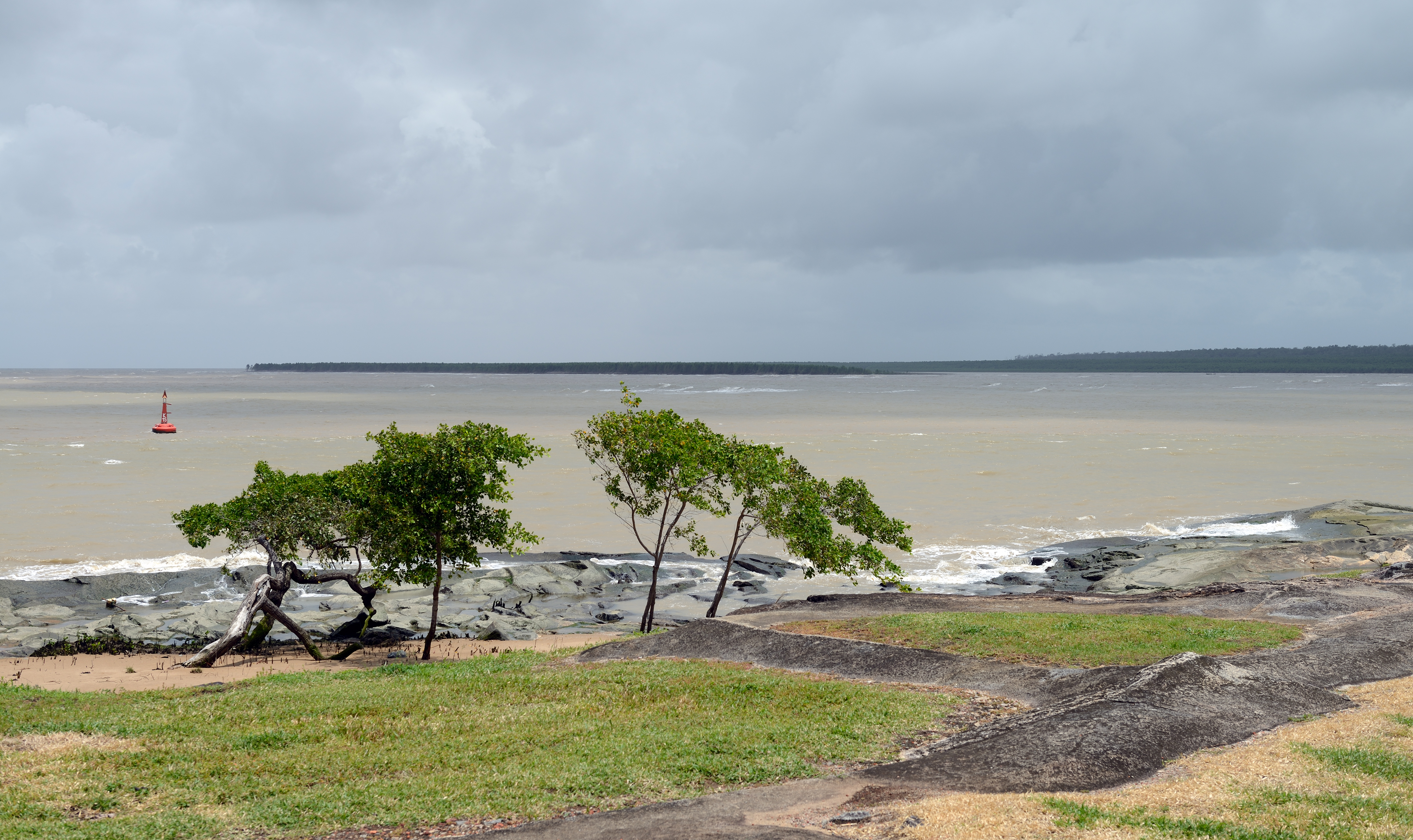
- Kourou River estuary, French Guiana

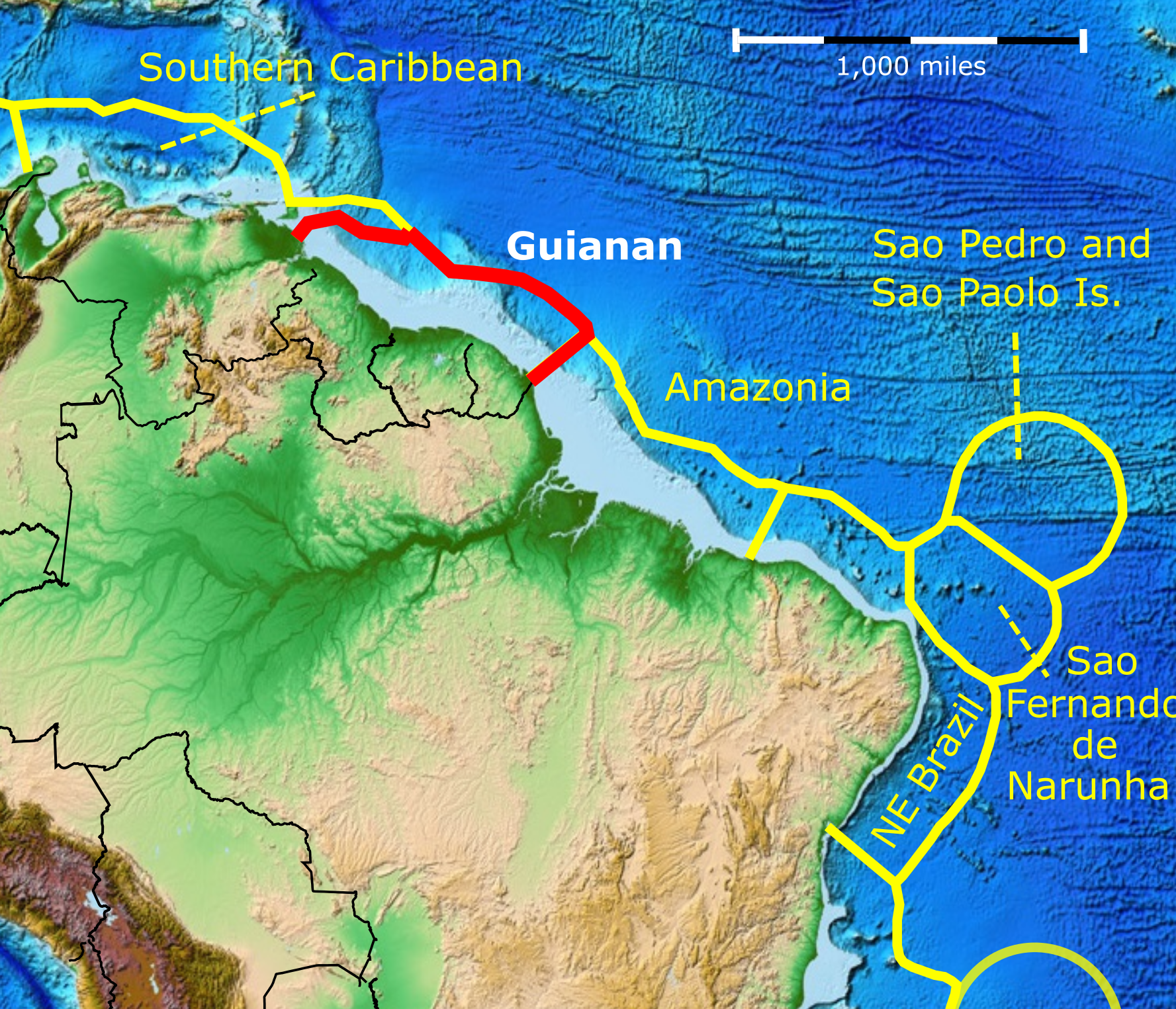
- Marine ecoregion boundaries (red line)

Ecology
- Realm: Tropical Atlantic
- Province: North Brazil Shelf
- Borders (mangrove): Guianan mangroves

Geography
- Area: 384,566 km^{2} (148,482 mi^{2})
- Country: Venezuela, Guyana, Suriname, French Guiana
- Currents: Guianan Current

The Guianan marine ecoregion stretches along the middle of the northeast coast of South America, touching Venezuela, Guyana, Suriname and French Guiana. It extends about 200 miles offshore, with the warm Guianan Current moving east-to-west through the region. This current brings in fresh, turbid waters from the mouth of the Amazon River to the east. As the current exits the ecoregion to the west it contributes an estimated 70% of the waters of the Caribbean Sea. A very large oil field has been recently discovered in the Guyana-Suriname Basin of the ecoregion. The Guianan is one of two ecoregions (the other being the Amazonia marine ecoregion) in the North Brazil Shelf province, a Large marine ecosystem (LME). The Guianan is thus part of the larger Tropical Atlantic realm.

== Physical setting ==
The ecoregion is bounded on the west by entrances to the Caribbean Sea (at Trinidad), and extends 750 miles east to the Brazilian border, where the incoming North Brazil Current splits. The ecoregion extends 200 miles north from the coast, covering the shelf and slope of the continental shelf. The bordering coast is low and flat, and characterized by mangrove forests of the Guianan mangroves terrestrial ecoregion and the Guianan moist forests ecoregion. The major rivers running north into the sea on this coast are (from west to east): the Orinoco River in Venezuela, the Essequibo River in Guyana, the Courantyne River separating Guyana and Suriname, the Maroni River separating Suriname and French Guiana, and at the eastern end the Oyapock River separating the French department of French Guiana from Brazil.

The continental shelf is relatively smooth and shallow, with a drop on the shelf about half-way to the north. The deepest point is −1,127 metres (−3,698 ft), and the average is −61 metres (−200 ft). 38% of the ecoregion is less than 200 meters in depth, and 54% is greater than 1,000 meters. The ecoregions western half is the waters of the Guayana-Suriname Basin, on the northwestern edge of the South American Plate. There is a plateau in the middle (of the Demerara Plateau), and some small rift basins.

== Currents and climate ==
Flowing northwest through the ecoregion is the Guianan Current, a continuation of the warm North Brazil Current (NBC). The NBC itself brings outflow from the Amazon River, lowering the salinity and raising the turbidity of the water through the Guianan marine area. The Guianan Current flows at a rate averaging 10 Sverdrups (Sv), at a mean speed of 41.6 centimetres per second (0.93 mph) during the winter months, then slacks off somewhat in the summer as the Intertropical Convergence Zone (ITCZ) shifts north. Periodically, the Guianan current features "rings" of circulating countercurrents. The winds over the surface range from northeasterly to southeasterly.

Salinity is relatively low, due to the inflow of fresh and brackish water from the Amazon. Salinity levels average 35-36.5 ppm in the Guiana Current, and surface temperatures range from 26–28 °C (79–82 °F).

== Animals / Fish ==
Shrimp fishing is commercially important in the Guianas, particularly for the Atlantic seabob shrimp (Xiphopenaeus kroyeri), a prawn which grows up to 5.5 inches, and the Red-spotted shrimp (Farfantepenaeus brasiliensis). Shrimp are generally fished close inshore at depths of 10-20 meters, large finfish are fished at depths of 20-50 meters. Deep water fisheries in the region include Southern red snapper (Lutjanus purpureus), mackerel, shark, and tuna.

The beaches on the southern margin are important hatching grounds for the vulnerable Leatherback sea turtle, with the region supporting the largest Leatherback nesting area in the world. Other sea turtles nesting in the region are the Green turtle, Hawksbill turtle, and Olive ridley turtle.

The continental shelf supports soft mud-bottom communities with little reef development. The bottom is mostly sand, mud and gravel in the deeper water.

== Conservation status ==
There are no specifically marine protected areas in the ecoregion, but there are terrestrial protected areas with marine components, such that about 2% of the ecoregion is protected, including:

- Galibi Nature Reserve, Suriname. A refuge for Leatherback Turtles
- Wia Wia Nature Reserve, Suriname. A bird sanctuary.
- Coppename Monding Nature Reserve
