= El Marquesado =

- Town
- Location within Buenos Aires Province
- Coordinates: 38°16′S 57°51′W
- Country: Argentina
- Province: Buenos Aires
- Partidos: General Pueyrredón
- Established: November 15, 1977

Population (2001 Census)
  - Total: 200
- Time zone: UTC−3 (ART)
- CPA Base: B 8013
- Climate: Dfc

El Marquesado is a town of the Atlantic Coast located in the General Pueyrredón Partido in the province of Buenos Aires, Argentina.

== Geography ==
El Marquesado is located 40 km (25 mi) from the city of Mar Del Plata, and 450 km (280 mi) from the city of Buenos Aires.

== History ==
El Marquesado was designed as a tourist town for beachgoers in the Mar Del Plata region, as part of a larger growth of the region. The plan for the town was overseen by Osvaldo Alejandro Morales, who owned land nearby. Work on the area was approved in 1975.

The town was officially founded on November 15, 1977, making it one of the first private neighborhoods to be built in Argentina. Among the structures constructed in the town were an amphitheater and a spa, alongside a shopping mall and a 250-car parking lot. Large parts of the coast were blown up to allow for construction. The venture was not successful, in part due to poor economic conditions and mismanagement, and by the 1990s the spa was abandoned and the town was mostly empty. Today, the ruins of the project still remain.

In more recent years, rising sea levels in the region have begun to engulf portions of the community, including the abandoned spa.

In 2025, a large fire destroyed much of the remaining residences around the town.

== Population ==
According to INDEC, which collects population data for the country, the town had a population of 200 people as of the 2001 census.
