= Cangapol =

Indigenous chieftain in today's Argentina

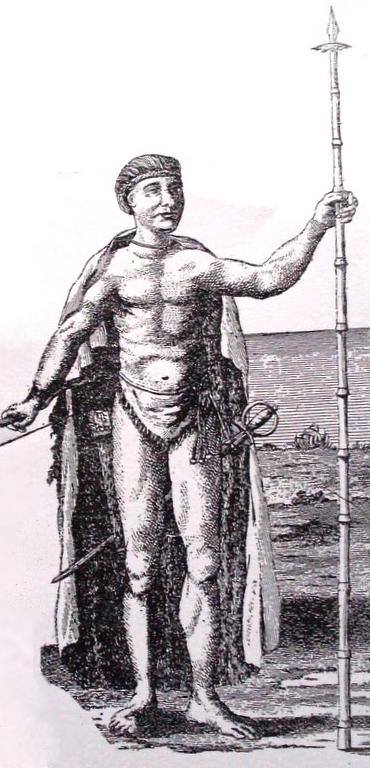
- Chieftain Cangapol in a portrait by Thomas Falkner
- Born: 1670
- Died: 1757 (aged 86–87)
- Occupation: Tehuelche cacique

Cangapol was a Tehuelche cacique from the area of Huilin, in the Negro River Valley in today's Argentina from 1735 to 1757. Born in about 1670, he was the chieftain of the nomadic Leuvuche people, who moved through a huge area from the Negro River to the Vulcan hills, today known as Tandilia hills, between the modern cities of Tandil and Mar del Plata. The Leuvuches were called Serranos (people from the hills) by the Spaniards. In 1751, Cangapol and his warriors expelled the Jesuits from Laguna de los Padres and destroyed the settlement built by them five years before. In 1753, he became an allied of the Spaniards against the Mapuches, who used to take profit of the Leuvuches' plunder raids north of the Salado river and then sought safe haven in Chile, leaving the Leuvuches to face the Spanish retaliation alone. He died in 1757 and was succeeded by his son Nicolás.
