= Laguna de los Padres =

Lake in Argentina

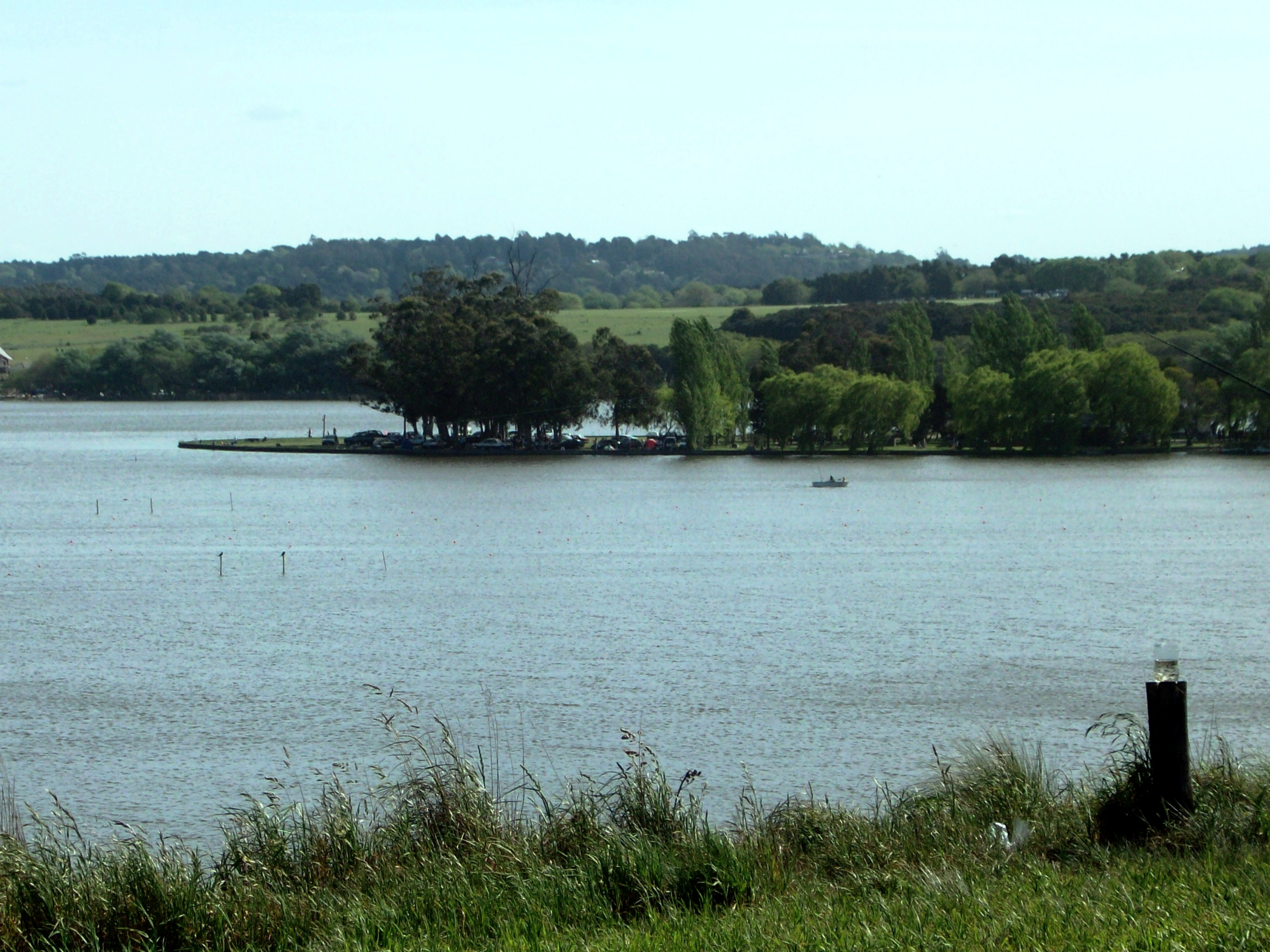
- Laguna de los Padres from the north

- Location within Buenos Aires Province
- Location: General Pueyrredón Partido; Province of Buenos Aires; Argentina
- Coordinates: 37°56′10.2″S 57°44′5.9″W
- Type: Polymictic
- Primary inflows: de los Padres stream
- Primary outflows: La Tapera stream
- Basin countries: Argentina
- Max. length: 2,065 m (6,775 ft)
- Max. width: 1,701 m (5,581 ft)
- Surface area: 380 ha (940 acres)
- Average depth: 2.4 m (7 ft 10 in)
- Max. depth: 5 m (16 ft)
- Shore length^{1}: 8.6 km (5.3 mi)
- Surface elevation: 60 m (200 ft)
- Islands: Fishing club island
- ^{1} Shore length is not a well-defined measure.

Laguna de los Padres is a small lake located about 12 miles west of the city of Mar del Plata, Argentina and roughly one mile east of Sierra de los Padres' hills. The name of the lake as well as of the hills nearby has its origins in the Jesuit Fathers (Padres) attempting to evangelize the region in the 17th century. The lake has a length of 2,065 mt (6,884 feet) and a width of 1,701 mt (5,670 feet). Its water is shallow and the aquatic flora, like algae, rushes and another species like the myriophyllum aquaticum, commonly known in Argentina as gambarussa, overpopulates the muddy bottom. Woods of eucalyptus and pines surround the adjacent area, as well as some aboriginal shrub, like the colletia paradoxa, locally known as curro. The area also hosts the southernmost population of tala and some specimenes of sambucus. The place had been open to the public since 1946. Sport fishing is the main recreational activity, and there is a wharf for row boats in a small island linked to land by a causeway. Watercraft with internal combustion power are not permitted on the lake. Laguna de los Padres also hosted rowing competitions during the 1995 Pan American Games and 2006 South American Games.

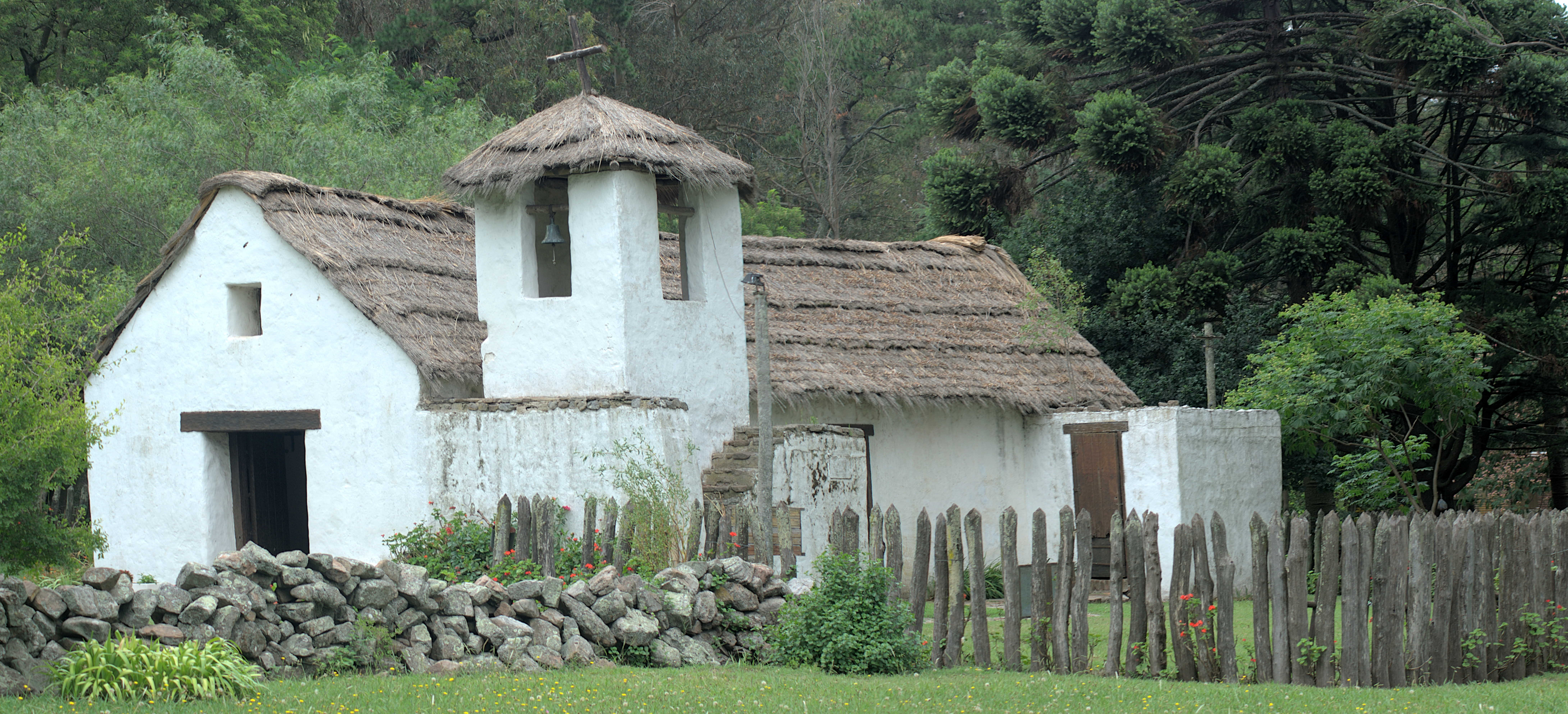
Replica of the 18th Century Jesuit mission's chapel

Near the main entrance there is a reconstruction of the ancient Jesuit mission of Nuestra Señora del Pilar, founded in 1746 and abandoned five years later under pressure from the Leuvuches, a nomadic Tehuelche tribe led by chieftain Cangapol. The lake was known as Laguna de las Cabrillas (lake of the goats) in the Spanish maps of that time. Close to the shore there is an old farmhouse, now a museum, where writer José Hernández, author of the gaucho's national poem Martin Fierro lived briefly during his childhood.

== See also ==
- Sierra de los Padres
- Laguna La Brava
- Thomas Falkner
