= General Pueyrredón Partido =

General Pueyrredón Partido Partido de General Pueyrredón
- Partido
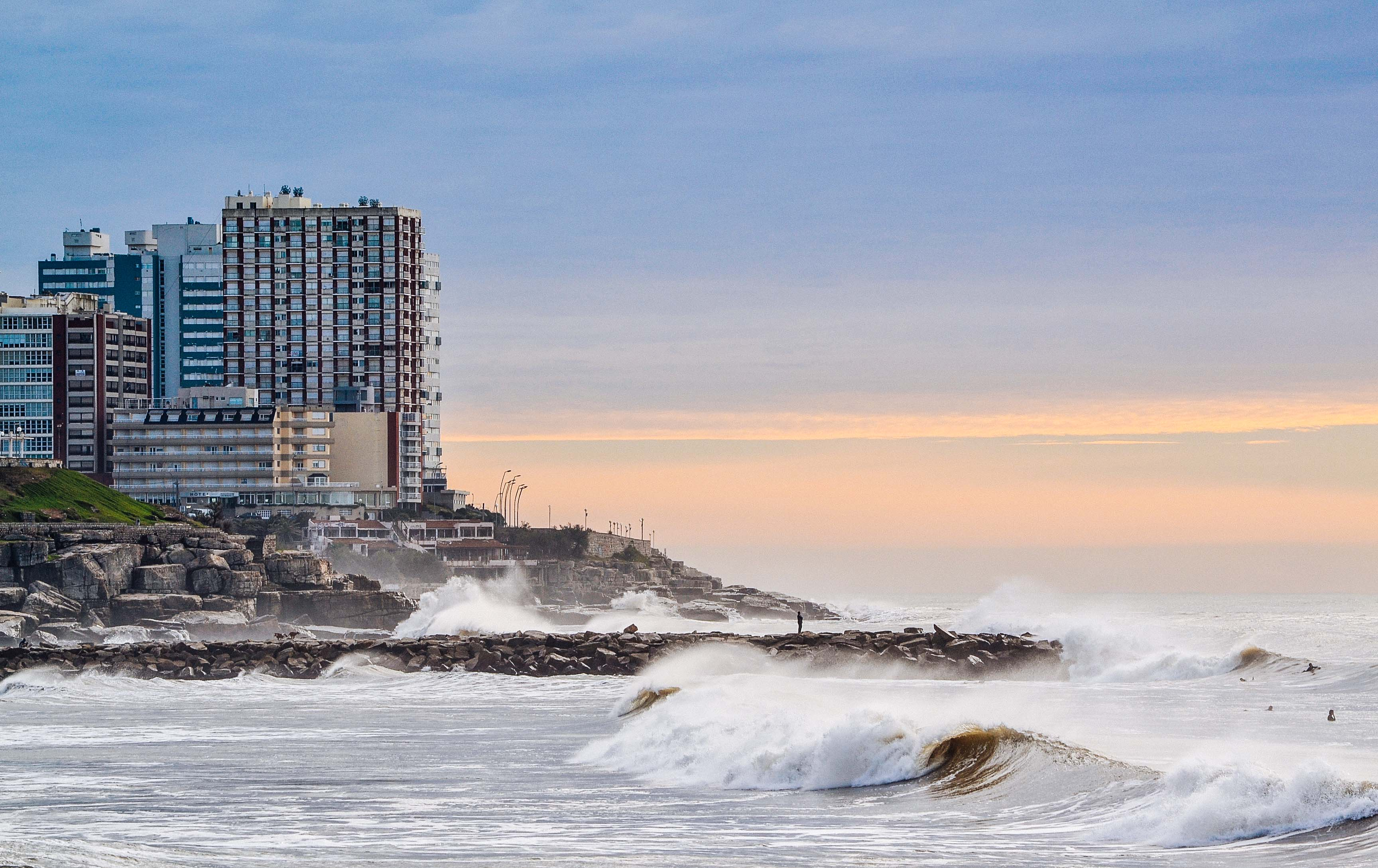
- Skyline of Mar del Plata

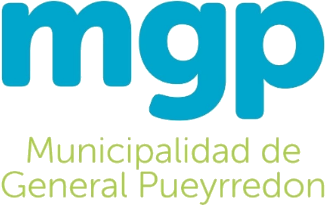
- Seal

- Location in Buenos Aires Province
- Interactive map of General Pueyrredón Partido
- Coordinates: 37°59′S 57°32′W
- Country: Argentina
- Established: February 10, 1874
- Founder: Patricio Peralta Ramos
- Seat: Mar del Plata

Government
  - Intendant: Agustín Neme (PRO-JxC)

Area
  - Total: 1,453.44 km^{2} (561.18 sq mi)

Population
  - Total: 564,056
  - Density: 424/km^{2} (1,100/sq mi)
- Demonym: marplatense
- Postal Code: B7600
- IFAM: BUE053
- Area Code: 0223
- Patron saint: Saint Peter and Saint Cecilia
- Website: mardelplata.gob.ar

General Pueyrredón Partido is a partido located on the Atlantic coast of Buenos Aires Province, Argentina.

The partido covers 1,453 km^{2} and has a population of 564,056 (2001 census [INDEC]), most of whom live in the large coastal resort of Mar del Plata.

The partido was created in 1879. The first mayor was Fortunato de la Plaza.

== Name ==
The partido is named after Juan Martín de Pueyrredón (1776–1850), who fought in the defence of Buenos Aires against the occupation by the Royal Navy in 1806, and fought for his country again in the Argentine War of Independence. He later became a politician, serving as governor of Córdoba Province and as Supreme Director of Argentina.

== Economy ==
The economy of General Pueyrredón Partido is dominated by the summer tourist season (December–February), when hundreds of thousands of vacationers make their way from the Gran Buenos Aires urban area to the Atlantic coast of Argentina. The other major industry is fishing. The main city of General Pueyrredón Partido, Mar del Plata, holds one of the most important fishing ports of Argentina.

Other industries include arable farming, beef and dairy farming, related agricultural industries, metallurgy and the service sector.

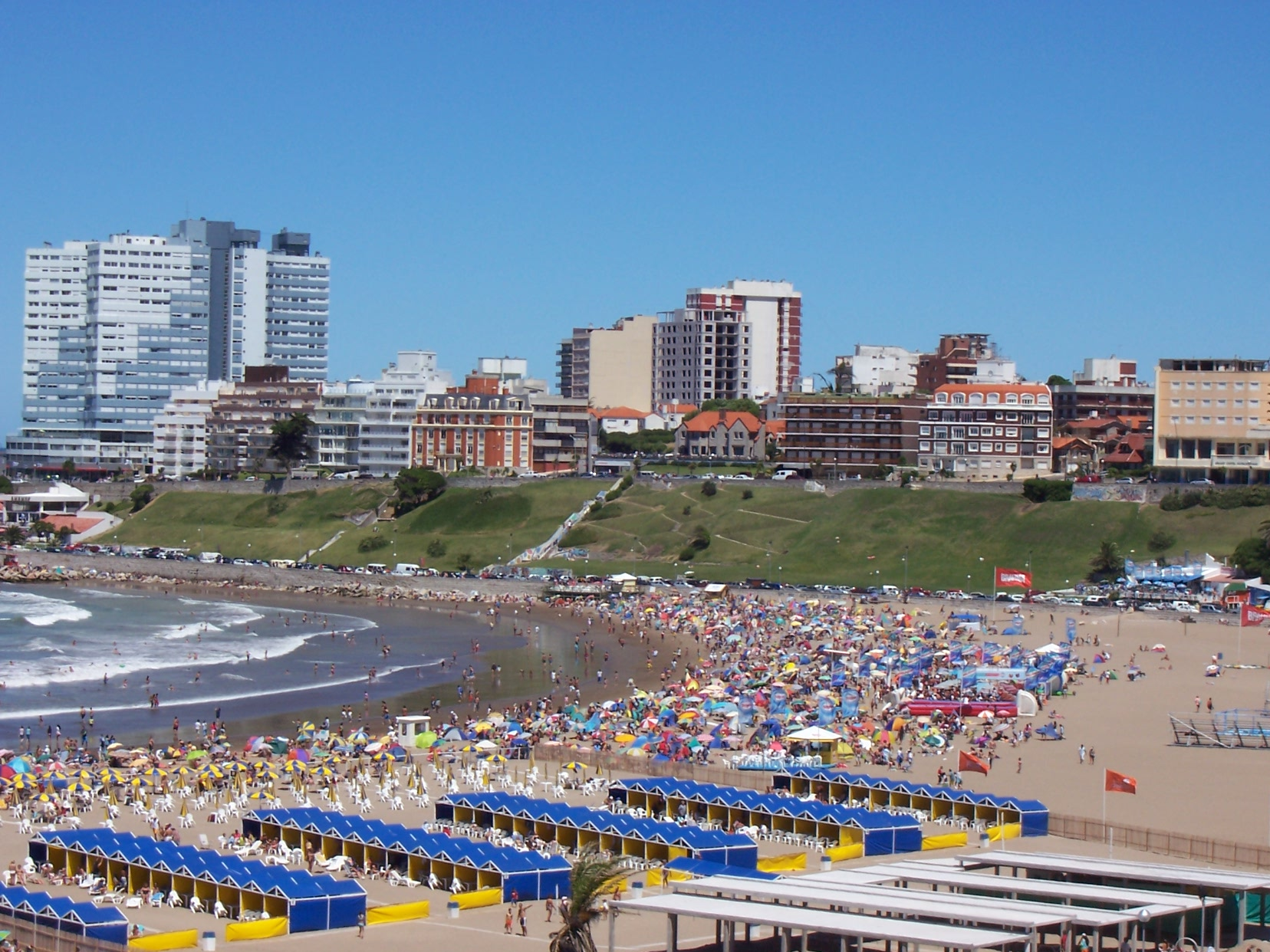
The coastal resort of Mar del Plata

== Districts ==
- Mar del Plata and its resorts and suburbs
- Sierra de los Padres
- Laguna de los Padres
- Chapadmalal
- El Marquesado
- Batán
- El Coyunco
- Gloria de la Peregrina
- Colinas Verdes
- El Dorado
- Santa Paula
- Las Margaritas
- Barrio 2 de Abril
- La Adela
- Santa Angela
- El Sosiego
- Los Zorzales
- Las Quintas
