= Sierra de los Padres =

Coordinates: 37°56′40.79″S 57°46′50.92″W

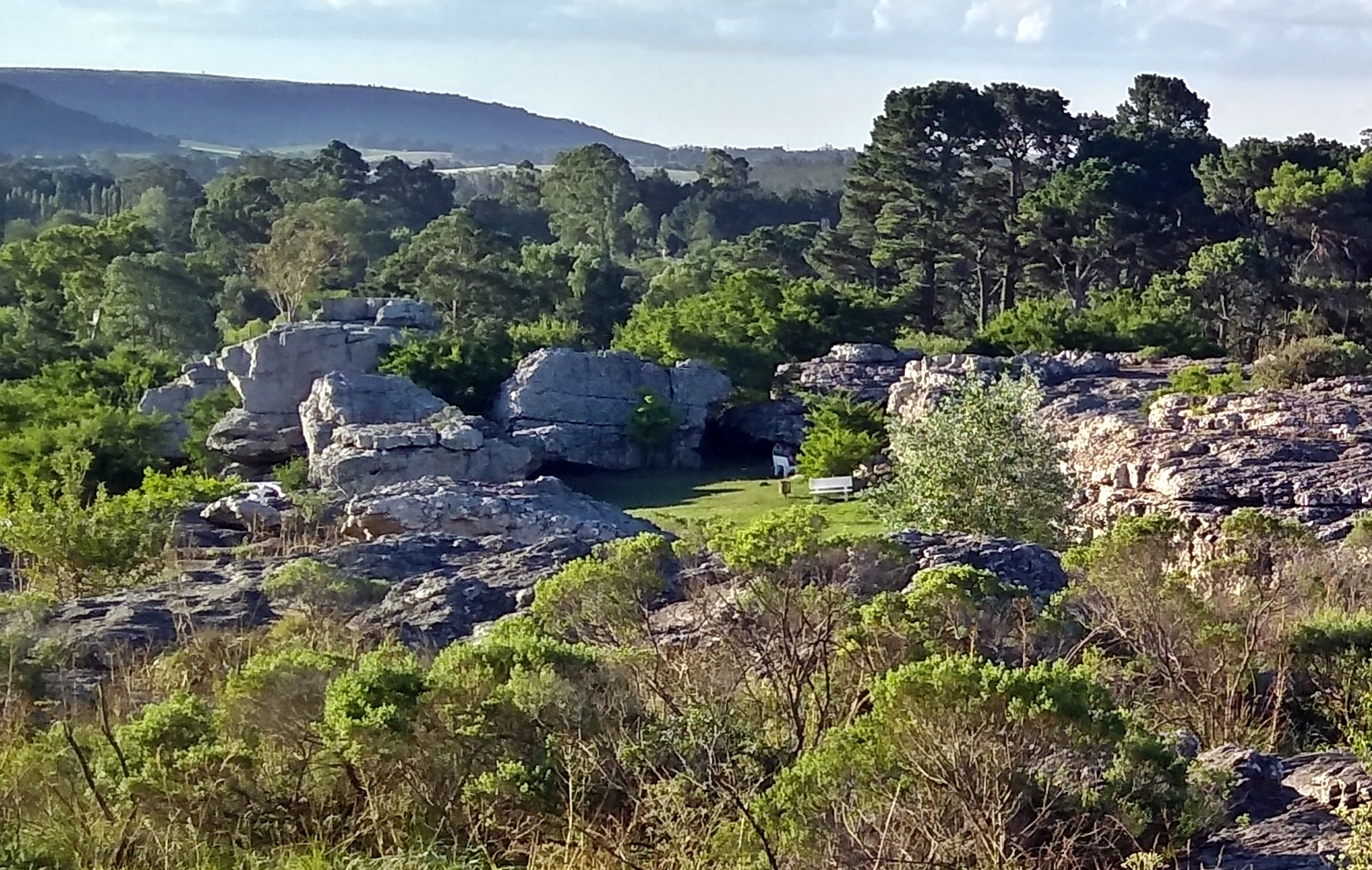
Northwestern slopes of Sierra de los Padres (January 2022)

Sierra de los Padres is a string of rocky hills and ridges about 14 miles west of Mar del Plata. They are part of Tandilia's mountain range, actually a series of low rock-strewn elevations of precambrian origin extended from central Buenos Aires Province to Cabo Corrientes, a cape on the shores of Mar del Plata. These peaks are barely 270 mt (900 feet) high, surrounded by farms in the lower lands and by an exclusive neighborhood built on their slopes. Most local landscapes have panoramic views of the surrounding hills. Recreational activities include trekking, PPC, bouldering and a large Golf link. There is an annual trekking and climbing event organized by the "Club Andino Mar del Plata", with more than 300 climbers attending each October.

The suburban area of Sierra de los Padres was founded on 6 January 1950 by Real Estate entrepreneurs Alfredo Cobos, his brother Francisco Cobos and Roberto Bronzo, who bought lands on the hills to establish a green neighbourhood.

The neighbourhood has four shopping centers and many facilities for visitors. A large super market and many groceries fill local residents' need of food and beverages. The winters are a bit colder than in the coastal area and summers are not so mild. The permanent residents as per the 2010 census were about 4,300. Most of them are members of the upper and upper-middle class. For the children of the village and nearby residents there are one elementary and one middle public schools. Tap water supplies come from a cooperative, the Cooperativa Sierra de Los Padres. The area became a special destination for those seeking meditation and relax.

== See also ==
- Laguna de los Padres
