= Tropical Atlantic =

Marine realm covering both sides of the Atlantic between the temperate realms

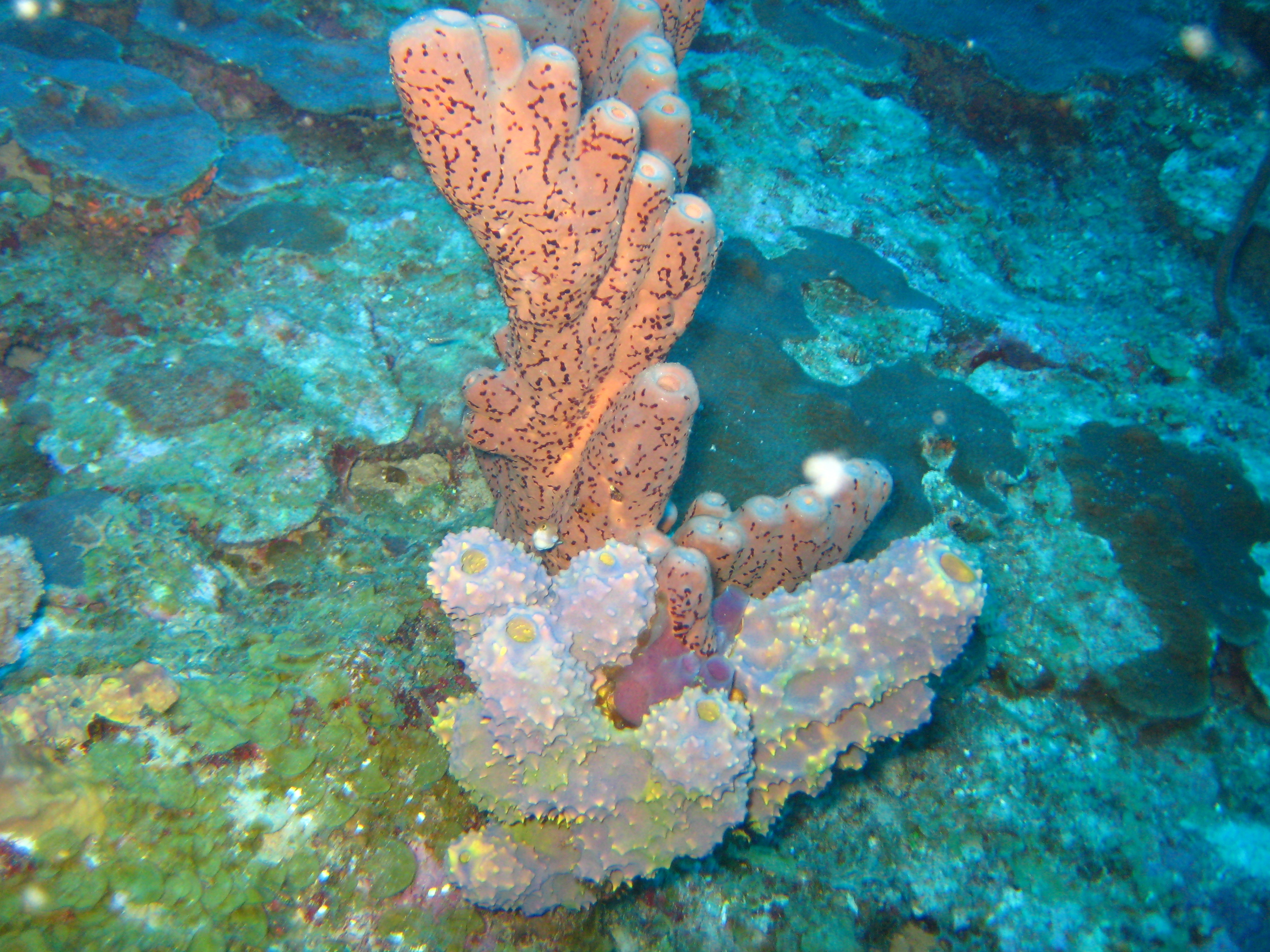
Flower coral off the coast of Humacao, Puerto Rico

The Tropical Atlantic realm is one of twelve marine realms that cover the world's coastal seas and continental shelves.

The Tropical Atlantic covers both sides of the Atlantic. In the western Atlantic, it extends from Bermuda, southern Florida, and the southern Gulf of Mexico through the Caribbean and along South America's Atlantic coast to Cape Frio in Brazil's Rio de Janeiro state. In the Eastern Atlantic, it extends along the African coast from Cape Blanco in Mauritania to the Tigres Peninsula on the coast of Angola. It also includes the seas around St. Helena and Ascension islands.

The Tropical Atlantic is bounded on the north and south by temperate ocean realms. The Temperate Northern Atlantic realm lies to the north on both the North American and African-European shores of the Atlantic. To the south, the ocean realms conform to the continental margins, not the ocean basins; the Temperate South America realm lies to the south along the South American coast, and the Temperate Southern Africa realm lies to the south along the African coast.

== Marine provinces ==
The Tropical Atlantic realm is divided into six marine provinces, which are in turn divided into 25 marine ecoregions.

=== Tropical Northwestern Atlantic ===
- Bermuda
- Bahamian
- Eastern Caribbean
- Greater Antilles
- Southwestern Caribbean
- Western Caribbean
- Southern Gulf of Mexico
- Floridian

=== North Brazil Shelf ===
- Guianian
- Amazonia

=== Tropical Southwestern Atlantic ===
- Sao Pedro and Sao Paulo Islands
- Fernando de Noronha and Atol das Rocas
- Northeastern Brazil
- Eastern Brazil
- Trindade and Martin Vaz Islands

=== Saint Helena, Ascension and Tristan da Cunha Islands ===
- Saint Helena, Ascension and Tristan da Cunha Islands

=== West African Transition ===
- Cape Verde
- Sahelian Upwelling

=== Gulf of Guinea ===
- Gulf of Guinea West
- Gulf of Guinea Upwelling
- Gulf of Guinea Central
- Gulf of Guinea Islands
- Gulf of Guinea South
- Angolan
