= Brazil-Falkland Confluence =

The Brazil–Falkland Confluence Zone (also called the Brazil–Falklands Confluence Zone or the Brazil–Malvinas Confluence Zone) is a very energetic region of water just off the coast of Argentina and Uruguay where the warm poleward flowing Brazil Current and the cold equatorward flowing Falkland Current converge. The region oscillates latitudinally, but in general the region of confluence occurs between 35 and 45 degrees south latitude and 50 to 70 degrees west longitude. The confluence of these two currents causes a strong thermocline to exist and causes numerous high energy eddies to form.

== Brazil Current ==
The Brazil Current is a poleward flowing current that carries warm subtropical water. The Brazil Current branches off northward from the South Equatorial Current at around 10 degrees South. As it flows poleward it branches off into two pieces at around 22 degrees South. One part flows eastward, and the other portion continues the poleward march flowing along the South American continental shelf. The poleward directed branch is the current that comes into convergence with the Falklands Current. Typical temperature values for the Brazil Current are between 18 and 28 degrees Celsius, decreasing as it moves poleward. Typical salinities for the Brazil Current range between 35 and 36psu with some isolated spots as high as 37 psu. The current typically flows in the upper 600 meters of the ocean and its volume transport as it reaches the confluence zone is upwards of 20 Sverdrups with speeds over a half a meter per second.

== Falkland Current ==
The Falkland Current (also called Falklands Current or Malvinas Current) is an equatorward flowing current that carries cold and relatively fresh subantarctic water. The Falkland Current is a branch off of the Antarctic Circumpolar Current. It transports between 60 and 90 Sverdrups of water with speeds ranging from a half a meter to a meter per second. Hydrographic data in this area is very scarce and thus various hydrographic variables have a great deal of error. The Falkland Current is not simply a surface current like the Brazil Current, but extends all the way to the sea floor. Typical temperatures for the current are around 6 °C, with a salinity of 33.5–34.5 psu.

== Water masses in confluence zone ==
There are a total of seven different water masses in the Brazil–Falkland Confluence Zone. These various water masses help contribute even more to this very complex dynamical confluence zone. Starting at the surface (<800m) where the Brazil Current is carrying Subtropical Surface Water and the Falkland Current is carrying Subantarctic Surface Water, after these two surfaces collide they mix some, but in general they develop strong thermohaline fronts due to the strong difference in temperature and salinity. Below the surface from about 800 meters to 1500 meters there is Antarctic Intermediate Water that is flowing equatorward. At the very bottom of the Brazil–Falkland Confluence Zone there is equatorward flowing Weddell Sea Deep Water. Between the Antarctic Intermediate Water and the Weddel Sea Deep Water there are three different water masses flowing poleward: North Atlantic Deep Water, Lower Circumpolar Deep Water, and Upper Circumpolar Deep Water.

== Surface flow and thermohaline gradients in the confluence zone ==
The surface flow in the Brazil–Falkland Confluence Zone is still not quite well understood, but more recently satellites have been able to give us a better idea of what this flow looks like. After the Brazil Current collides with the Falkland Current at around 38 degrees South, it branches off into two different paths. The first path gets redirected back equatorward and actually creates a large anticyclonic eddy with the original Brazil Current. The second path of the Brazil Current, which is much stronger than the aforementioned redirected path, is deflected about 45 degrees east of its original tract poleward.

The surface flow for the Falkland Current after the collision with the Brazil Current is much simpler than that of the Brazil Current. Once the Falkland Current collides with the Brazil Current at the Brazil–Falkland Confluence Zone the Falkland Current gets redirected poleward. It will continue to follow this poleward tract till about 50 degrees South latitude where it will once again be picked back up by the Antarctic Circumpolar Current and head East.

The temperature and salinity gradients that are generated by the Brazil–Falkland Confluence Zone are amazing. The southeast deflected Brazil Current flows just east of the redirected Falkland current at around 57.5W and between 40 and 45S (See fig. 4). In this region sea surface temperature gradients can be as high as 1 degree C per kilometer. Salinity gradients are also extraordinarily high in this region.

The meanders, eddies, and filaments created in this confluence zone are extraordinary. The eddies exhibit strong rotational velocities and are extremely energetic. At any given time there could be 8 or 9 distinct mesoscale eddies with many other microscale eddies existing at the same time. There is a lot of research going into the study of these high energy turbulent mixing areas, but it is still far too early to understand these mesoscale processes in depth.

== The BMC, Local Climate, and Global Climate ==
The presence of both currents, which have a stark contrast in properties, is the characteristic feature of the region. The northward flow of the cold Falkland and the southward flow of the Brazil current has an influence on both local and global climate. They impact local biology because the Falkland is nutrient rich and brings needed nutrients into the basin, causing chlorophyll blooms and supporting plant life that in turn attracts fish to feed on. Therefore, the BMC has an impact on commercial fishing to the point where fishermen track where the collision occurs throughout the year. From a global perspective, the BMC is important because the cold Falkland warms as it encounters the subtropical climate which leads to the outgassing of CO_{2} (warmer water cannot contain as much gas), and the warm Brazil current cools as it encounters the same climate which has the opposite effect - cooler water can contain more gas so the cooling of the Brazil increases the uptake of CO_{2}. The presence of the biology mentioned above also sequesters CO_{2}, allowing more CO_{2} to be taken up by the ocean. The photosynthetic utilization of CO_{2} by the plants, and the regions strong wind speeds leads the region to have increase CO_{2} flux as well. All of this together makes the BMC a large carbon sink for global atmospheric CO_{2}. Some estimates of air-sea CO_{2} flux actually indicate that the BMC is the region of the strongest CO_{2} in the southern hemisphere.

== Current research ==
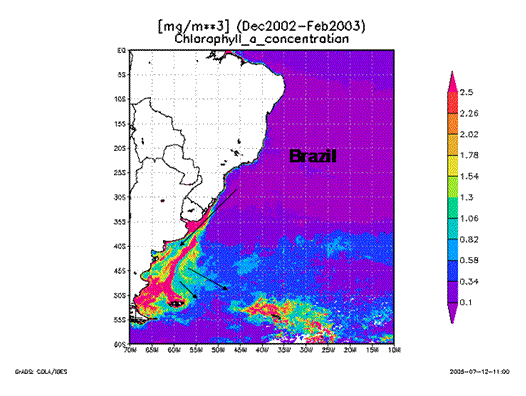
Fig. 5 Chlorophyll-a Concentration in the Brazil–Falkland Confluence Zone

Current research is focusing in on trying to better observe the Brazil–Falkland Confluence Zone so the dynamics of this system can be better explained. Right now there only exists images of these small scale dynamical process (e.g. eddies), however, numerical interpretation of these eddies are still very much in the beginning stages of our understanding. The other major area of research is focusing in on the biological productivity in this region. This confluence zone is such a "hot spot" for primary production because the Falkland Current supplies a lot of nutrients while the Brazil Current supplies warm ocean temperatures. Intense vertical mixing in these zones create a very fertile area for the production of biological species. This zone is looked at as a major atmospheric carbon sink due to the amount of primary production that takes place here which is vitally important in our changing climate. Figure 5 shows chlorophyll-a concentration in this zone.
