= South Equatorial Current =

Ocean current in the Pacific, Atlantic, and Indian Ocean

South Equatorial Current (in black)

The South Equatorial Current are ocean currents in the Pacific, Atlantic, and Indian Ocean that flow east-to-west between the equator and about 20 degrees south. In the Pacific and Atlantic Oceans, it extends across the equator to about 5 degrees north.

Within the southern hemisphere, the South Equatorial Current is the westward limb of the very large-scale subtropical gyres. These gyres are driven by the combination of trade winds in the tropics and westerly winds that are found south of about 30 degrees south, through a rather complicated process that includes western boundary current intensification.

On the equator, the South Equatorial Current is driven directly by the trade winds which blow from east to west.

In the Indian Ocean, the westward-flowing South Equatorial Current is well-developed only south of the equator. Directly on the equator, the winds reverse twice a year due to the monsoons, and so the surface current can be either eastward or westward.

== See also ==
- Brazil–Malvinas Confluence
- Ocean current
- Physical oceanography
