= Patagonian Shelf =

Part of the South American continental shelf

Coordinates: 46°S 63°W

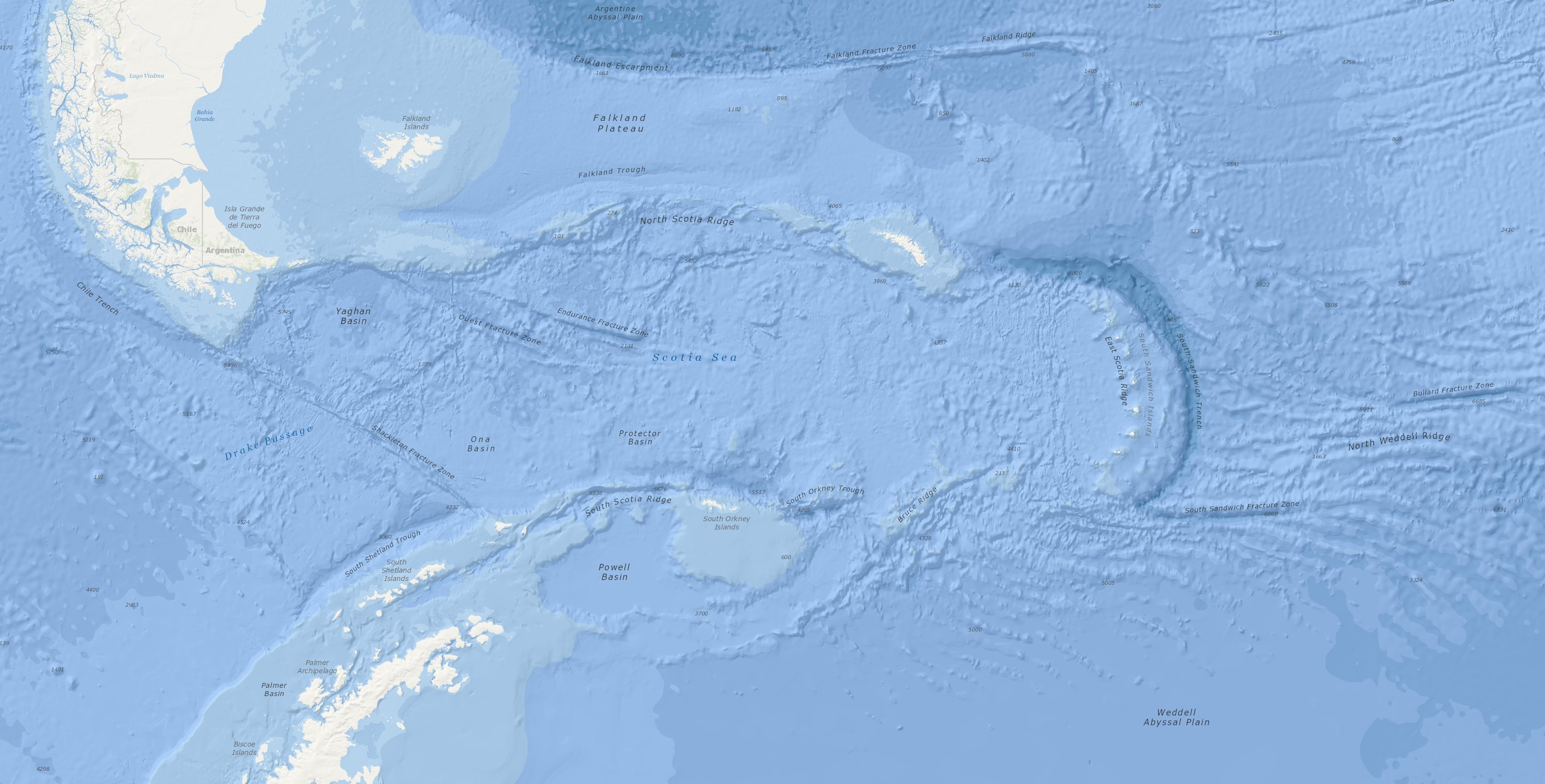
Bathymetry of the Falklands plateau and Scotia Arc

The Patagonian Shelf, sometimes called the Argentine Shelf, is part of the South American continental shelf belonging to the Argentine Sea on the Atlantic seaboard, south of about 35° south. It adjoins the coasts of Argentina and Uruguay, with the Falkland Islands on a raise to the east, before descending down to the Falklands Plateau.

Various authorities quote different dimensions of the shelf, depending on how they define its limits. Quoted statistics cites its area as being from 1.2 to 2.7 million km^{2} (0.46 to 1.04 million sq mi) and its maximum width as being between 760 and 850 km (470 and 530 mi).

The shelf itself can be divided into a 100 km (62 mi) band where the seabed slopes at about 1 m/km then a wide plain (250 to 450 km (160 to 280 mi) wide) where the seabed slopes gently to 200 m (660 ft) isobath. Apart from the Falklands Plateau (which lies to the east of the Falkland Islands), the seabed then falls by up to 10 m/km to 2,000 m (6,600 ft) and more.

The Falklands Trough separates the Patagonian Shelf from the Scotia Arc of isles that runs from Tierra del Fuego to South Georgia and the South Sandwich Islands along the northerly edge of the Scotia Sea in the Southern Ocean.
