= Brazil Current =

Water current along Brazil's southern coast

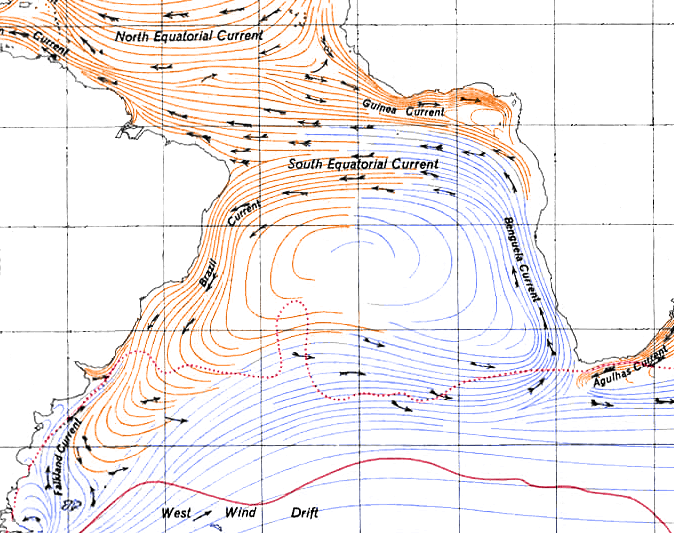
Brazil Current in a map of the Atlantic Ocean

The Brazil Current is a warm water current that flows south along the Brazilian south coast to the mouth of the Río de la Plata.

== Description ==
This current is caused by diversion of a portion of the Atlantic South Equatorial Current from where that current meets the South American continent. The Brazil Current begins at about 10–15˚S where the South Equatorial Current (SEC) splits near Cabo de São Roque, Brazil. The current reaches a depth of 700 m and the estimated transport at 12˚S is 2.5 Sv.

The transport increases as the current goes further south with 4 Sv at 15˚S. On the offshore side of the current an anticyclonic recirculation gyre at about 30˚S causes an increase of the Brazil Current’s transport. The estimated southward transport at 27˚S, 31˚S, 34˚S, and 36˚S are 11 Sv, 17 Sv, 22 Sv, and 41 Sv. The total transport can be from 70 to 80 Sv by 36˚S with half of it being in the recirculation gyre. The Brazil Current is a part of the South Atlantic subtropical gyre. The southern side of the gyre consists of the eastward-flowing South Atlantic Current (SAC). The eastern boundary is the Benguela Current System (BCS). The north side consists of the SEC, which flows west and then splits with the north water becoming the North Brazil Current (NBC). The southern-flowing waters become the Brazil Current, which makes up the western boundary. It is a western boundary current like the Gulf Stream, and is its southern counterpart; however, it is considerably shallower and weaker. It flows south from the equator to the west wind drift. It joins the Falkland Current (Malvinas Current) at the Argentine Sea, making it a temperate sea. The Brazil-Falkland Confluence is where the Brazil Current begins to separate from the coast at about 36˚S and is where the saltier subtropical water of the Brazil Current meets the fresher subantarctic water of the Falkland Current.

The main transport of the current leaves the continental shelf at about 38˚S and the sea surface temperature at that latitude is estimated to be about 16–18˚C, although the latitude where the current separates from the coast has been thought to be farther north from July to September than from January to March. If the Falkland Current has low transport then the path of the Brazil Current is dominated by wind stress curl. However, if the Falkland Current transport is increased then the Brazil Current separates from the coast at the observed 38˚S latitude. The range of sea surface temperature and the salinity for the Brazil-Falkland Confluence is 7–18˚C and 33.6–36 psu. The Brazil Current region also contains six major water masses within the system: Upper Circumpolar Water (UCPW), Lower Circumpolar Water (LCPW), Central Water (CW), Antarctic Intermediate Water (AAIW), Antarctic Bottom Water (AABW), and North Atlantic Deep Water (NADW).
