= Falkland Current =

Northward cold water Atlantic Ocean current

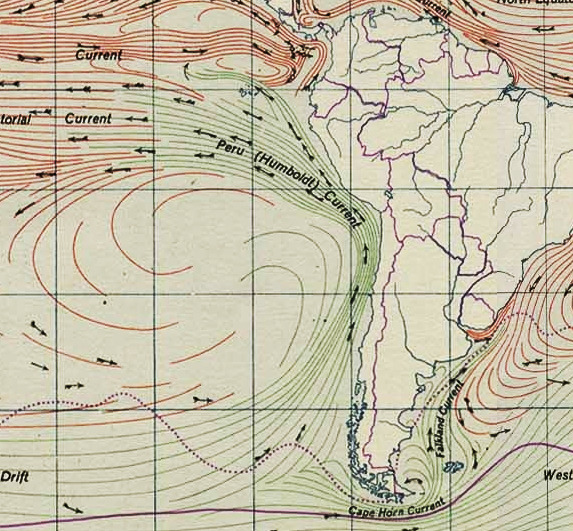
Humboldt current

The Falkland Current (also known as the Malvinas Current) is a cold water current that flows northward along the Atlantic coast of Patagonia as far north as the mouth of the Río de la Plata. This current results from the movement of water from the West Wind Drift as it rounds Cape Horn. It takes its name from the Falkland Islands (Spanish: Islas Malvinas). This cold current mixes with the tropical Brazil Current in the Argentine Sea (see Brazil–Falkland Confluence), giving it its temperate climate.

The current is an equatorward flowing current that carries cold and relatively fresh subantarctic water. The Falkland Current is a branch of the Antarctic Circumpolar Current. It transports between 60 and 90 Sverdrups of water with speeds ranging from a half a meter to a meter per second. Hydrographic data in this area is very scarce and thus various hydrographic variables have a great deal of error. The Falkland Current is not a surface current like the Brazil Current but it extends all the way to the sea-floor. Typical temperatures for the current are around 6 °C, with a salinity of 33.5–34.5 psu.

== See also ==
- Argentine Sea – Sea within the continental shelf off the Argentine mainland
- Ocean current – Directional mass flow of oceanic water
- Ocean gyre – Any large system of circulating ocean surface currents
