= Integrated Marine and Coastal Regionalisation of Australia =

Regionalisation of oceanic waters of Australia

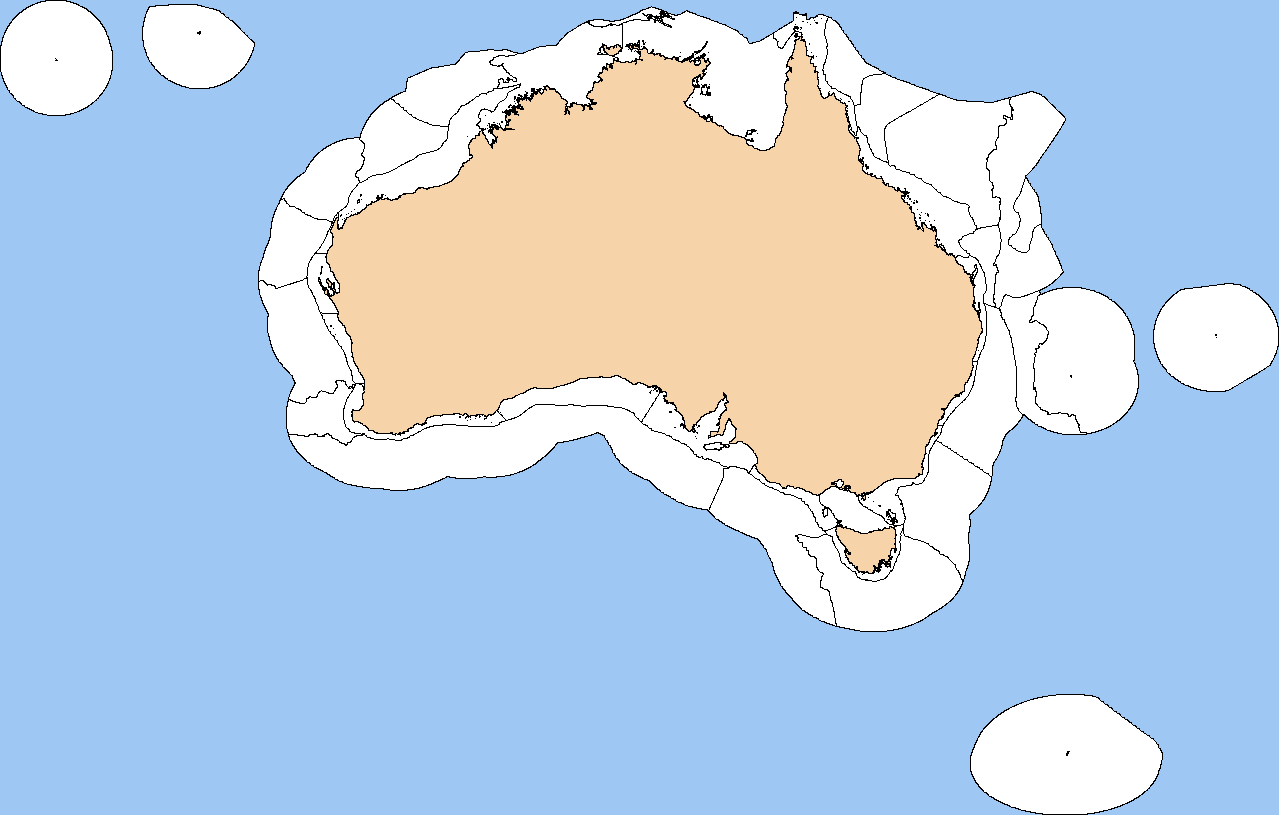
IMCRA 4.0 provincial bioregions

The Integrated Marine and Coastal Regionalisation of Australia (IMCRA), formerly the Interim Marine and Coastal Regionalisation for Australia (IBRA), is a biogeographic regionalisation of the oceanic waters of Australia's exclusive economic zone (EEZ). As of 2008, the most recent version is IMCRA Version 4.0.

IMCRA actually defines two bioregionalisations: a benthic bioregionalisation, based on biogeography of fish together with geophysical data; and a pelagic bioregionalisation, base on oceanographic characteristics.

The benthic bioregionalisation incorporates three separate regionalisations:

1. A regionalisation of the EEZ into provincial bioregions, based on the biogeography of bottom dwelling fishes. In IMCRA 4.0, 41 provincial bioregions, consisting of 24 provinces and 17 transitions.
2. A regionalisation of the continental shelf into meso-scale regions based on biological and physical characters, and the distance from the coast. In IMCRA 4.0 there are 60 meso-scale regions.
3. A regionalisation of the EEZ into 14 geomorphic units, formed by grouping the 1,134 geomorphic units defined by Geoscience Australia.

The pelagic bioregionalisation divides the continental shelf into four provincial bioregions based on pelagic fish species biodiversity and richness. Offshore waters are divided into three-dimensional water masses, taking into account water properties, circulation patterns and energetics.

== List of provincial bioregions ==
This is a list of IMCRA 4.0 provincial bioregions:

Bioregion	information	IMCRA meso-scale bioregions	Marine Ecoregions of the World designation
Bass Strait Shelf Province	cold temperate waters	Central Victoria (CV) Victoria Embayment (VE), Central Bass Strait (CBS), Boags (BGS)	Bassian (205)
Cape Province		na	na
Central Eastern Shelf Province	warm temperate waters	Manning Shelf (MAN), Hawkesbury Shelf (HAW)	Manning-Hawkesbury (203)
Central Eastern Shelf Transition	transition between the tropical Northeast Shelf and warm-temperate Central Eastern Shelf provinces	Tweed-Moreton (TM)	Tweed-Moreton (202)
Central Eastern Province		na	na
Central Eastern Transition		na	na
Central Western Shelf Province	subtropical waters	Shark Bay (SBY), Zuytdorp (ZUY)	Shark Bay (210)
Central Western Shelf Transition	transition	Ningaloo (NIN)	Ningaloo (145)
Central Western Province	subtropical waters	na	na
Central Western Transition		na	na
Christmas Island Province	tropical waters		Cocos-Keeling/Christmas Island (120)
Cocos (Keeling) Island Province	tropical waters		Cocos-Keeling/Christmas Island (120)
Great Australian Bight Shelf Transition	transition between the warm-temperate Southwest Shelf and Spencer Gulf Shelf provinces	Eucla (EUC), Murat (MUR)	Great Australian Bight (208)
Kenn Province	tropical waters	na	na
Kenn Transition			
Lord Howe Province	warm temperate waters		Lord Howe and Norfolk Islands (151)
Macquarie Island Province	cold temperate waters		Macquarie Island (212)
Norfolk Island Province	warm temperate waters		Lord Howe and Norfolk Islands (151)
Northeast Shelf Province	tropical waters	West Tropic Coast (WTC), Central Reef (CR), Lucinda-Mackay Coast (LMC), Shoalwater Coast (SC), Mackay-Capricorn (MC), Pompey-Swains (PS)	Central and Southern Great Barrier Reef (143)
Northeast Shelf Transition	transition between the tropical Northern Shelf and Northeast Shelf provinces	Torres Strait (TS), East Cape York (ECY), Ribbons (RBN)	Torres Strait and Northern Great Barrier Reef (142)
Northeast Province	tropical waters	na	na
Northeast Transition		na	na
Northern Shelf Province	tropical waters	Van Diemens Gulf (VDG), Cobourg (COB), Arafura (ARA), Arnhem Wessel (AWS), Carpentaria (CAR), Groote (GRO), Pellew (PEL), Wellesley (WLY), Karumba-Nassau (KAN), West Cape York (WCY)	Arnhem Coast to Gulf of Carpentaria (140)
Northwest Province	tropical waters	na	na
Northwest Shelf Province	tropical waters	Pilbara (nearshore) (PIN), Pilbara (offshore) (PIO), Eighty Mile Beach (EMB), Canning (CAN), North West Shelf (NWS)	Exmouth to Broome (144)
Northwest Shelf Transition	transition between the tropical Northern Shelf and Northwest Shelf provinces	Kimberley (KIM), King Sound (KSD), Anson Beagle (ANB), Cambridge-Bonaparte (CAB), Bonaparte Gulf (BON), Tiwi (TWI)	Bonaparte Coast (141)
Northwest Transition		na	na
Southeast Shelf Transition	transition between the warm-temperate Central Eastern Shelf and the cold-temperate Bass Strait Shelf provinces	Batemans Shelf (BAT), Flinders (FLI), Twofold Shelf (TWO)	Cape Howe (204)
Southeast Transition		na	na
Southern Province	warm temperate waters	na	na
Southwest Shelf Province	warm temperate waters	Leeuwin–Naturaliste (LNE), Western Australia South Coast (WSC)	Leeuwin (209)
Southwest Shelf Transition	transition between the subtropical Central West Province and the warm temperate Southwest Shelf Province	Abrolhos Islands (ABR) and Central West Coast (CWC)	Houtman (211)
Southwest Transition		na	na
Spencer Gulf Shelf Province	warm temperate waters	Coorong (COR), Eyre (EYR), North Spencer Gulf (NSG), St Vincent Gulf (SVG), Spencer Gulf (SG)	South Australian Gulfs (207)
Tasmania Province	cold temperate waters	na	na
Tasmanian Shelf Province	cold temperate waters	Bruny (BRU), Davey (DAV), Franklin (FRA), Freycinet (FRT)	Bassian (205)
Timor Province	tropical waters	na	na
Timor Transition		na	na
West Tasmania Transition		na	na
Western Bass Strait Shelf Transition	transition between the cold-temperate Bass Strait Shelf and Tasmanian Shelf provinces and the warm-temperate Spencer Gulf Shelf Province	Otway (OTW)	Western Bassian (206)

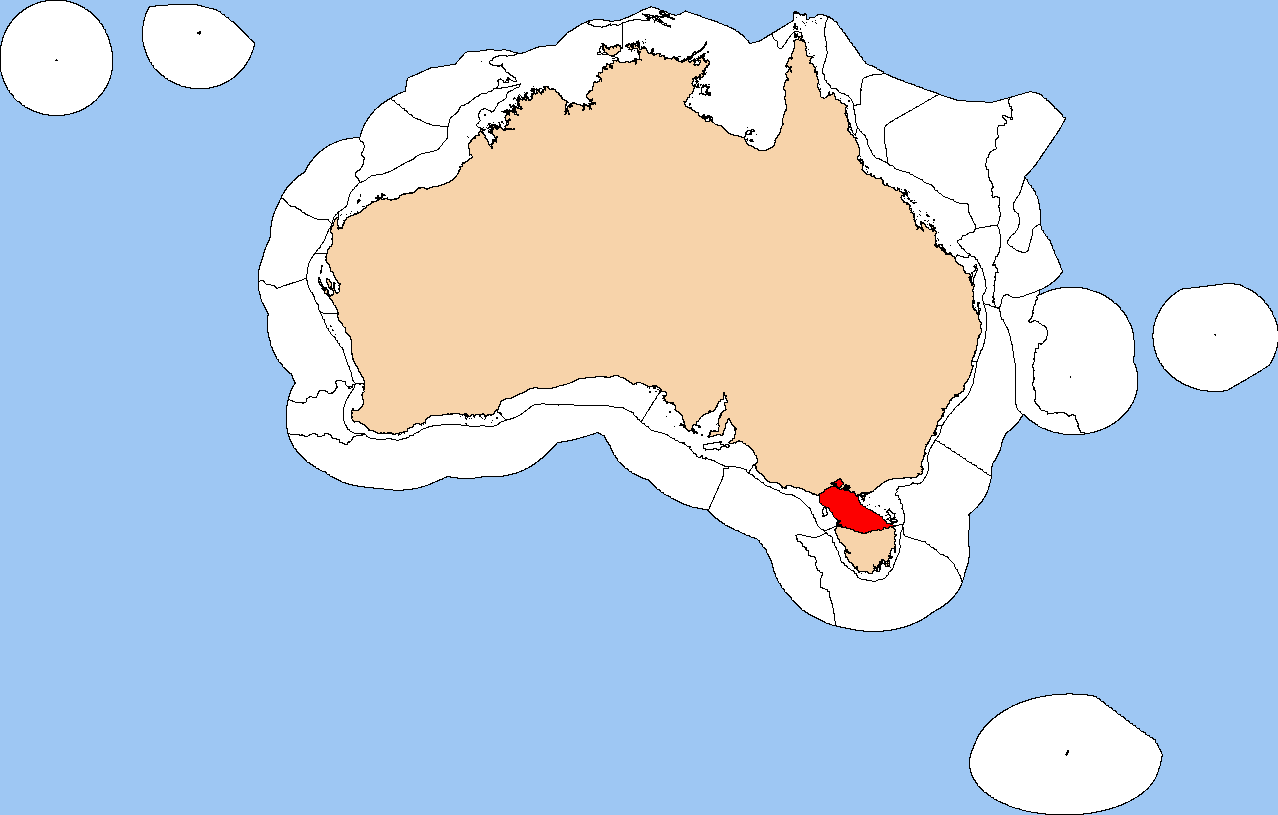
Bass Strait Shelf Province

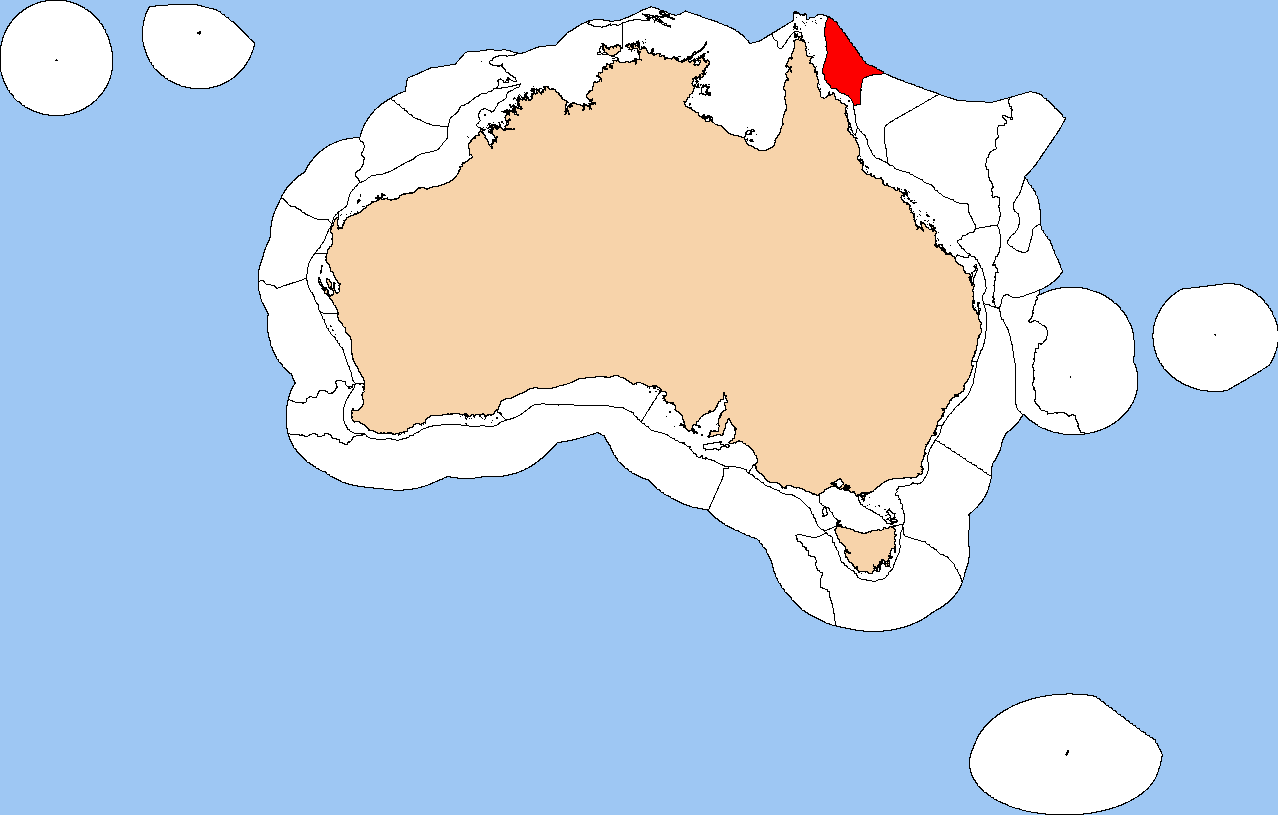
Cape Province

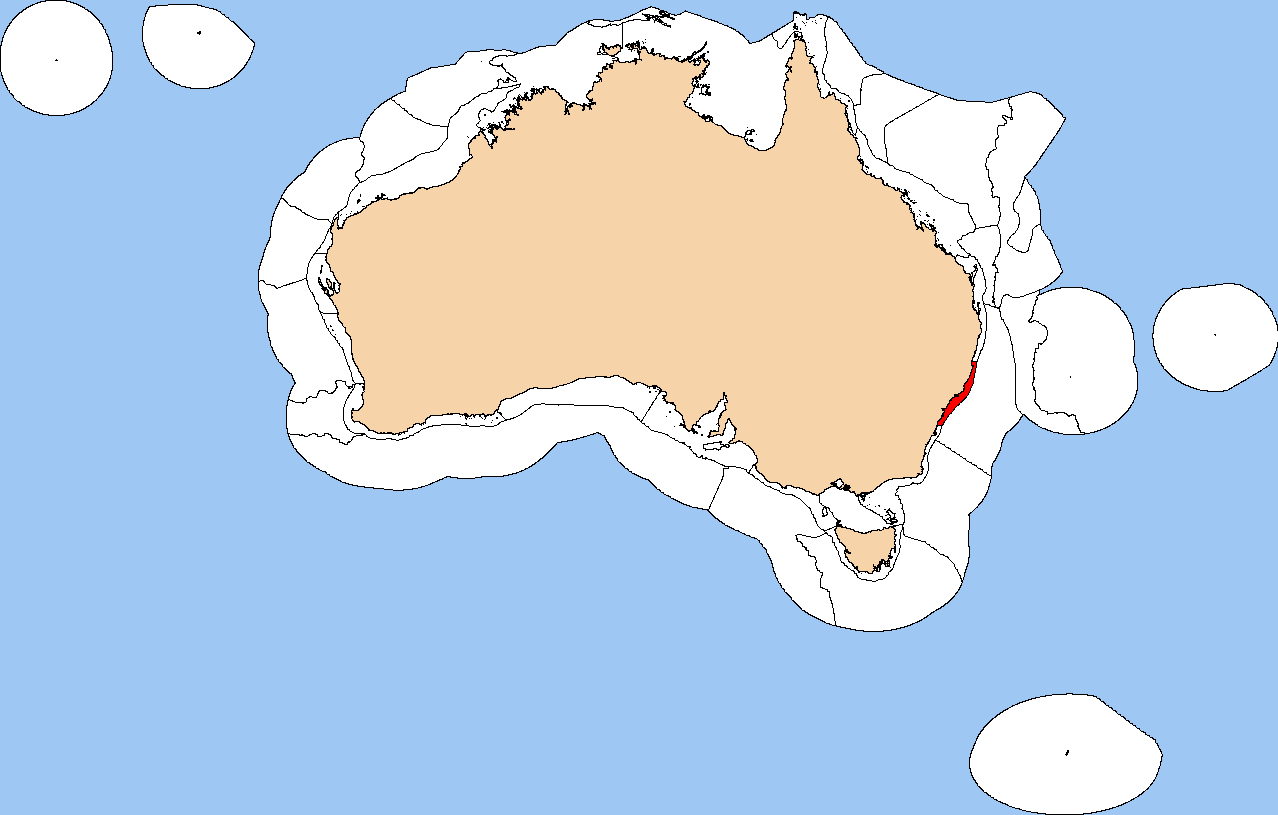
Central Eastern Shelf Province

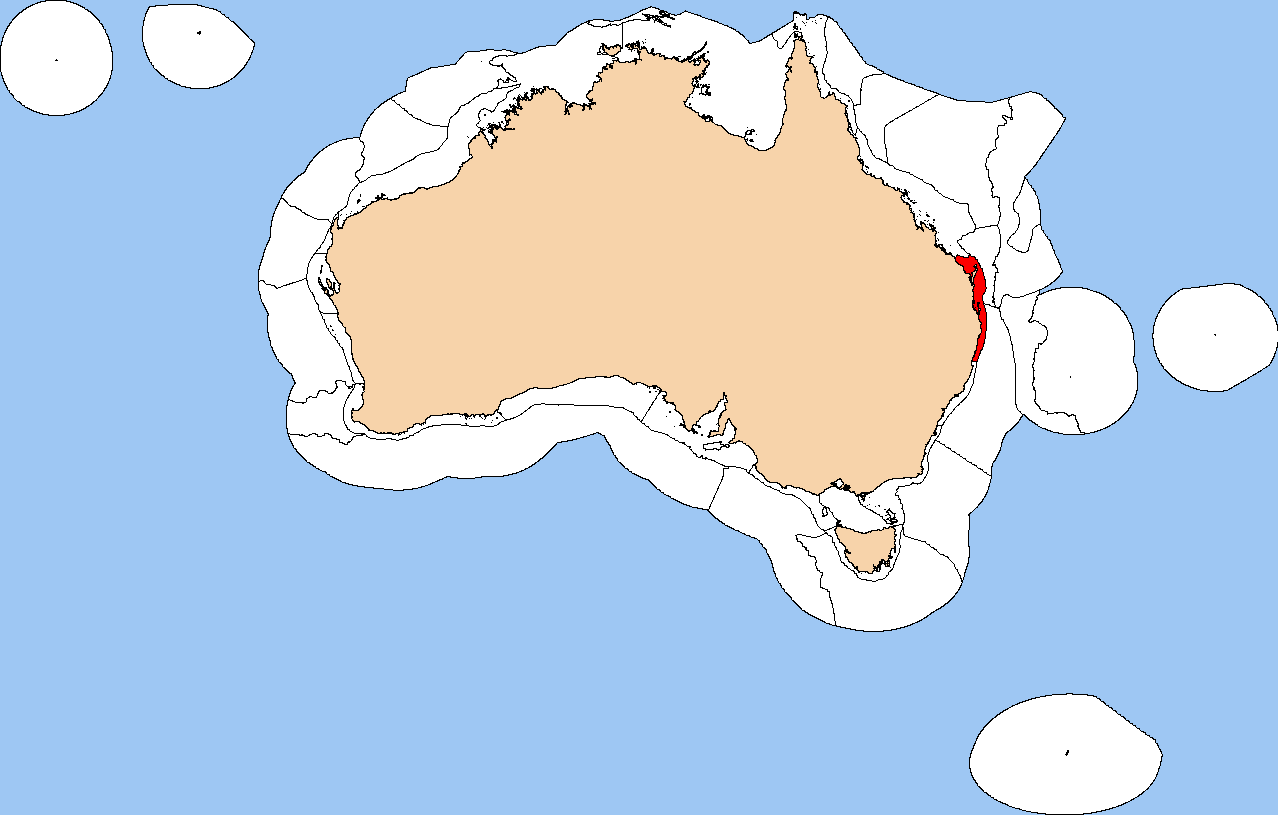
Central Eastern Shelf Transition

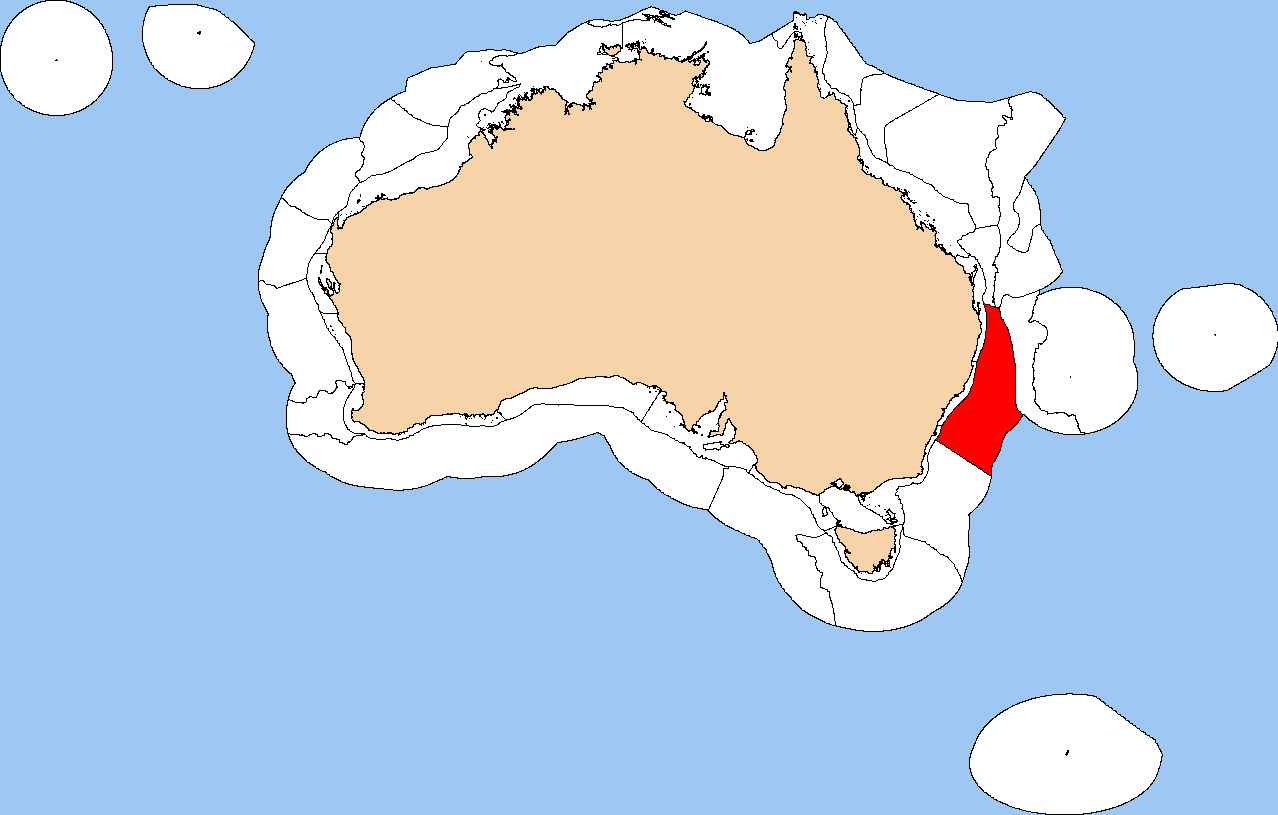
Central Eastern Province

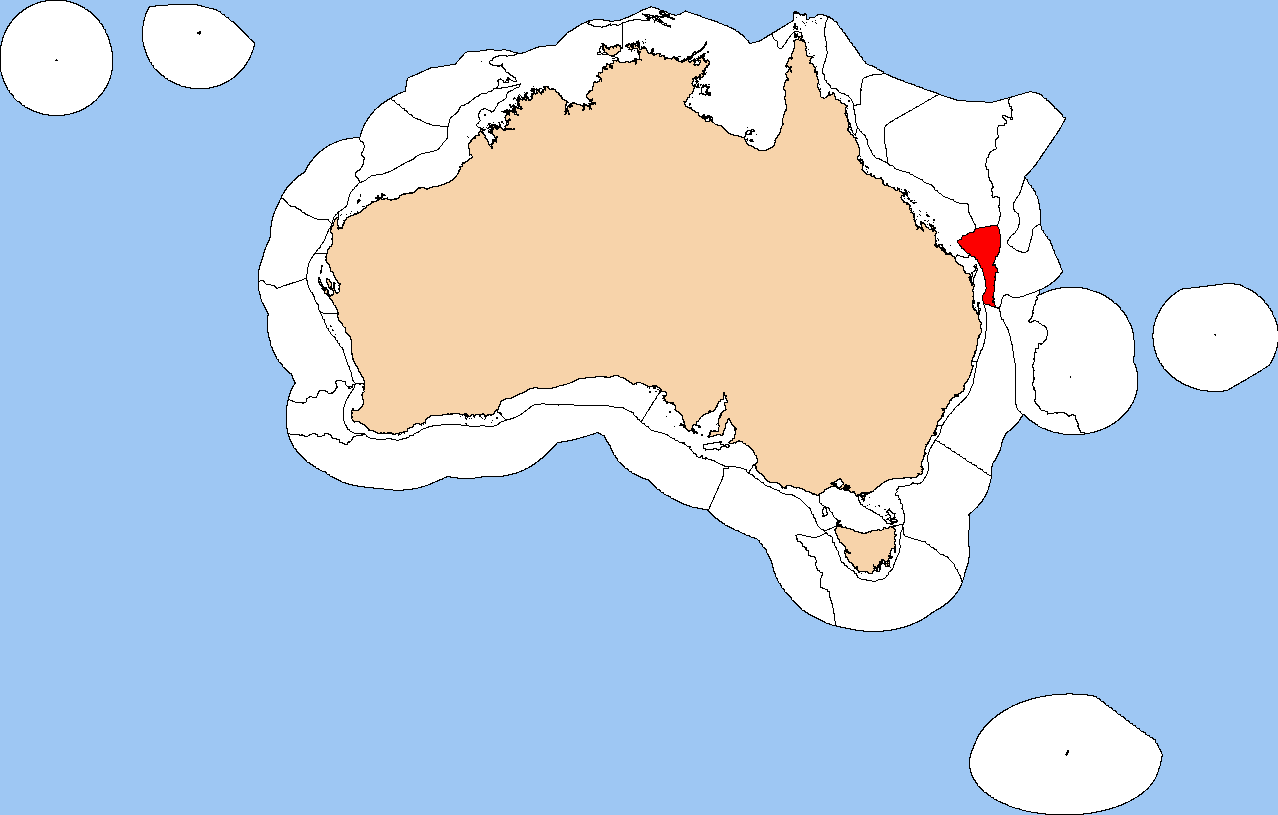
Central Eastern Transition

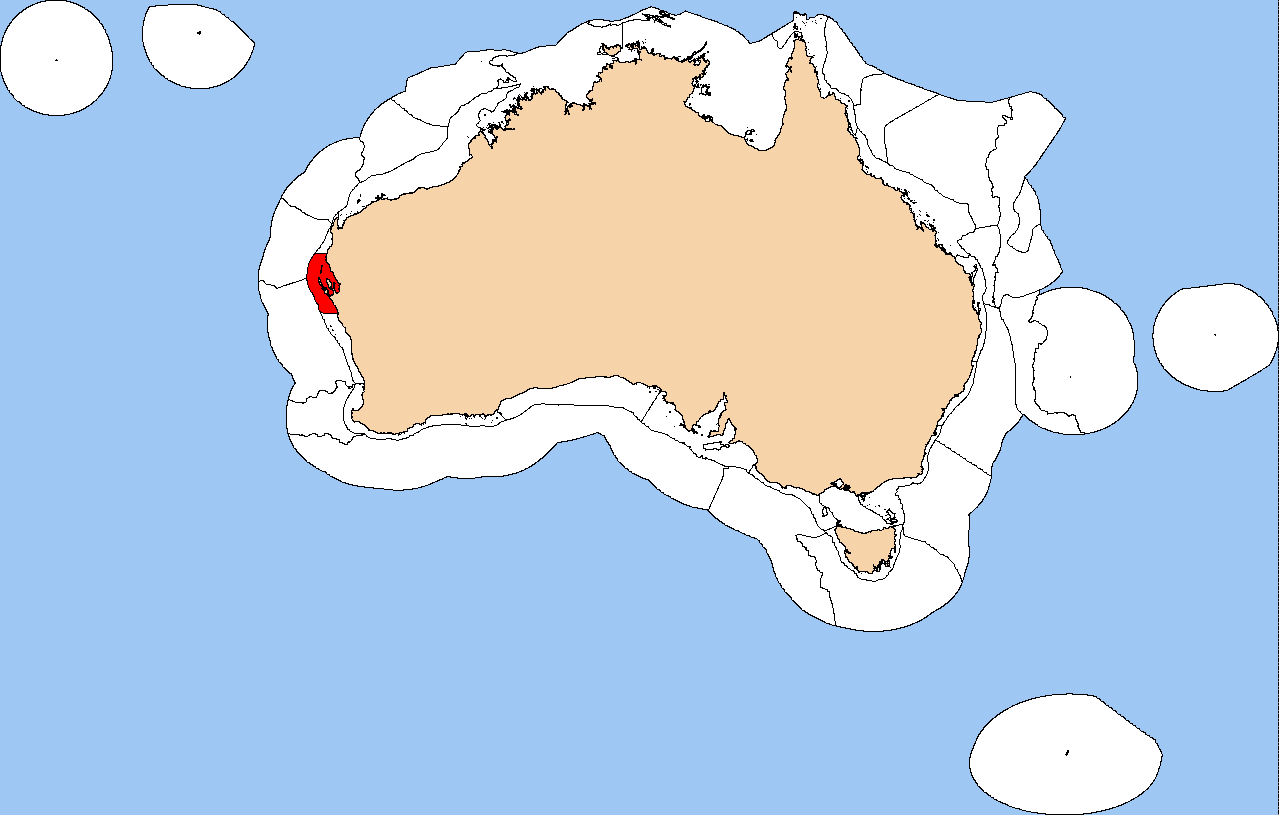
Central Western Shelf Province

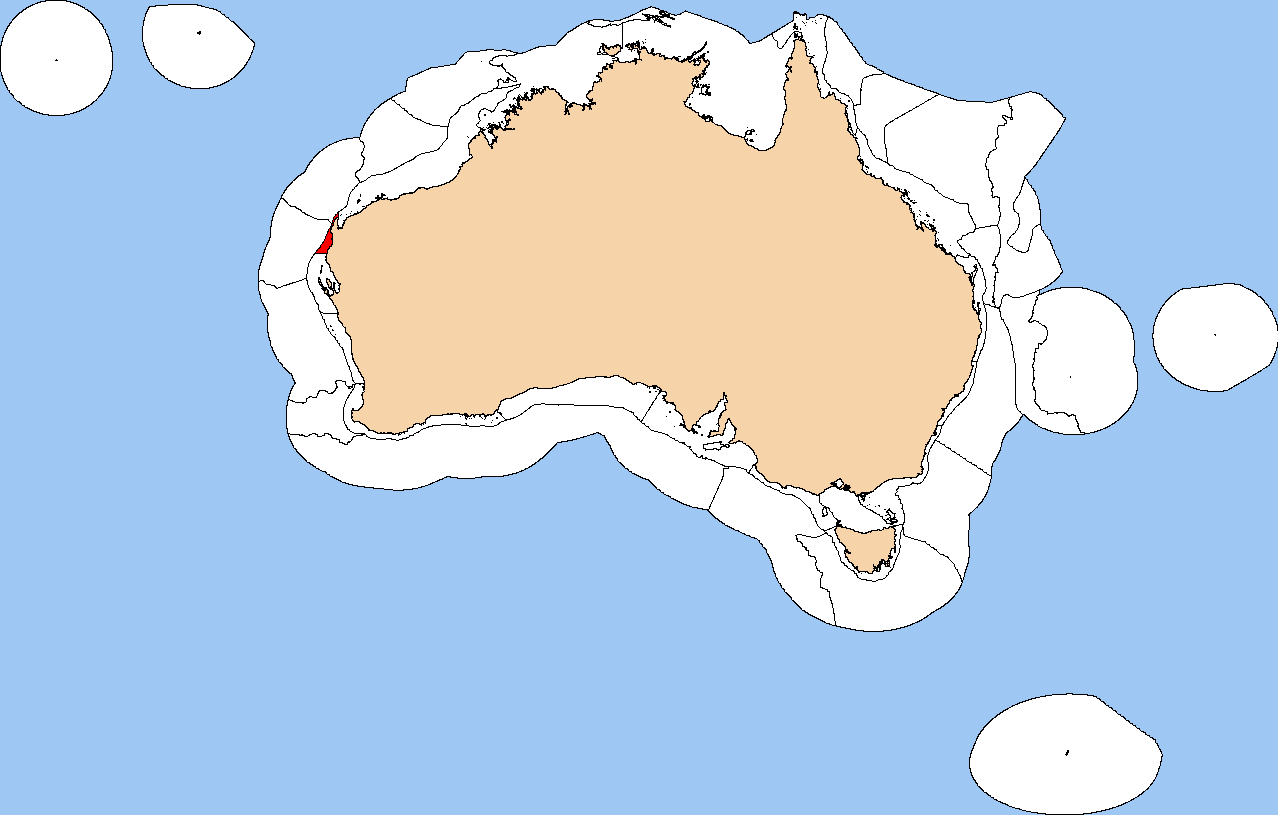
Central Western Shelf Transition

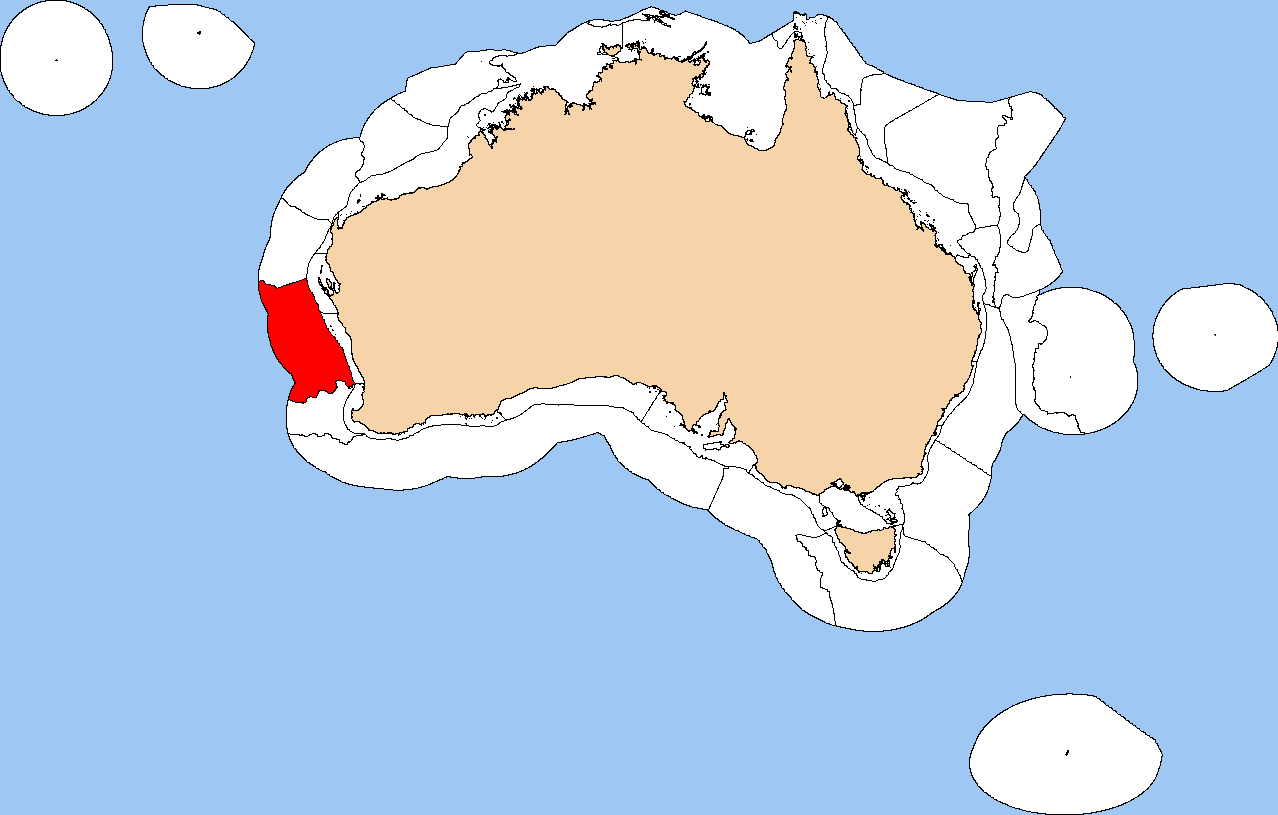
Central Western Province

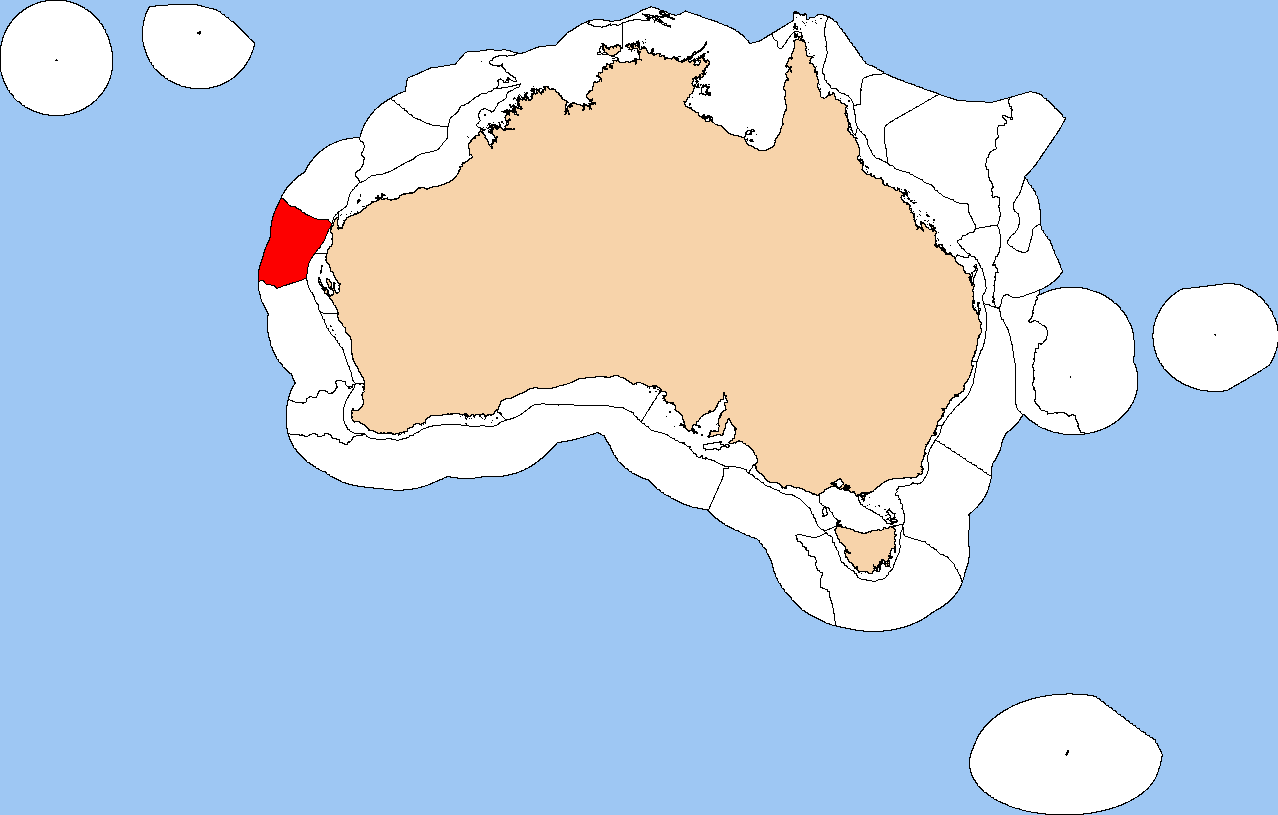
Central Western Transition

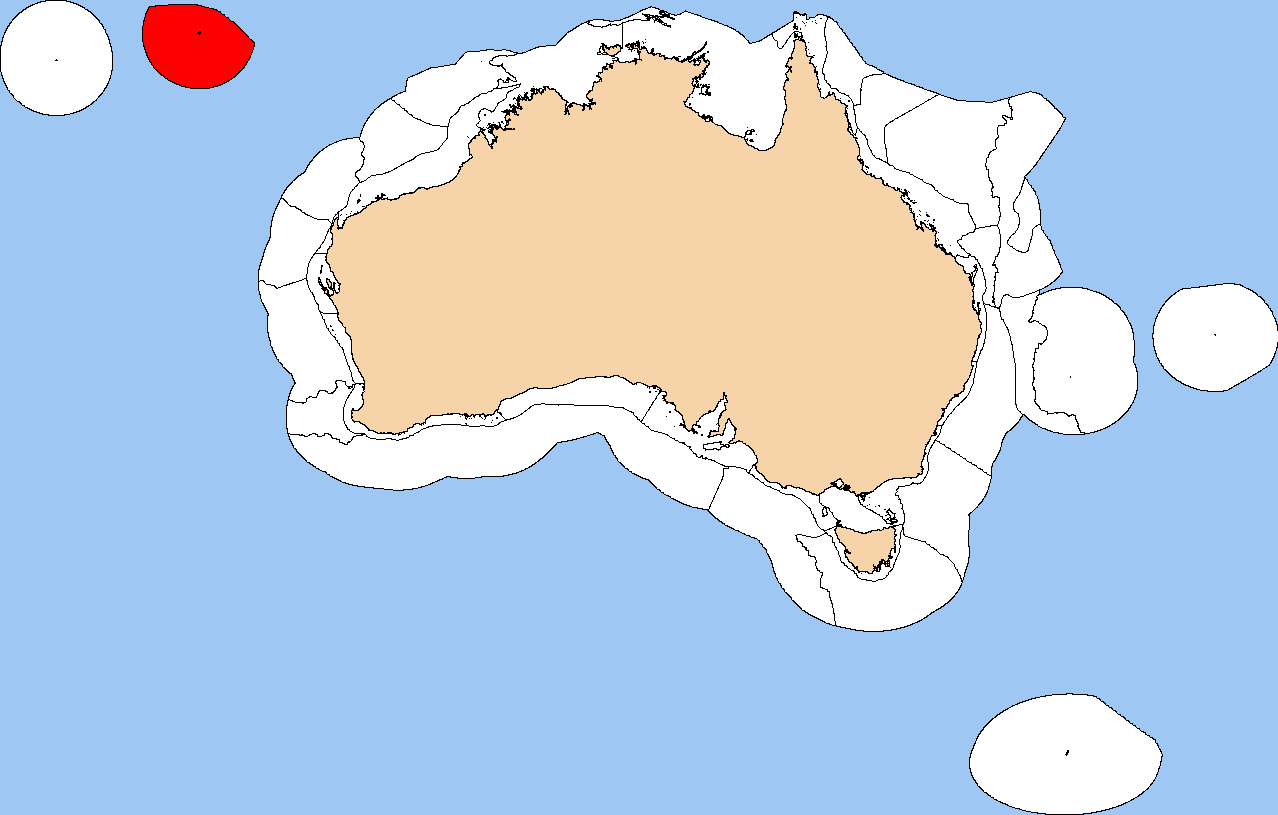
Christmas Island Province

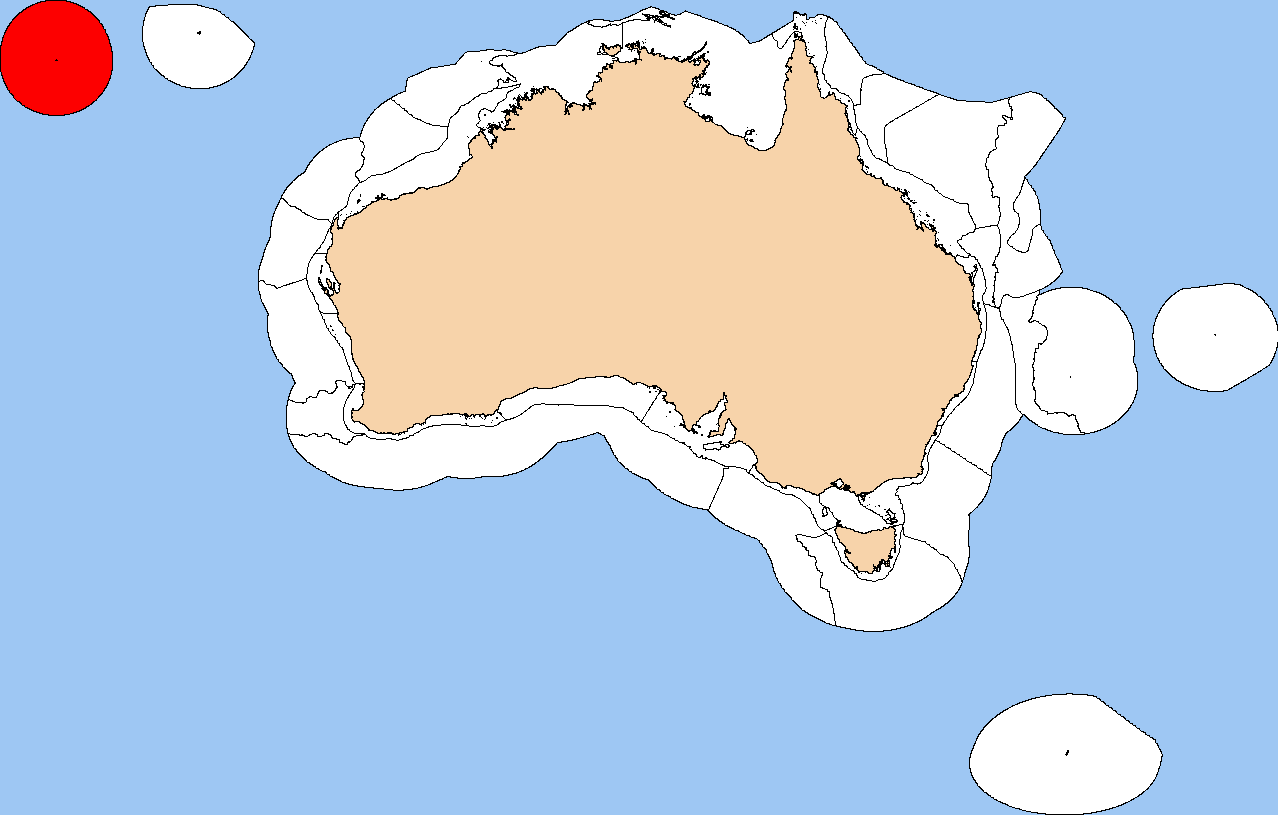
Cocos (Keeling) Island Province

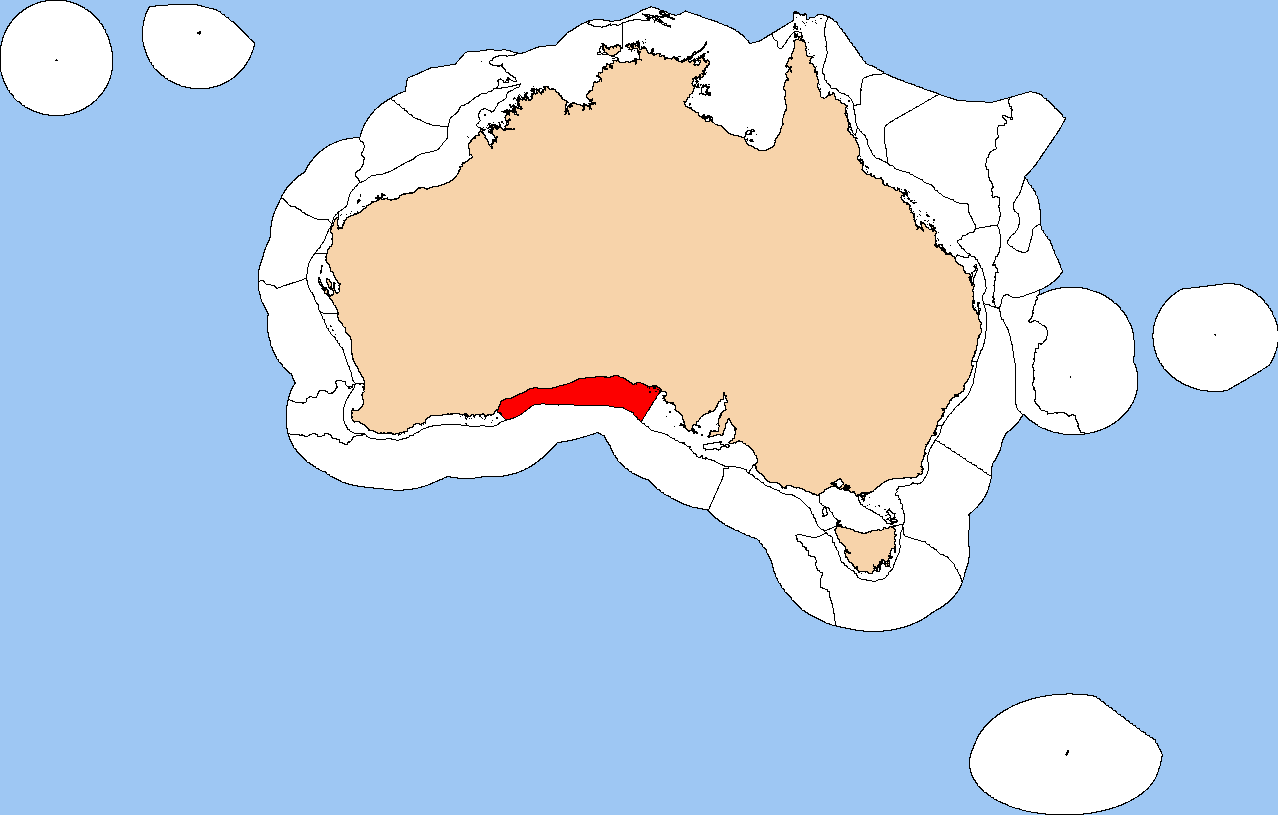
Great Australian Bight Shelf Transition

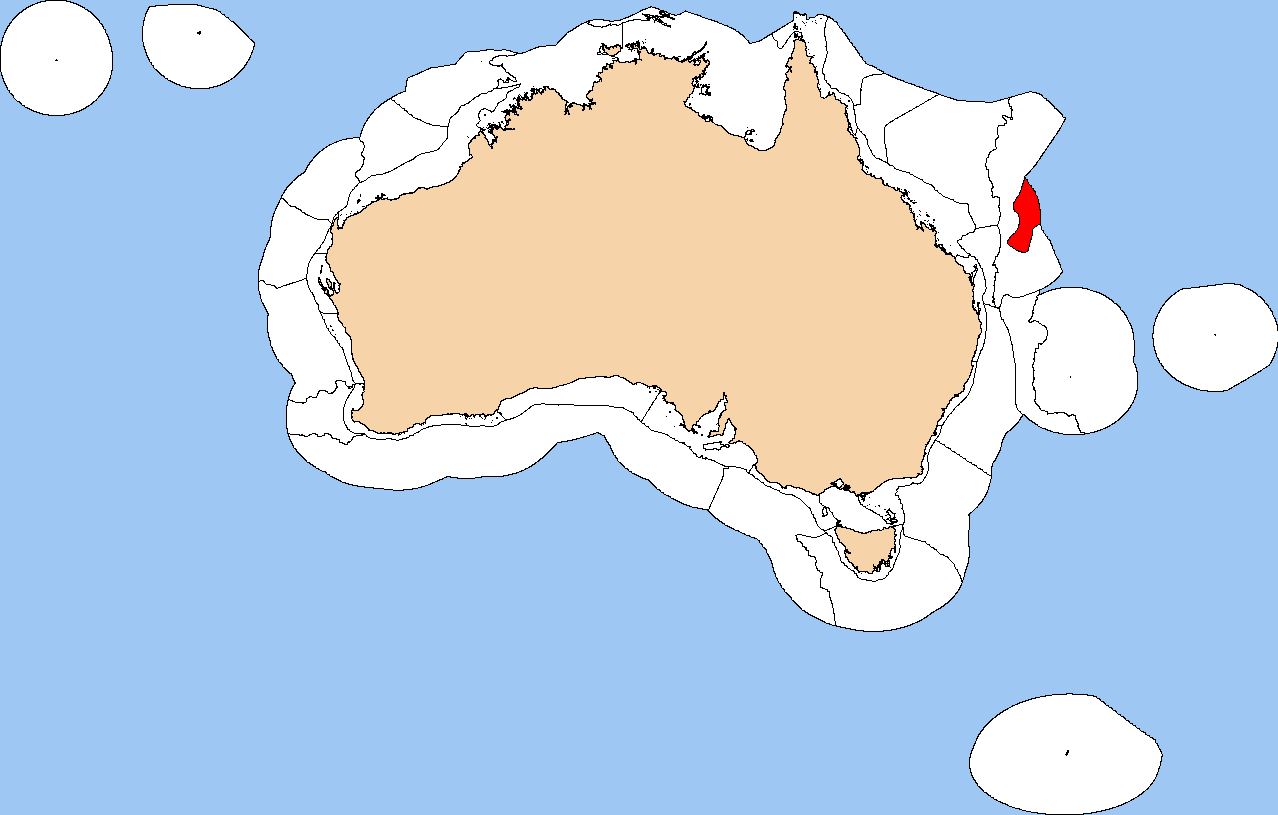
Kenn Province

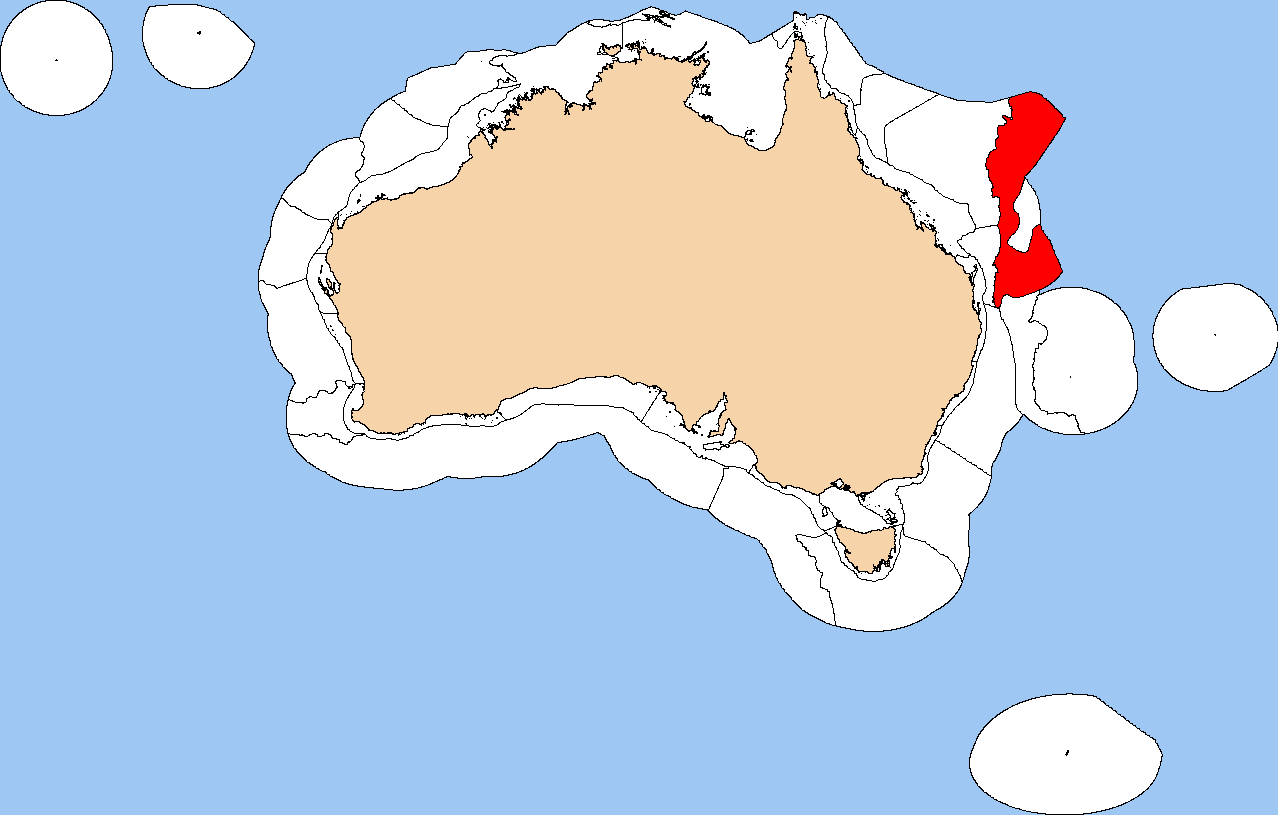
Kenn Transition

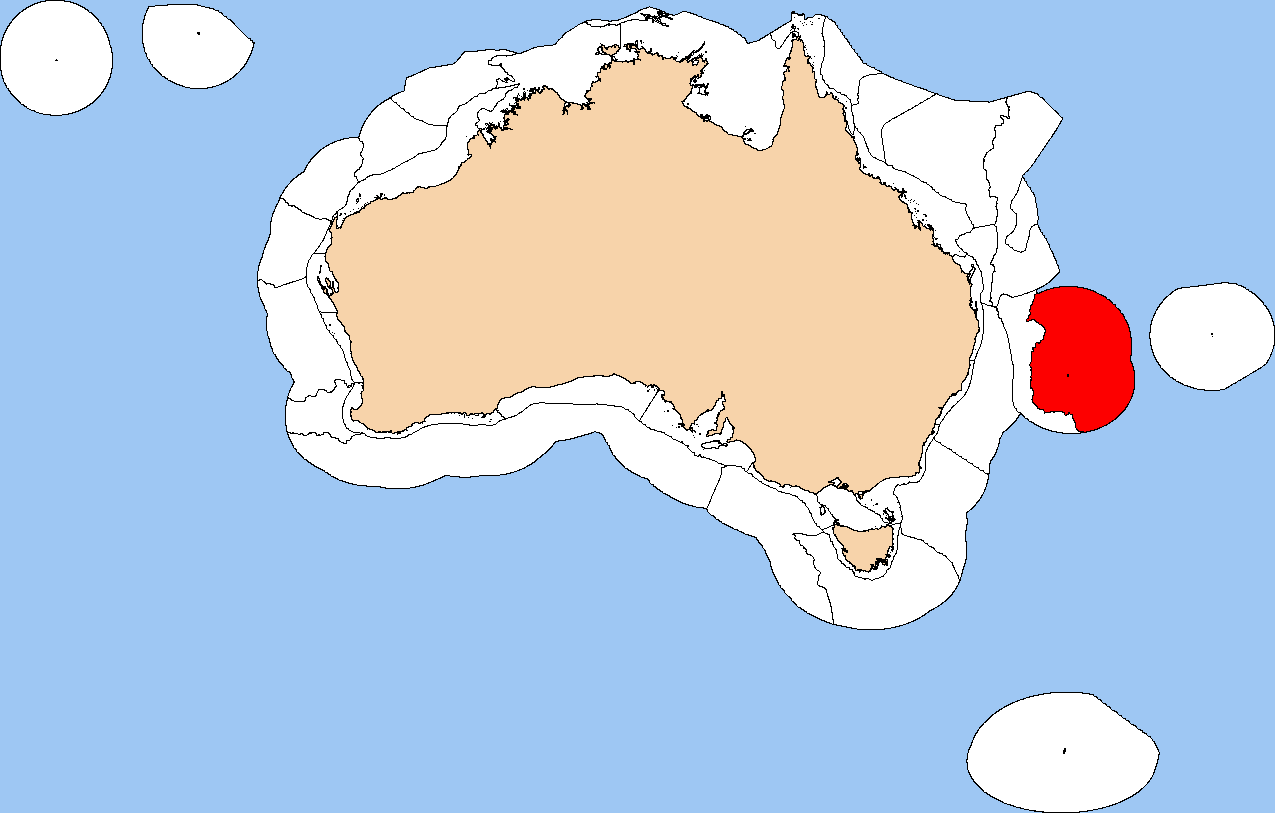
Lord Howe Province

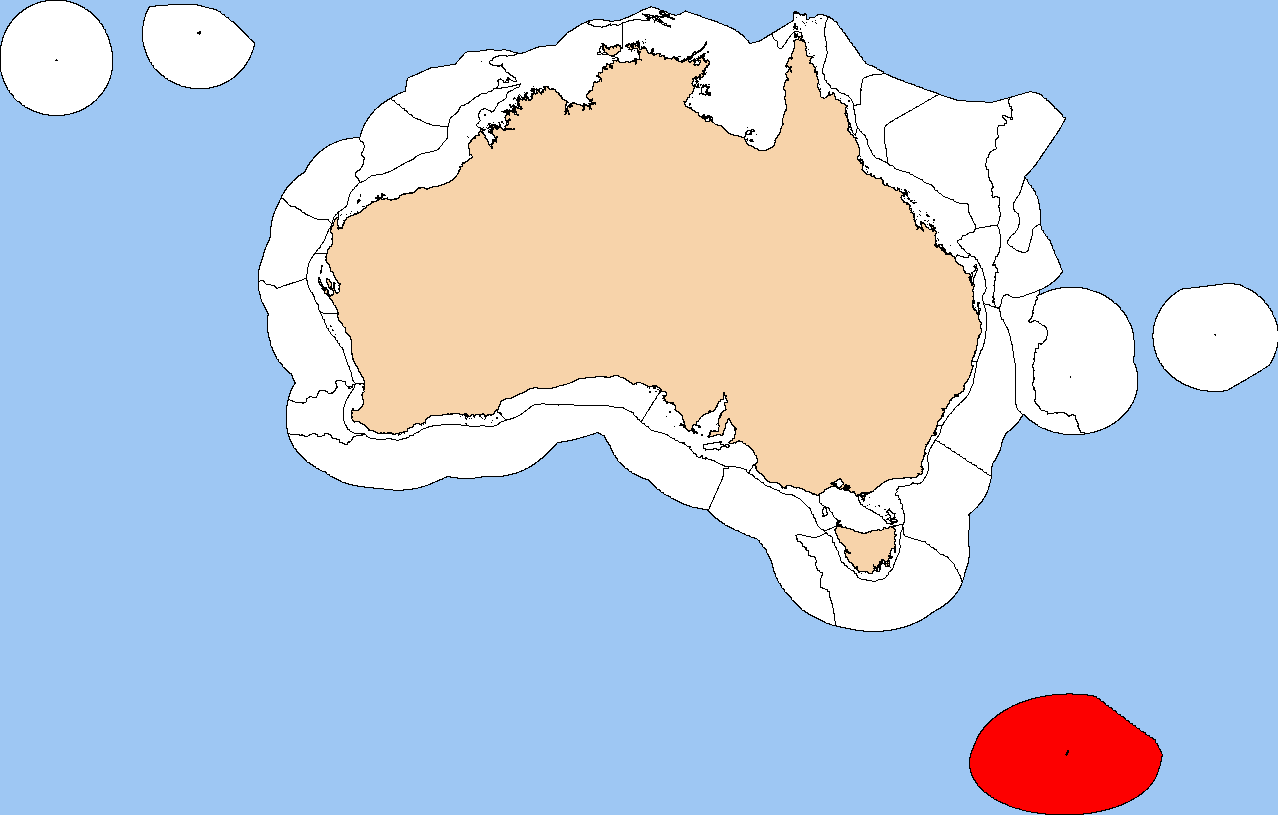
Macquarie Island Province

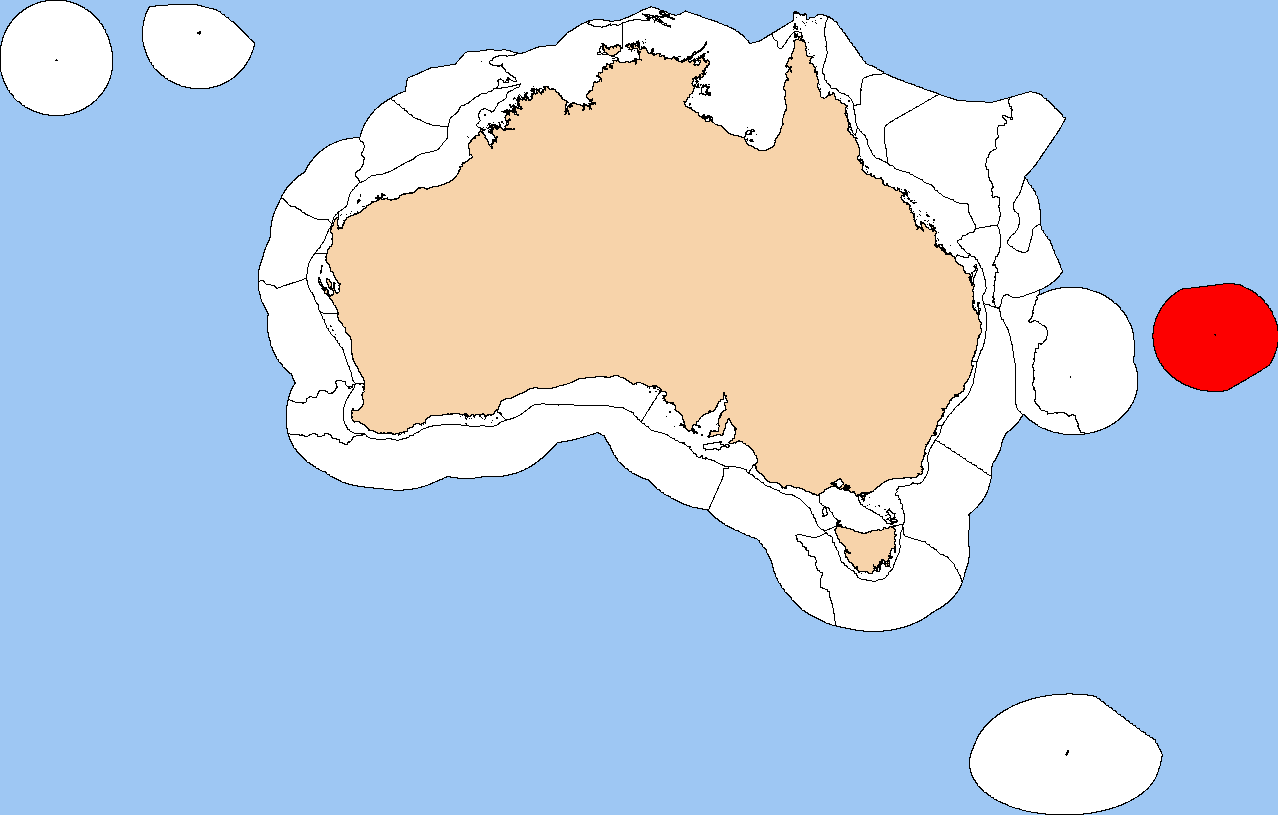
Norfolk Island Province

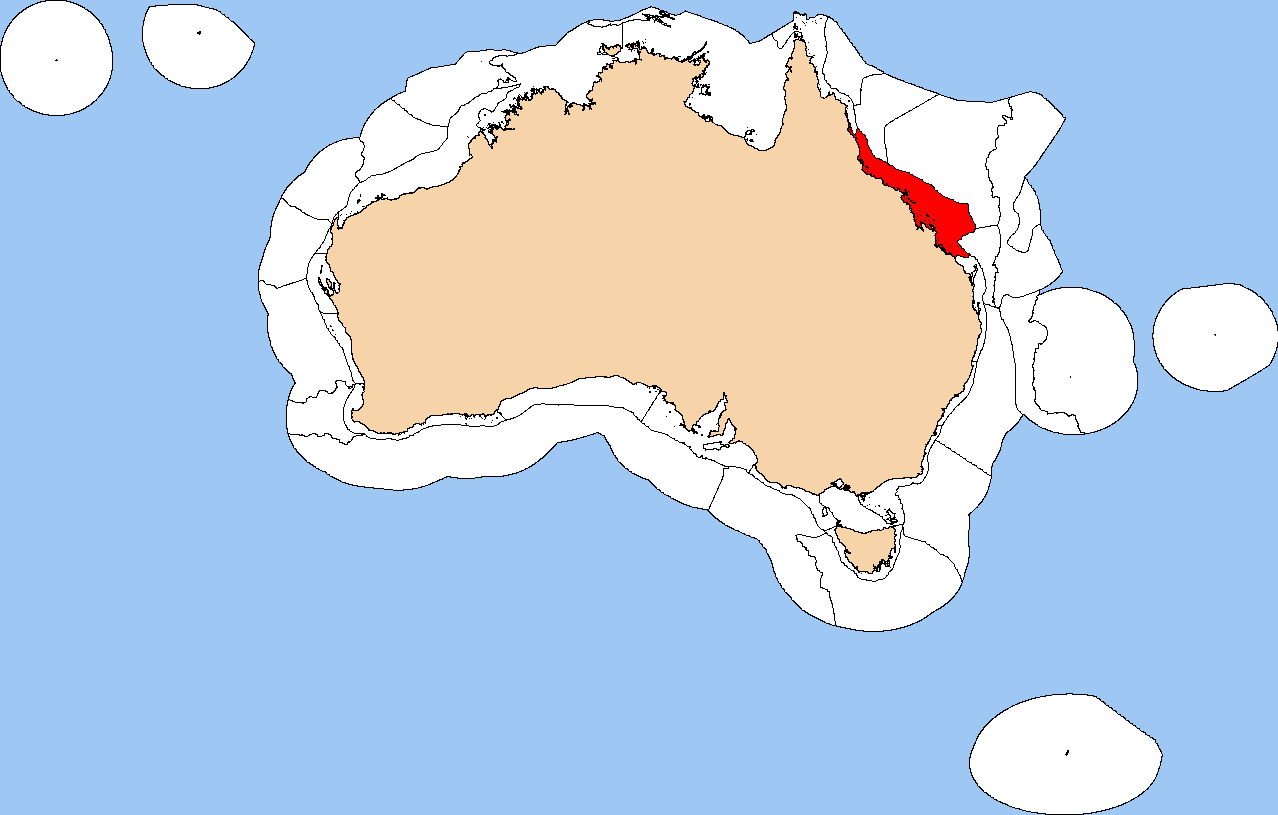
Northeast Shelf Province

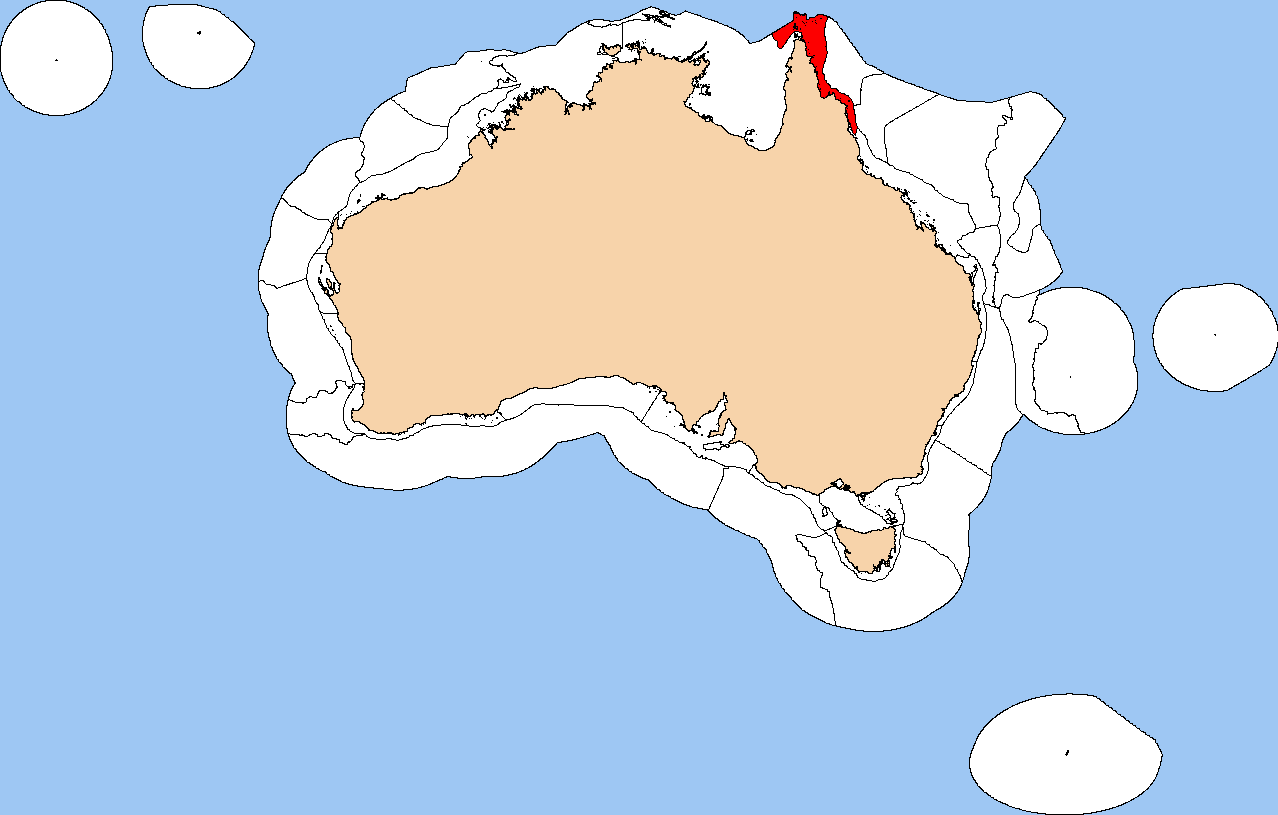
Northeast Shelf Transition

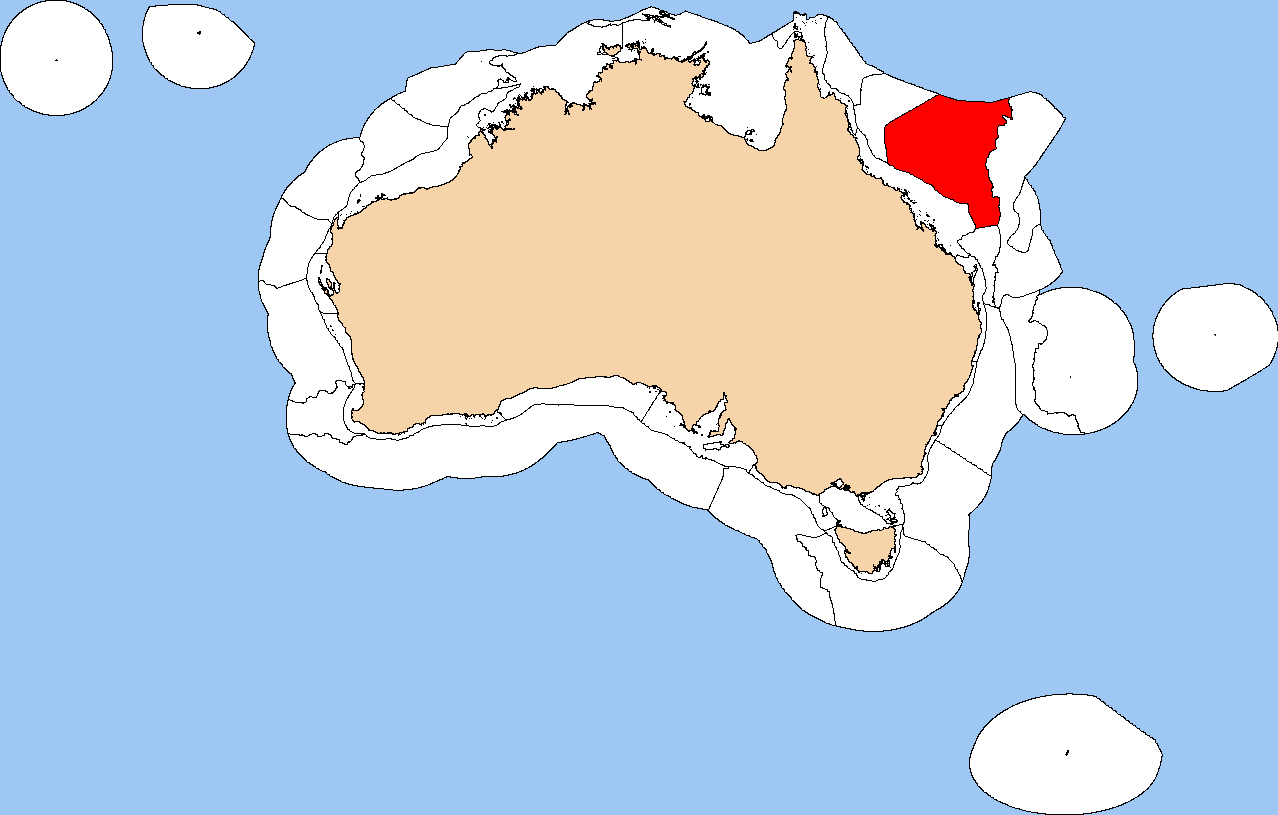
Northeast Province

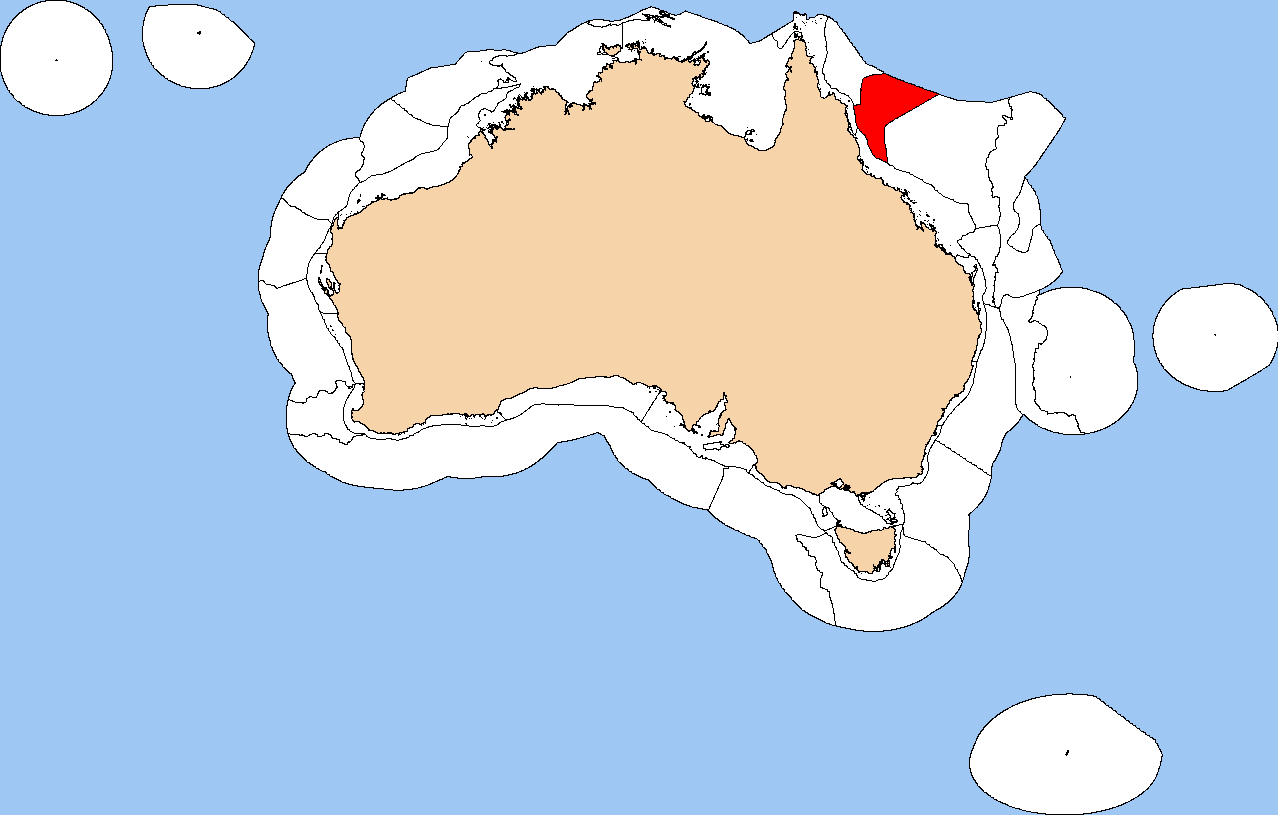
Northeast Transition

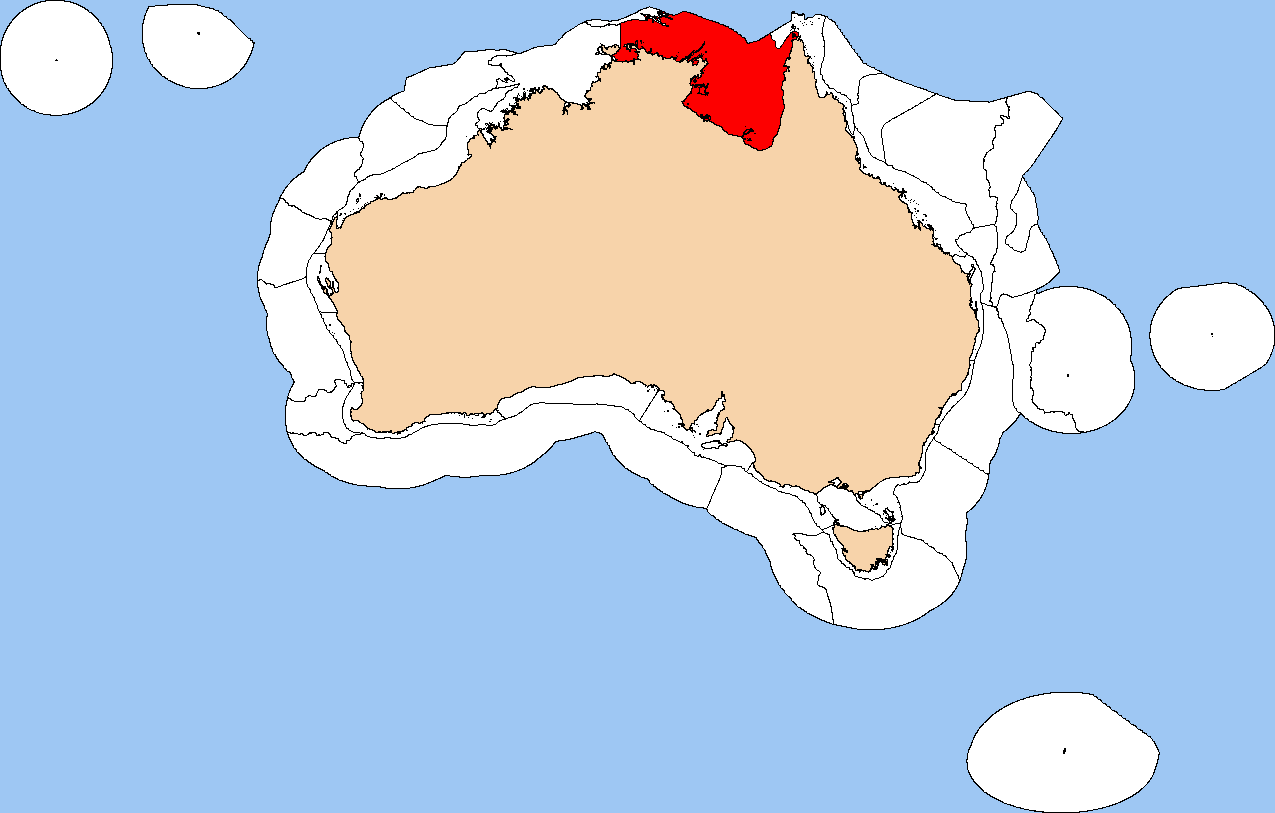
Northern Shelf Province

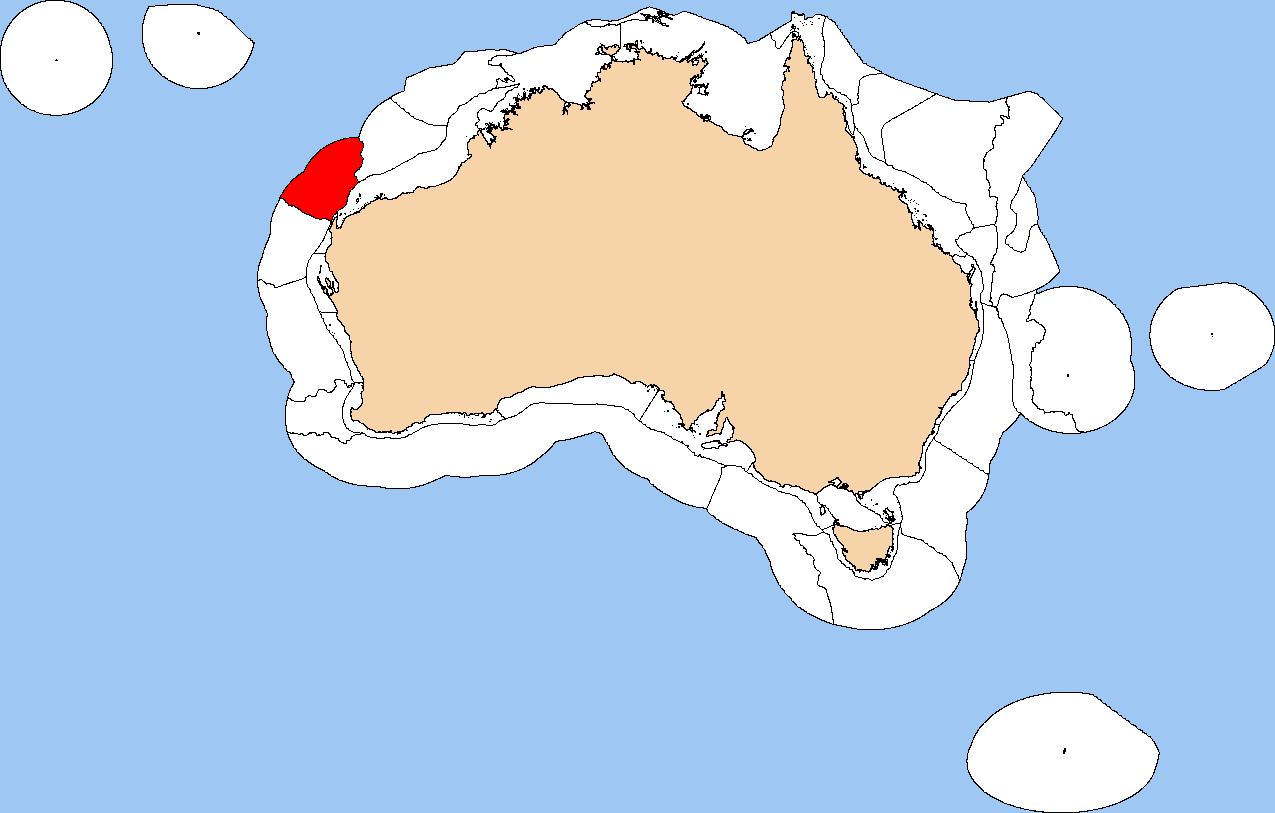
Northwest Province

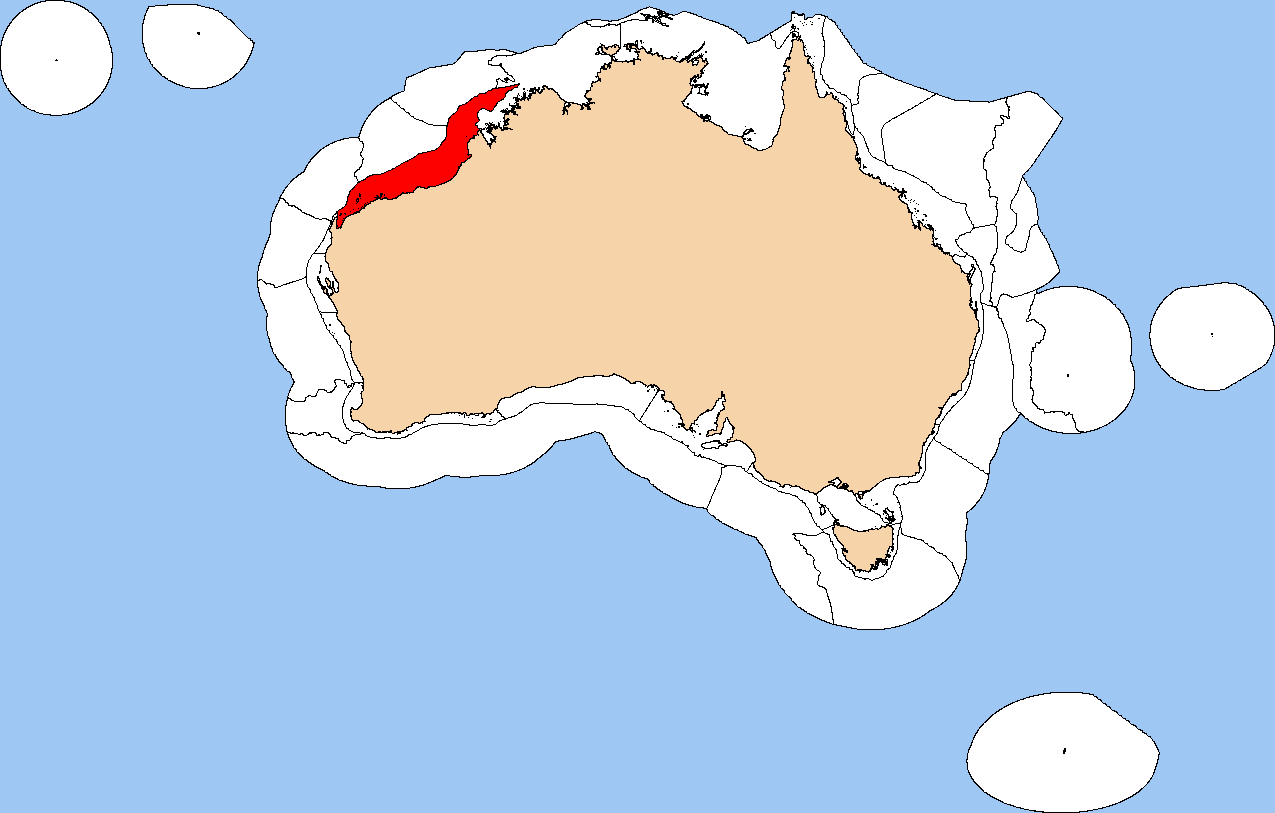
Northwest Shelf Province

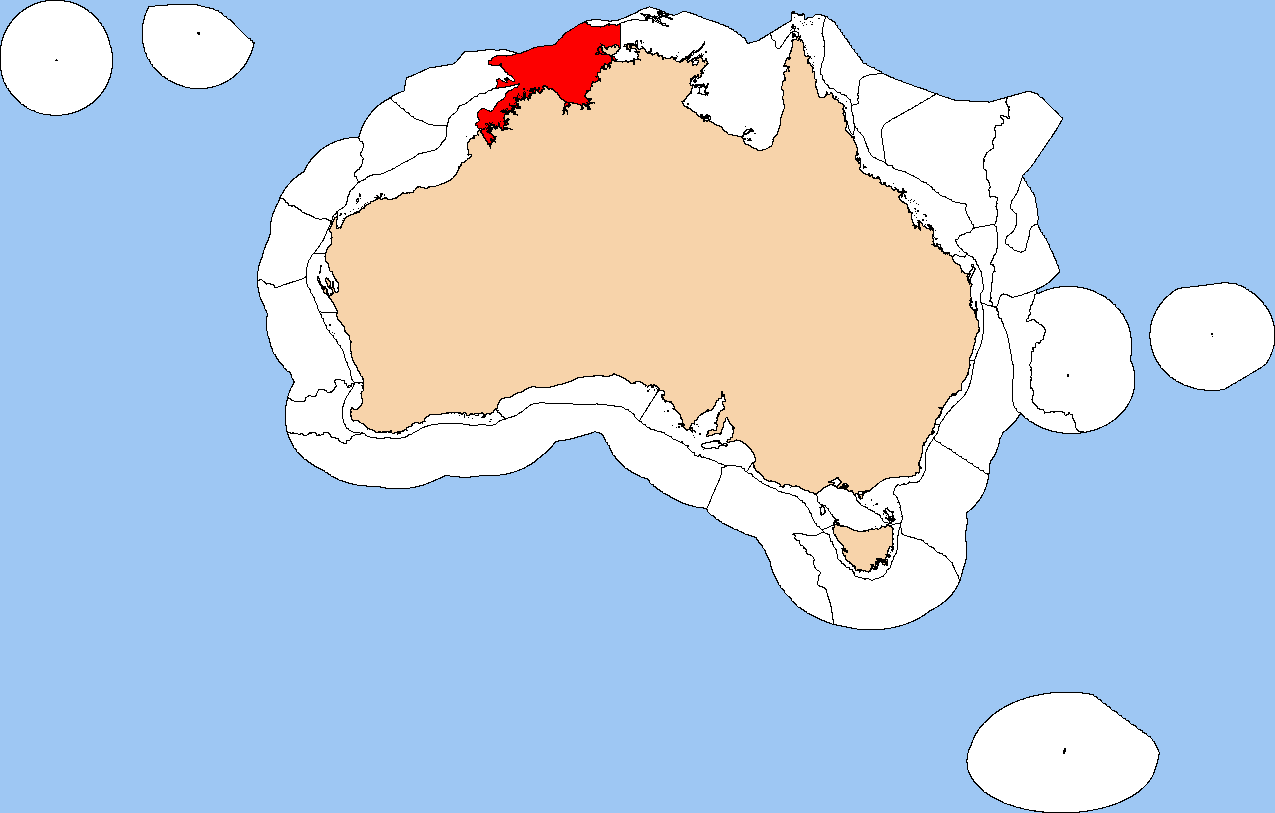
Northwest Shelf Transition

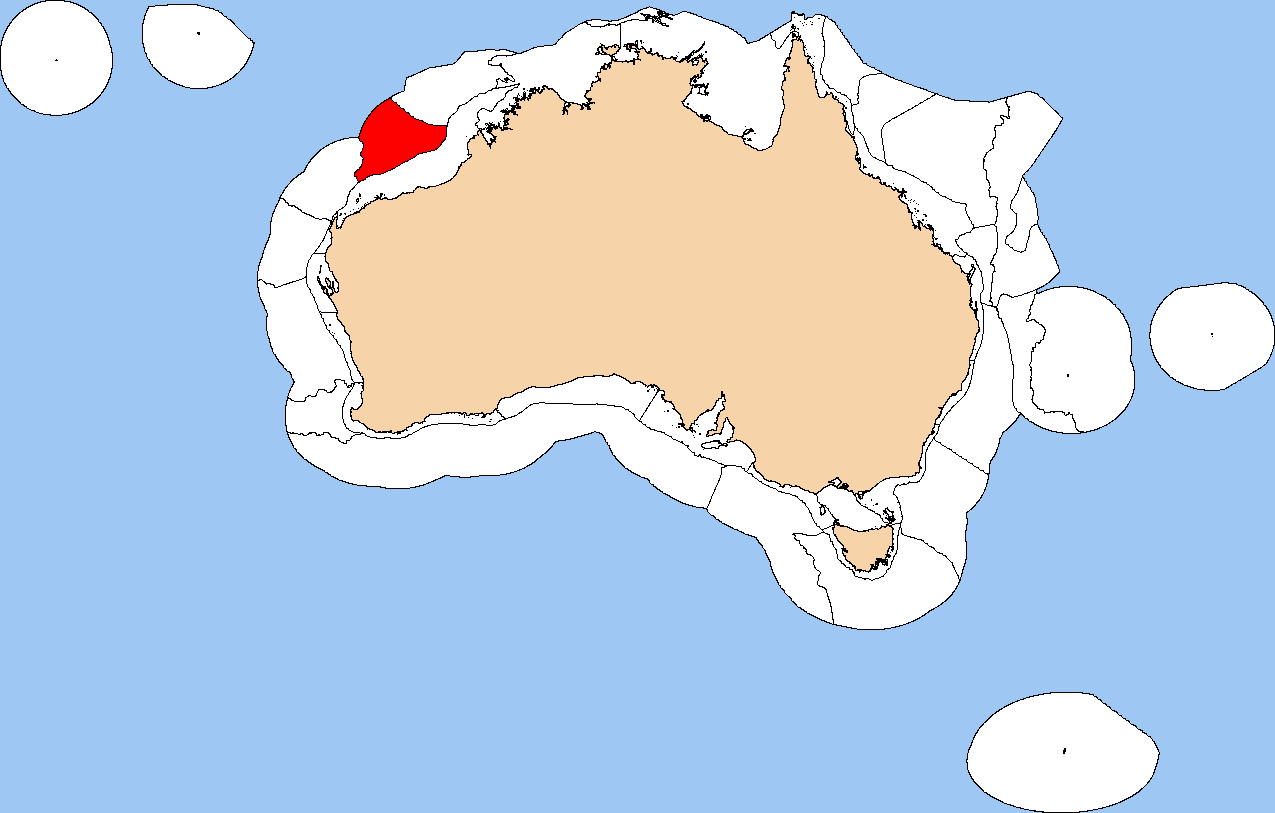
Northwest Transition

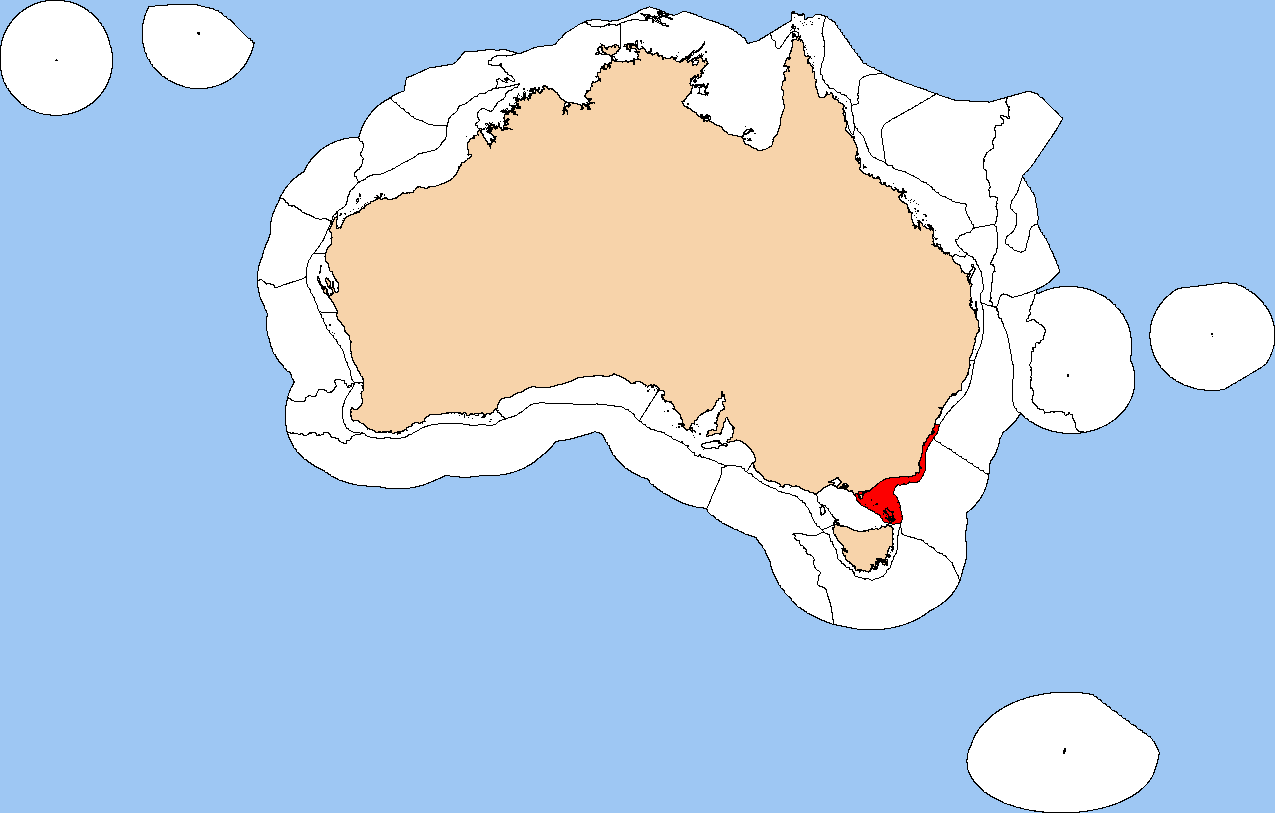
Southeast Shelf Transition

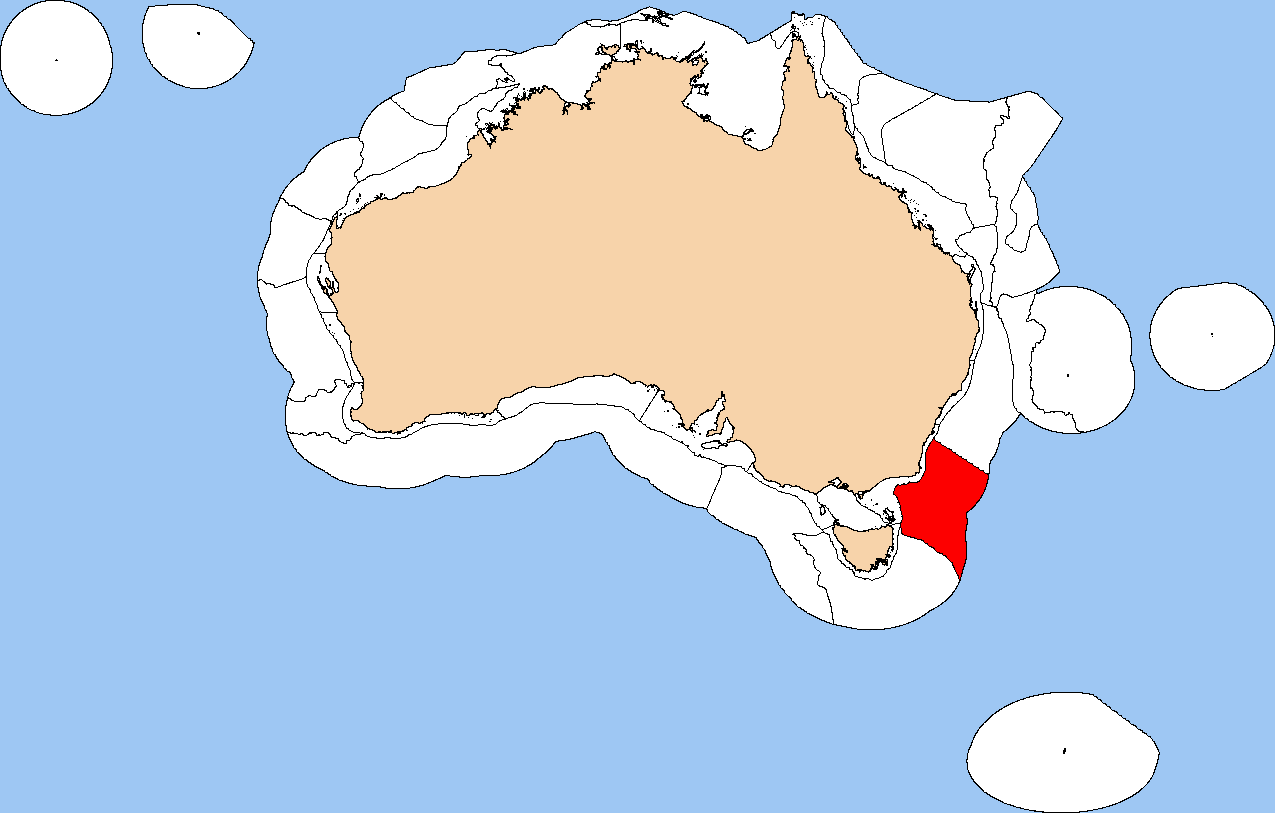
Southeast Transition

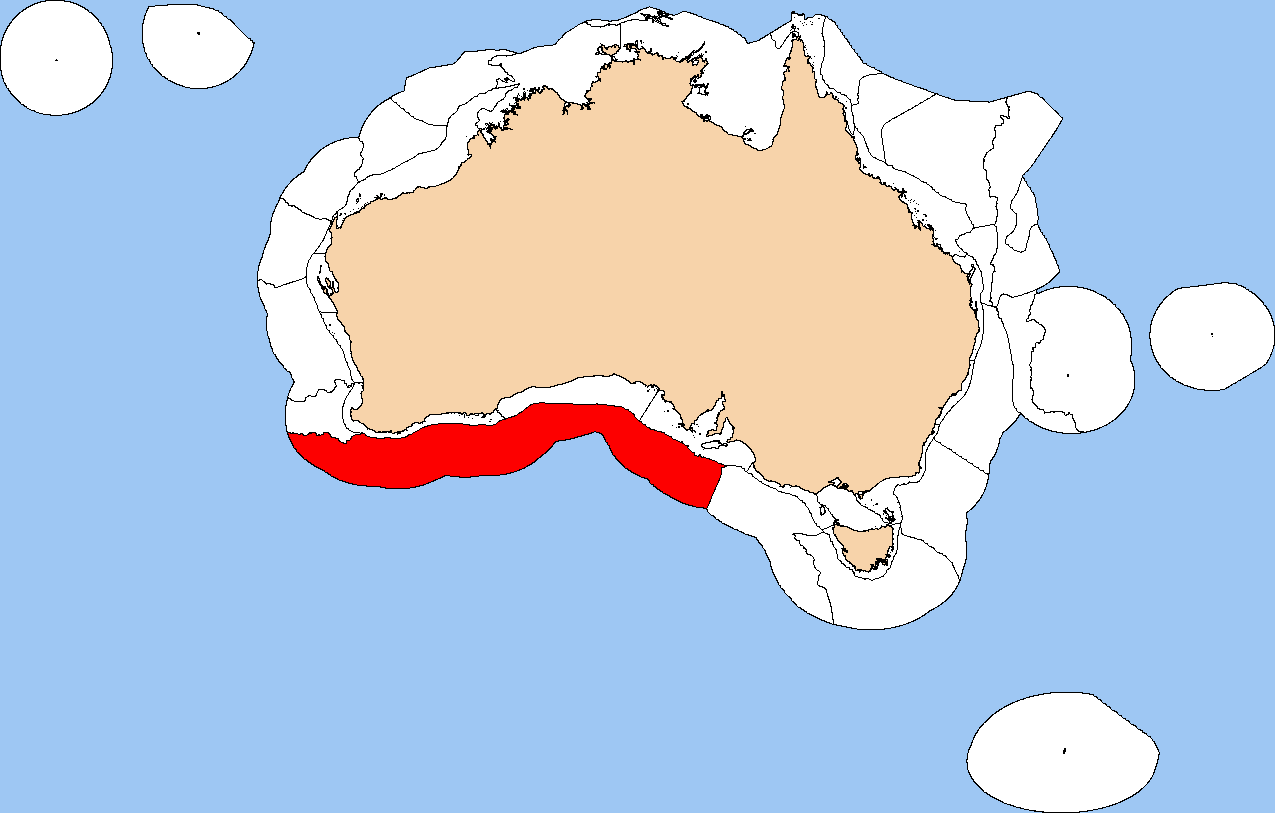
Southern Province

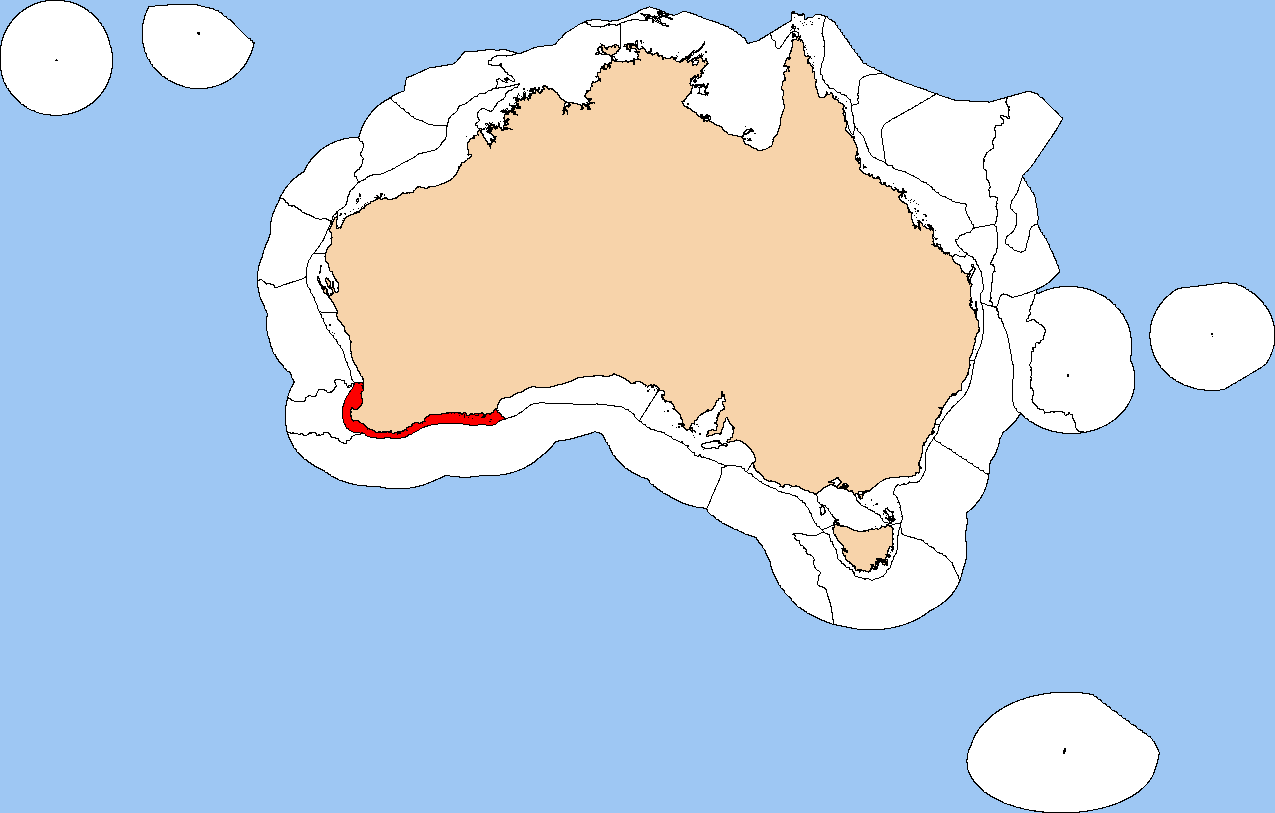
Southwest Shelf Province

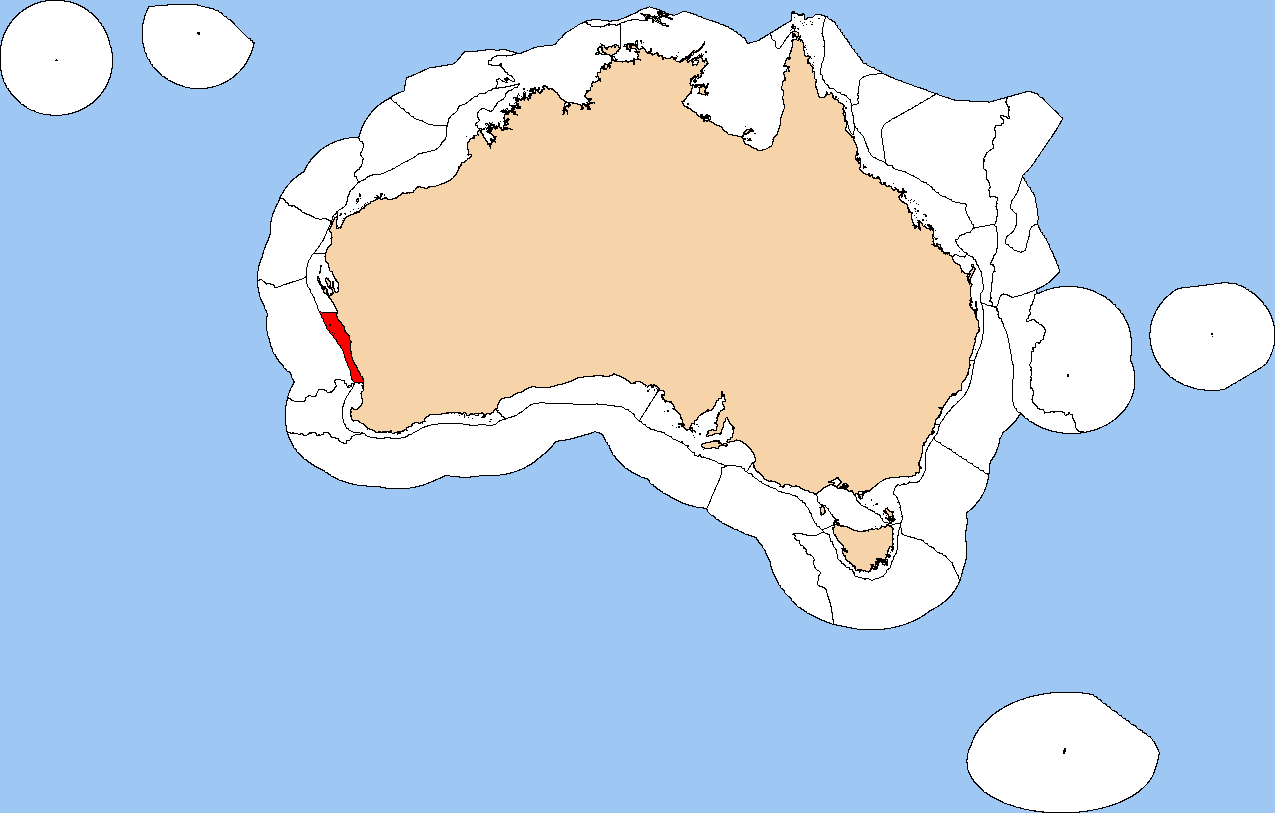
Southwest Shelf Transition

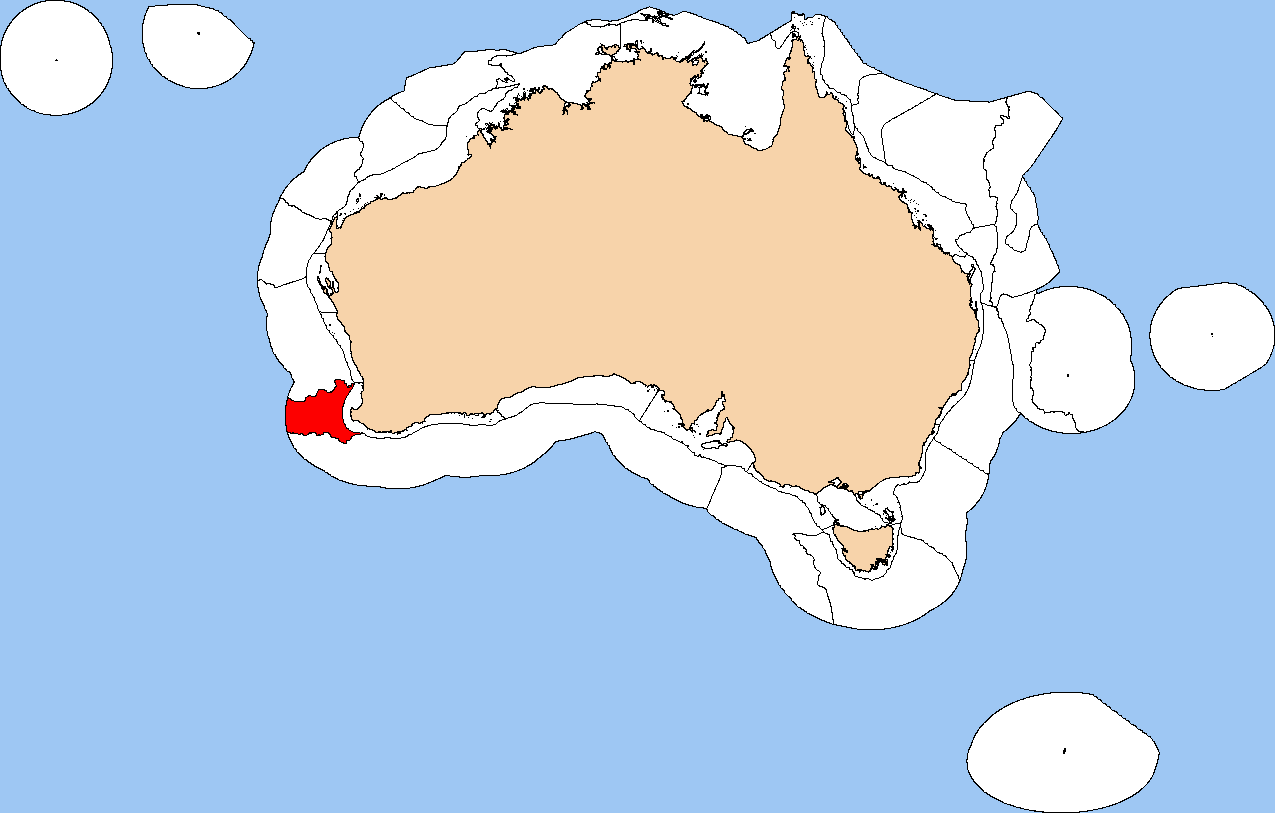
Southwest Transition

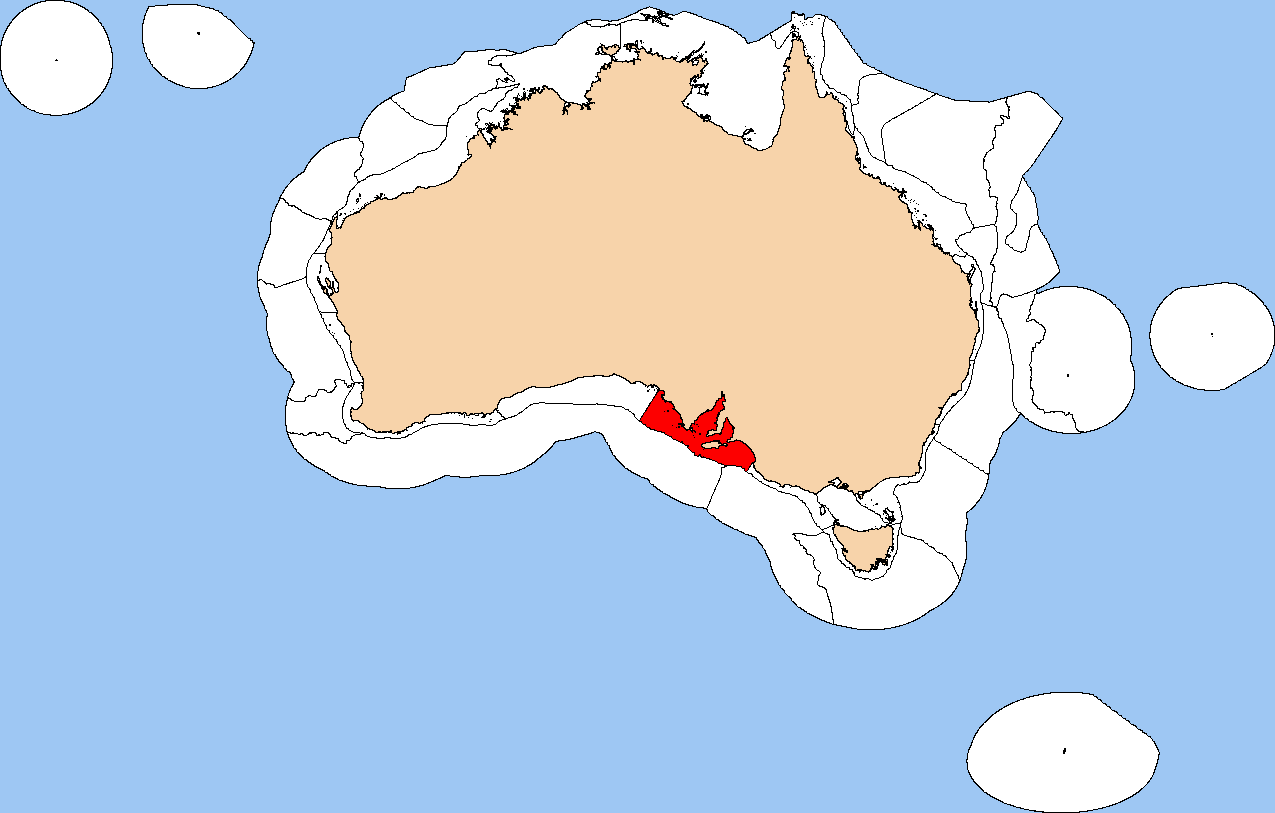
Spencer Gulf Shelf Province

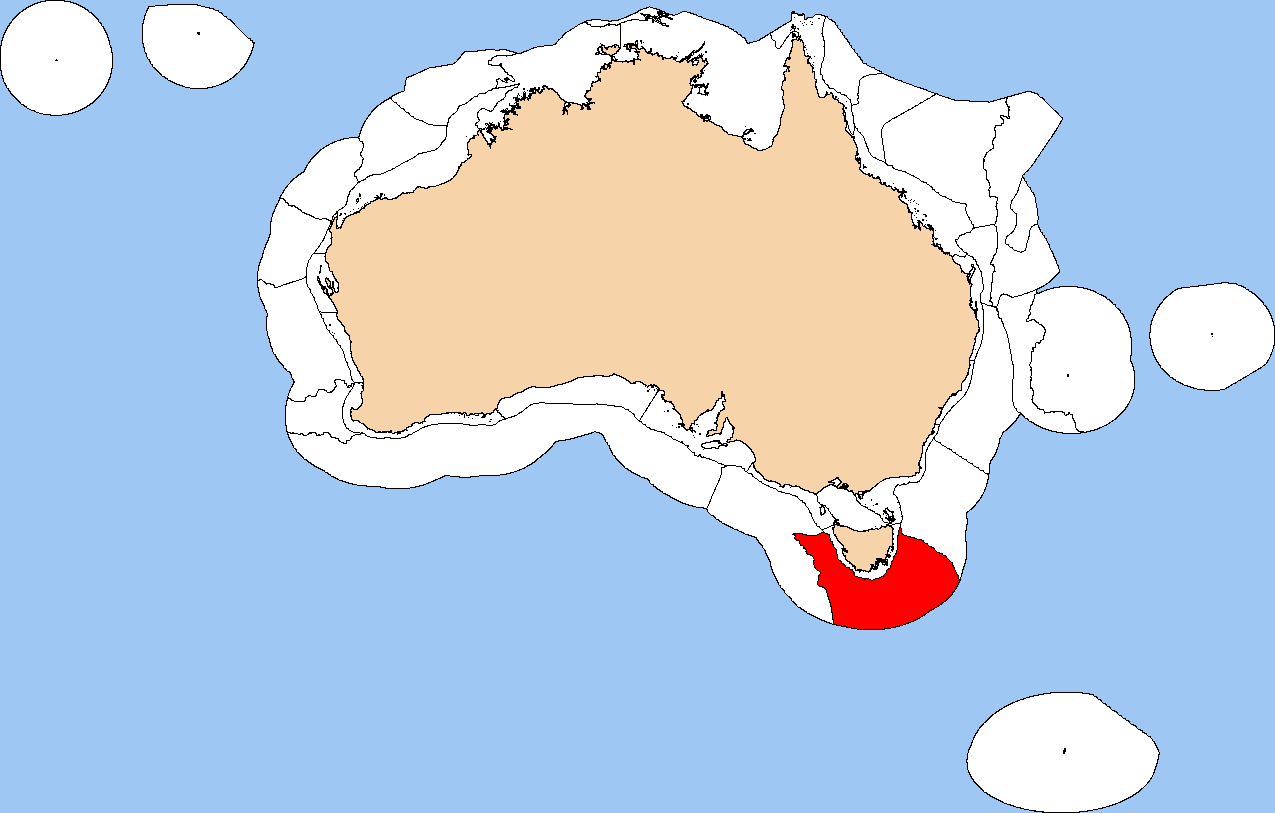
Tasmania Province

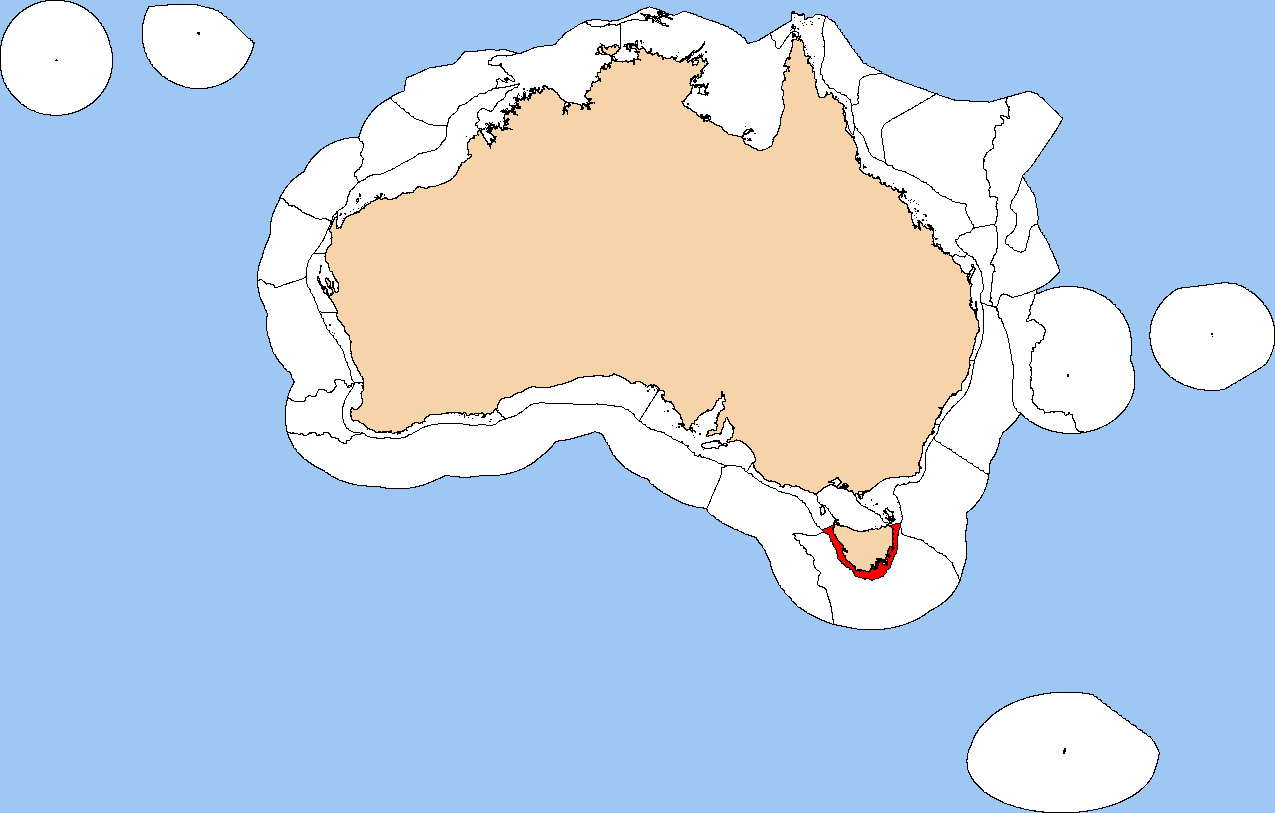
Tasmanian Shelf Province

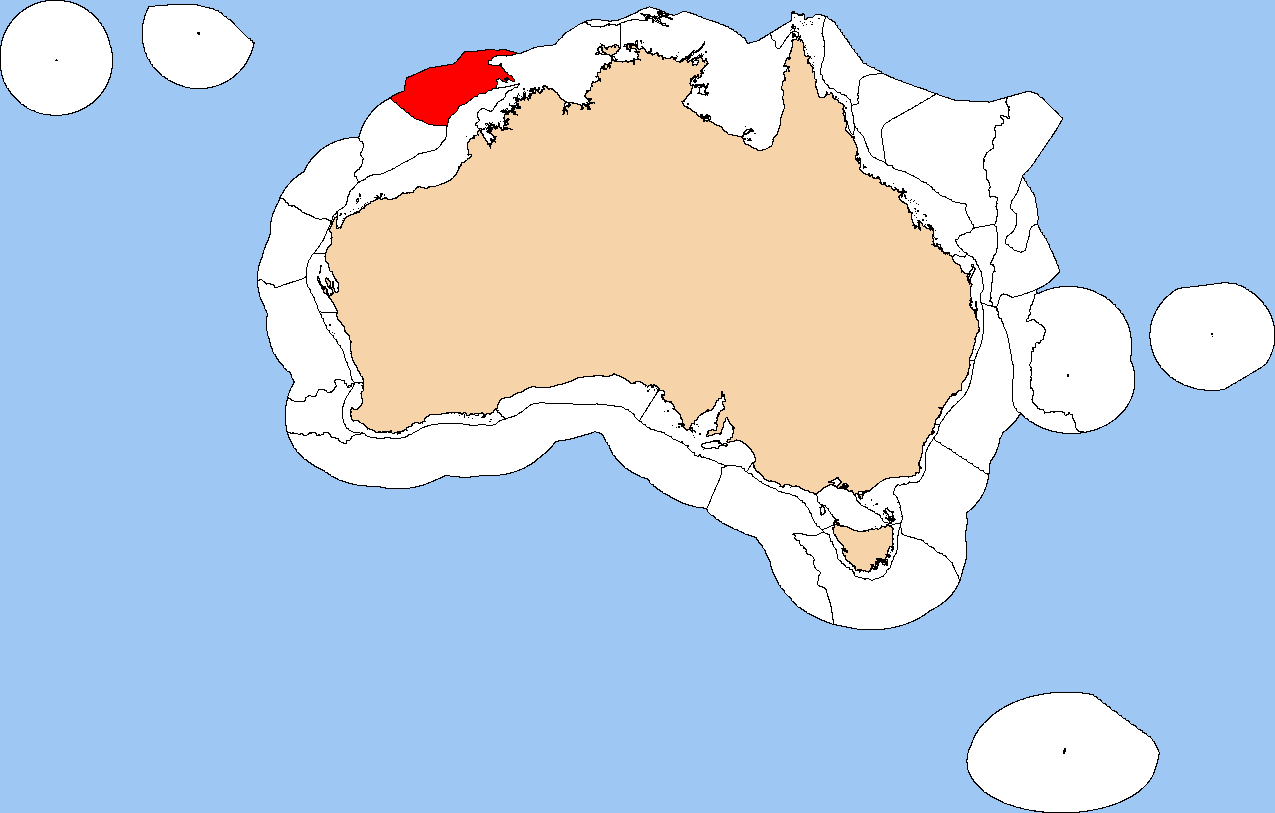
Timor Province

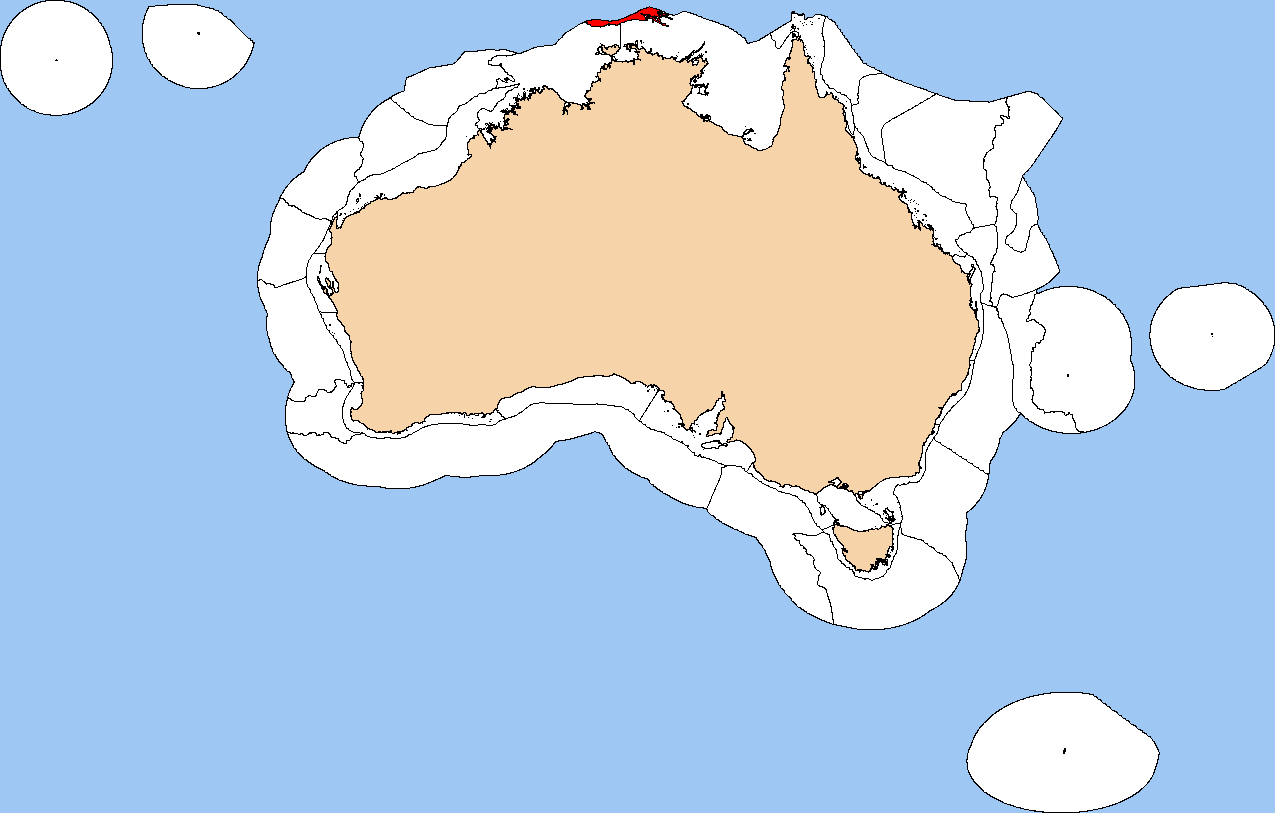
Timor Transition

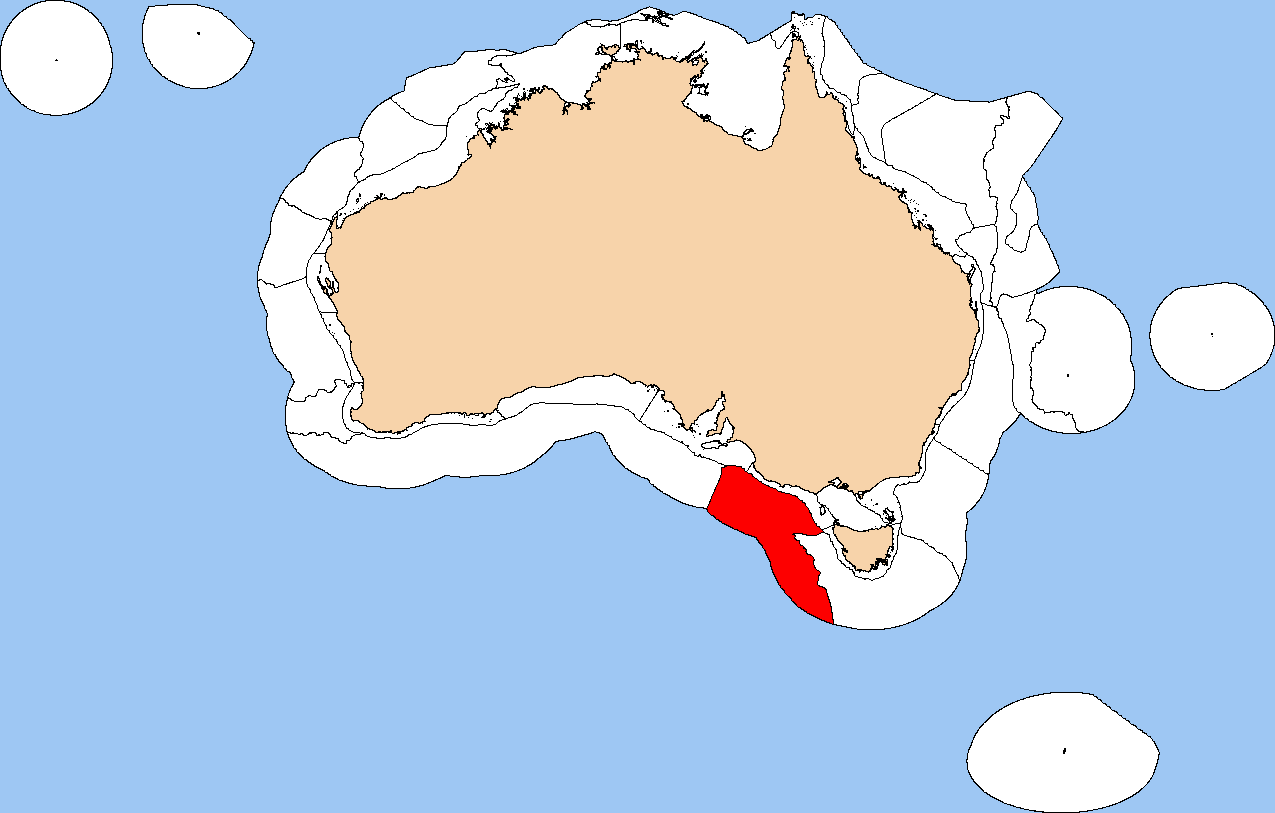
West Tasmania Transition

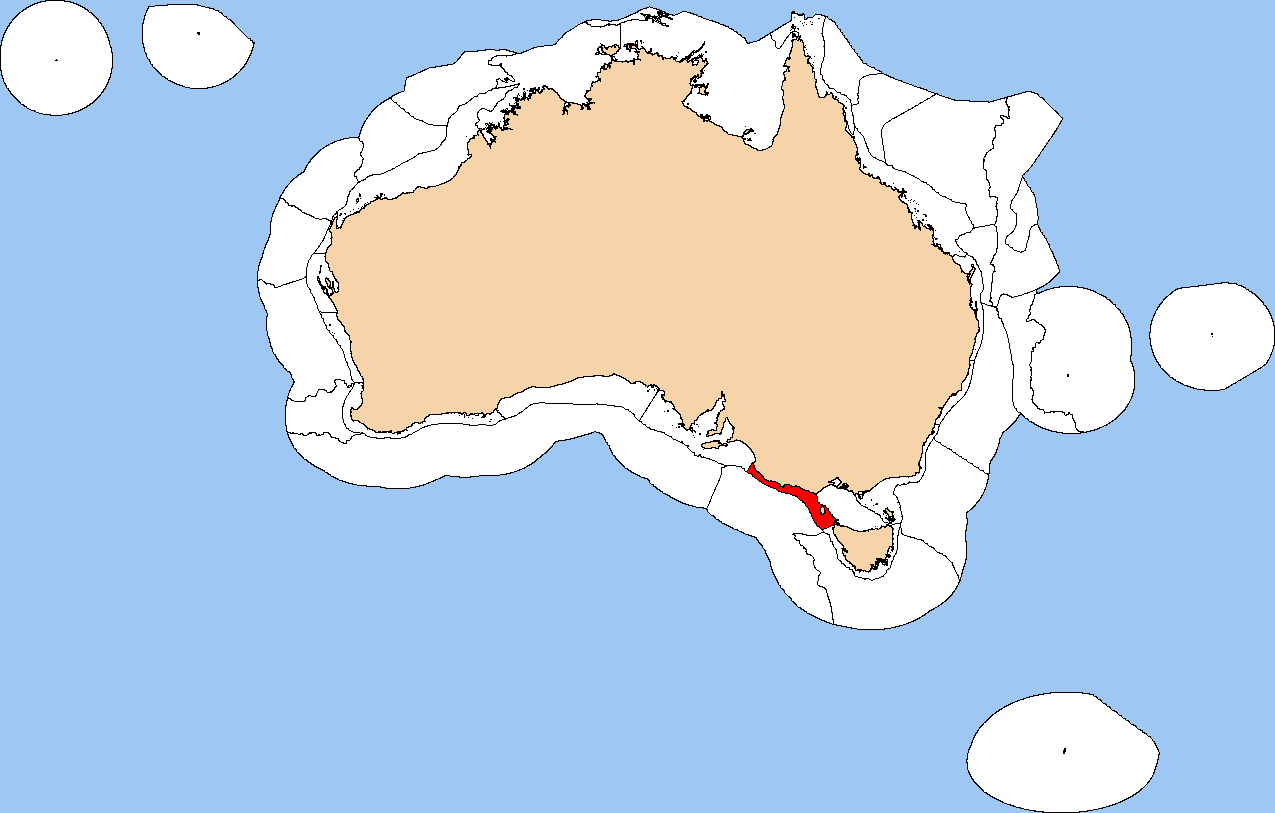
Western Bass Strait Shelf Transition

== List of Benthic meso-scale regions ==
- Abrolhos Islands (ABR)
- Anson Beagle (ANB)
- Arafura (ARA)
- Arnhem Wessel (AWS)
- Batemans Shelf (BAT)
- Boags (BGS)
- Bonaparte Gulf (BON)
- Bruny (BRU)
- Cambridge-Bonaparte (CAB)
- Canning (CAN)
- Carpentaria (CAR)
- Central Bass Strait (CBS)
- Cobourg (COB)
- Coorong (COR)
- Central Reef (CR)
- Central Victoria (CV)
- Central West Coast (CWC)
- Davey (DAV)
- East Cape York (ECY)
- Eighty Mile Beach (EMB)
- Eucla (EUC)
- Eyre (EYR)
- Flinders (FLI)
- Franklin (FRA)
- Freycinet (FRT)
- Groote (GRO)
- Hawkesbury Shelf (HAW)
- Karumba-Nassau (KAN)
- Kimberley (KIM)
- King Sound (KSD)
- Leeuwin-Naturaliste (LNE)
- Lucinda-Mackay Coast (LMC)
- Mackay-Capricorn (MC)
- Manning Shelf (MAN)
- Murat (MUR)
- Ningaloo (NIN)
- North Spencer Gulf (NSG)
- North West Shelf (NWS)
- Oceanic Shoals (OSS)
- Otway (OTW)
- Pellew (PEL)
- Pilbara (nearshore) (PIN)
- Pilbara (offshore) (PIO)
- Pompey-Swains (PS)
- Ribbons (RBN)
- Shark Bay (SBY)
- Shoalwater Coast (SC)
- Spencer Gulf (SG)
- St Vincent Gulf (SVG)
- Tiwi (TWI)
- Torres Strait (TS)
- Tweed-Moreton (TM)
- Twofold Shelf (TWO)
- Van Diemens Gulf (VDG)
- Victorian Embayments (VE)
- WA South Coast (WSC)
- West Cape York (WCY)
- Wellesley (WLY)
- Wet Tropic Coast (WTC)
- Zuytdorp (ZUY)

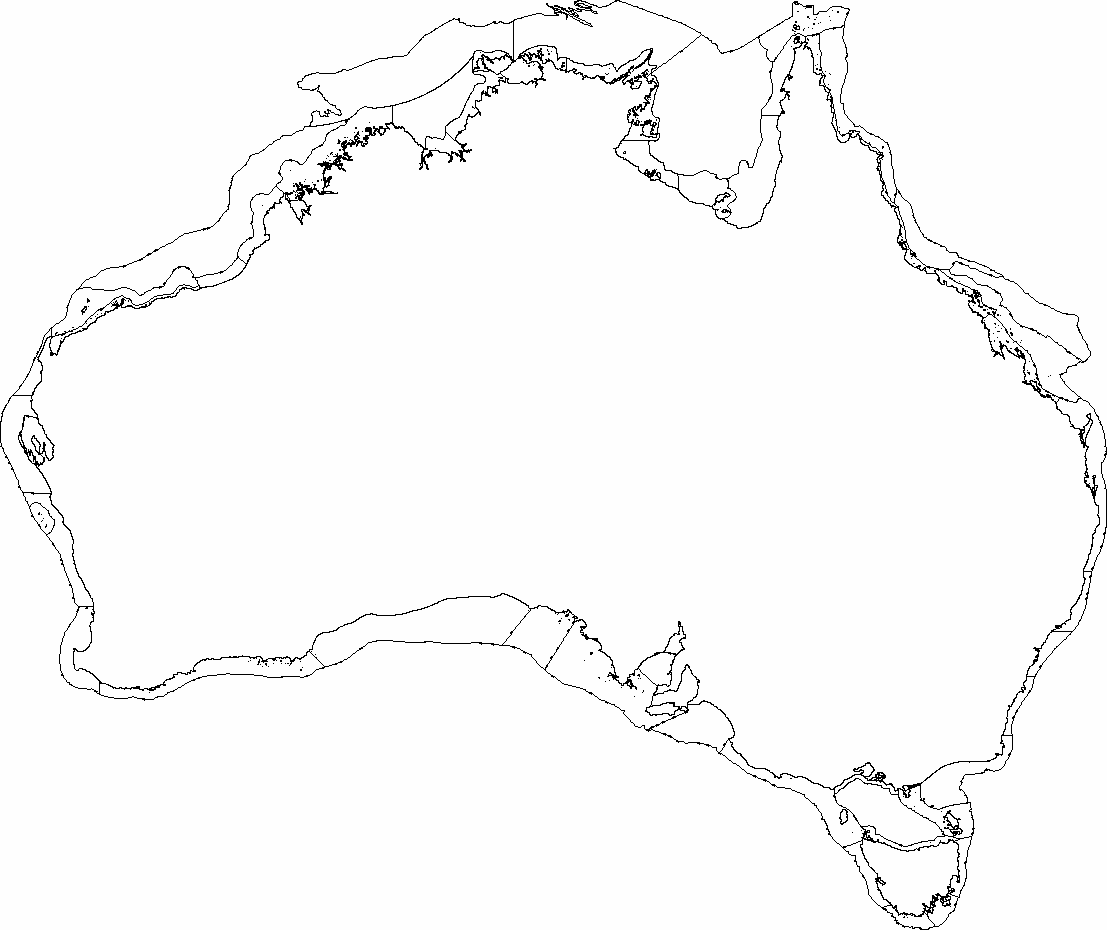
IMCRA 4.0 mesoscale bioregions

== Geomorphic units ==
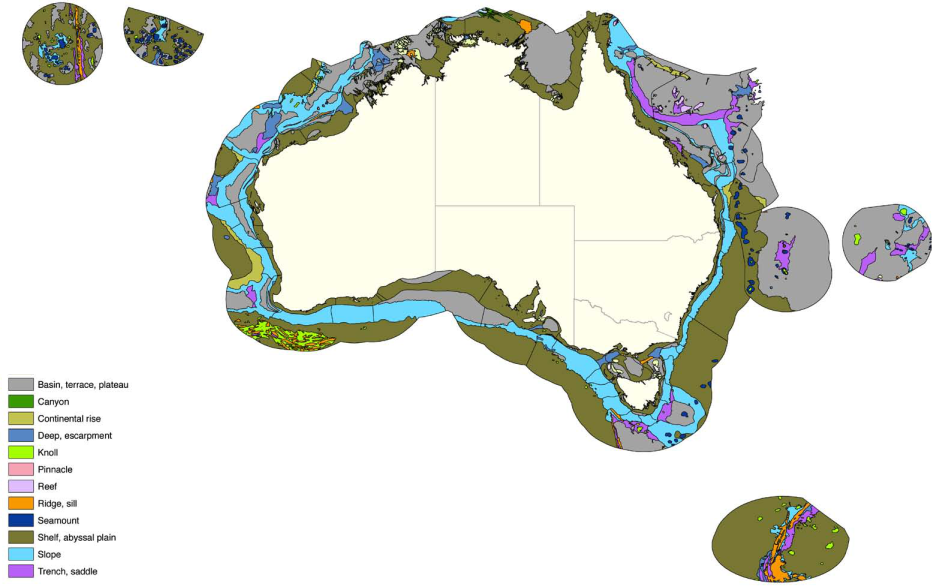
Map of geomorphic units of the ocean floor within the Australian EEZ

There are 1,334 separate geomorphic units in Australia’s waters, in 14 categories. The regions represent distinct areas of geomorphic features that have similar characteristics (e.g. areas of the continental slope that contain canyons, or flat plains).

Geomorphic features are determined by bathymetric models (depth analysis) of the ocean floor and provide an important predictor of species assemblages at a large scale. For example, different species will occur on low-gradient terraces compared to those on the steep-walled submarine canyons.

=== Categories ===
Nomenclature of geomorphic features are based on definitions endorsed by the International Hydrographic Organization (IHO, 2001).

- Apron:
  Gently dipping featureless surface, underlain primarily by sediment, at the base of any steeper slope.
- Bank, sandbank:
  Shallow water or submerged bank of sand in a sea or river that may be exposed at low tide
- Basin; terrace; plateau:
  Depression, characteristically in the deep sea floor, more or less equidimensional in plan and of variable extent;
  Relatively flat horizontal or gently inclined surface, sometimes long and narrow, which is bounded by a steeper ascending slope on one side and by a steeper descending slope on the opposite side;
  Flat or nearly flat area of considerable extent, dropping off abruptly on one or more sides.
- Canyon:
  A relatively narrow, deep depression with steep sides, the bottom of which generally has a continuous slope, developed characteristically on some continental slopes.
- Continental rise
- Deep; escarpment:
  Generally depths greater than 6,000 m; Elongated and comparatively steep slope separating or gently sloping areas.
- Knoll:
  Relatively small isolated elevation of a rounded shape.
- Pinnacle:
  High tower or spire-shaped pillar of rock or coral, alone or cresting a summit. It may extend above the surface of the water. It may or may not be a hazard to surface navigation
- Reef:
  Rock lying at or near the sea surface that may constitute a hazard to surface navigation
- Ridge; sill:
  (a) Long, narrow elevation with steep sides. (b) Long, narrow elevation often separating ocean basins. (c) Linked major mid-oceanic mountain systems of global extent;
  Sea floor barrier of relatively shallow depth restricting water movement between basins.
- Seamount:
  Large isolated elevation, greater than 1000 m in relief above the sea floor, characteristically of conical form.
- Shelf; abyssal plain:
  A gently sloping, flatter region adjacent to a continent (or around an island) or at abyssal depths.
- Slope:
  A sloped area seaward from the shelf edge to the upper edge of a continental rise or the point where there is a general reduction in slope.
- Trench; saddle:
  Long narrow, characteristically very deep and asymmetrical depression of the sea floor, with relatively steep sides;
  Broad pass, resembling in shape a riding saddle, in a ridge or between contiguous seamounts.

== See also ==
- Coastline of Australia
- Interim Biogeographic Regionalisation for Australia (IBRA)
