= List of marine ecoregions =

As defined by the WWF and The Nature Conservancy

The following is a list of marine ecoregions, as defined by the WWF and The Nature Conservancy

The WWF/Nature Conservancy scheme groups the individual ecoregions into 12 marine realms, which represent the broad latitudinal divisions of polar, temperate, and tropical seas, with subdivisions based on ocean basins. The marine realms are subdivided into 62 marine provinces, which include one or more of the 232 marine ecoregions.

The WWF/Nature Conservancy scheme currently encompasses only coastal and continental shelf areas. (Note: One classification of the deep oceans is PPOW: Spalding, Mark D.; Agostini, Vera N.; Rice, Jake; Grant, Susie M. (2012). "Pelagic provinces of the world: A biogeographic classification of the world's surface pelagic waters". Ocean & Coastal Management. 60: 19–30. Bibcode:2012OCM....60...19S. doi:10.1016/j.ocecoaman.2011.12.016.) (Note: Ocean-floor environments are examined in Watling, et al. 2013: Watling, Les; Guinotte, John; Clark, Malcolm R.; Smith, Craig R. (April 2013). "A proposed biogeography of the deep ocean floor" (PDF). Progress in Oceanography. 111: 91–112. Bibcode:2013PrOce.111...91W. doi:10.1016/j.pocean.2012.11.003.)

== Arctic realm ==
(no provinces identified)

- North Greenland
- North and East Iceland
- East Greenland Shelf
- West Greenland Shelf
- Northern Grand Banks-Southern Labrador
- Northern Labrador
- Baffin Bay-Davis Strait
- Hudson Complex
- Lancaster Sound
- High Arctic Archipelago
- Beaufort-Admunsen-Viscount Melville-Queen Maud
- Beaufort Sea-continental coast and shelf
- Chukchi Sea
- Eastern Bering Sea
- East Siberian Sea
- Laptev Sea
- Kara Sea
- North and East Barents Sea
- White Sea

== Temperate Northern Atlantic ==
=== Northern European Seas ===
- South and West Iceland
- Faroe Plateau
- Southern Norway
- Northern Norway and Finnmark
- Baltic Sea
- North Sea
- Celtic Seas

=== Lusitanian ===
- South European Atlantic Shelf
- Saharan Upwelling
- Azores Canaries Madeira

=== Mediterranean Sea ===
- Adriatic Sea
- Aegean Sea
- Levantine Sea
- Tunisian Plateau/Gulf of Sidra
- Ionian Sea
- Western Mediterranean
- Alboran Sea

=== Black Sea ===
- Black Sea

=== Cold Temperate Northwest Atlantic ===
- Gulf of St. Lawrence-Eastern Scotian Shelf
- Southern Grand Banks-South Newfoundland
- Scotian Shelf
- Gulf of Maine-Bay of Fundy
- Virginian

=== Warm Temperate Northwest Atlantic ===
- Carolinian
- Northern Gulf of Mexico

== Temperate Northern Pacific ==
=== Cold Temperate Northwest Pacific ===
- Sea of Okhotsk
- Kamchatka Shelf and Coast
- Oyashio Current
- Northern Honshu
- Sea of Japan
- Yellow Sea

=== Warm Temperate Northwest Pacific ===
- Central Kuroshio Current
- East China Sea

=== Cold Temperate Northeast Pacific ===
- Aleutian Islands
- Gulf of Alaska
- North American Pacific Fjordland
- Puget Trough/Georgia Basin
- Oregon, Washington, Vancouver Coast and Shelf
- Northern California

=== Warm Temperate Northeast Pacific ===
- Southern California Bight
- Cortezian
- Magdalena Transition

== Tropical Atlantic ==
=== Tropical Northwestern Atlantic ===
- Bermuda
- Bahamian
- Eastern Caribbean
- Greater Antilles
- Southwestern Caribbean
- Western Caribbean
- Southern Gulf of Mexico
- Floridian

=== North Brazil Shelf ===
- Guianian
- Amazonia

=== Tropical Southwestern Atlantic ===
- Sao Pedro and Sao Paulo Islands
- Fernando de Noronha and Atol das Rocas
- Northeastern Brazil
- Eastern Brazil
- Trindade and Martin Vaz Islands

=== St. Helena and Ascension Islands ===
- St. Helena and Ascension Islands

=== West African Transition ===
- Cape Verde
- Sahelian Upwelling

=== Gulf of Guinea ===
- Gulf of Guinea West
- Gulf of Guinea Upwelling
- Gulf of Guinea Central
- Gulf of Guinea Islands
- Gulf of Guinea South
- Angolan

== Western Indo-Pacific ==
=== Red Sea and Gulf of Aden ===
- Northern and Central Red Sea
- Southern Red Sea
- Gulf of Aden

=== Somali/Arabian ===
- Persian Gulf
- Gulf of Oman
- Western Arabian Sea
- Central Somali Coast

=== Western Indian Ocean ===
- Northern Monsoon Current Coast
- East African Coral Coast
- Seychelles
- Cargados Carajos
- Tromelin Island
- Mascarene Islands
- Southeast Madagascar
- Western and Northern Madagascar
- Bight of Sofala/Swamp Coast
- Delagoa

=== West and South Indian Shelf ===
- Western India
- South India and Sri Lanka

=== Central Indian Ocean Islands ===
- Maldives
- Chagos

=== Bay of Bengal ===
- Eastern India
- Northern Bay of Bengal

=== Andaman Sea ===
- Andaman and Nicobar Islands
- Andaman Sea Coral Coast
- Western Sumatra

== Central Indo-Pacific ==
=== South China Sea ===
- Gulf of Tonkin
- Southern China
- South China Sea Oceanic Islands

=== Sunda Shelf ===
- Gulf of Thailand
- Southern Vietnam
- Sunda Shelf/Java Sea
- Malacca Strait

=== Java Transitional ===
- Southern Java
- Cocos-Keeling/Christmas Island

=== South Kuroshio ===
- South Kuroshio

=== Tropical Northwestern Pacific ===
- Ogasawara Islands
- Mariana Islands
- East Caroline Islands
- West Caroline Islands

=== Western Coral Triangle ===
- Palawan/North Borneo
- Eastern Philippines
- Sulawesi Sea/Makassar Strait
- Halmahera
- Papua
- Banda Sea
- Lesser Sunda
- Northeast Sulawesi

=== Eastern Coral Triangle ===
- Bismarck Sea
- Solomon Archipelago
- Solomon Sea
- Southeast Papua New Guinea

=== Sahul Shelf ===
- Gulf of Papua
- Arafura Sea
- Arnhem Coast to Gulf of Carpentaria
- Bonaparte Coast

=== Northeast Australian Shelf ===
- Torres Strait and Northern Great Barrier Reef
- Central and Southern Great Barrier Reef

=== Northwest Australian Shelf ===
- Exmouth to Broome
- Ningaloo

=== Tropical Southwestern Pacific ===
- Tonga Islands
- Fiji Islands
- Vanuatu
- New Caledonia
- Coral Sea

=== Lord Howe and Norfolk Islands ===
- Lord Howe and Norfolk Islands

== Eastern Indo-Pacific ==
=== Hawaii ===
- Hawaii

=== Marshall, Gilbert, and Ellice Islands ===
- Marshall Islands
- Gilbert and Ellice Islands

=== Central Polynesia ===
- Line Islands
- Phoenix Islands/Tokelau/Northern Cook Islands
- Samoa Islands

=== Southeast Polynesia ===
- Tuamotus
- Rapa-Pitcairn
- Southern Cook/Austral Islands
- Society Islands

=== Marquesas ===
- Marquesas

=== Easter Island ===
- Easter Island

== Tropical Eastern Pacific ==
=== Tropical East Pacific ===
- Revillagigedos
- Clipperton
- Mexican Tropical Pacific
- Chiapas-Nicaragua
- Nicoya
- Cocos Islands
- Panama Bight
- Guayaquil

=== Galapagos ===
- Northern Galapagos Islands
- Eastern Galapagos Islands
- Western Galapagos Islands

== Temperate South America ==
=== Warm Temperate Southeastern Pacific ===
- Central Peru
- Humboldtian
- Central Chile
- Araucanian

=== Juan Fernandez and Desventuradas ===
- Juan Fernandez and Desventuradas

=== Warm Temperate Southwestern Atlantic ===
- Southeastern Brazil
- Rio Grande
- Rio de la Plata
- Uruguay-Buenos Aires Shelf

=== Magellanic ===
- North Patagonian Gulfs
- Patagonian Shelf
- Falkland Islands
- Channels and Fjords of Southern Chile
- Chiloense

=== Tristan-Gough ===
- Tristan-Gough

== Temperate Southern Africa ==
=== Benguela ===
- Namib
- Namaqua

=== Agulhas ===
- Agulhas Bank
- Natal

=== Amsterdam-St Paul ===
- Amsterdam-Saint-Paul

== Temperate Australasia ==
=== Northern New Zealand ===
- Kermadec Islands (195)
- Northeastern New Zealand (196)
- Three Kings-North Cape (197)

=== Southern New Zealand ===
- Chatham Island (198)
- Central New Zealand (199)
- South New Zealand (200)
- Snares Island (201)

=== East Central Australian Shelf ===
- Tweed-Moreton (202)
- Manning-Hawkesbury (203)

=== Southeast Australian Shelf ===
- Cape Howe (204)
- Bassian (205)
- Western Bassian (206)

=== Southwest Australian Shelf ===
- South Australian Gulfs (207)
- Great Australian Bight (208)
- Leeuwin (209)

=== Western Central Australian Shelf ===
- Shark Bay (210)
- Houtman (211)

== Southern Ocean ==
=== Subantarctic Islands ===
- Macquarie Island
- Heard Island and McDonald Islands
- Kerguelen Islands
- Crozet Islands
- Prince Edward Islands
- Bouvet Island
- Peter the First Island

=== Scotia Sea ===
- South Sandwich Islands
- South Georgia
- South Orkney Islands
- South Shetland Islands
- Antarctic Peninsula

=== Continental High Antarctic ===
- East Antarctic Wilkes Land
- East Antarctic Enderby Land
- East Antarctic Dronning Maud Land
- Weddell Sea
- Amundsen/Bellingshausen Sea
- Ross Sea

=== Subantarctic New Zealand ===
- Bounty and Antipodes Islands
- Campbell Island
- Auckland Island

== See also ==
- List of terrestrial ecoregions (WWF)
