= Temperate Australasia =

Biogeographic regional waters of Australia and New Zealand

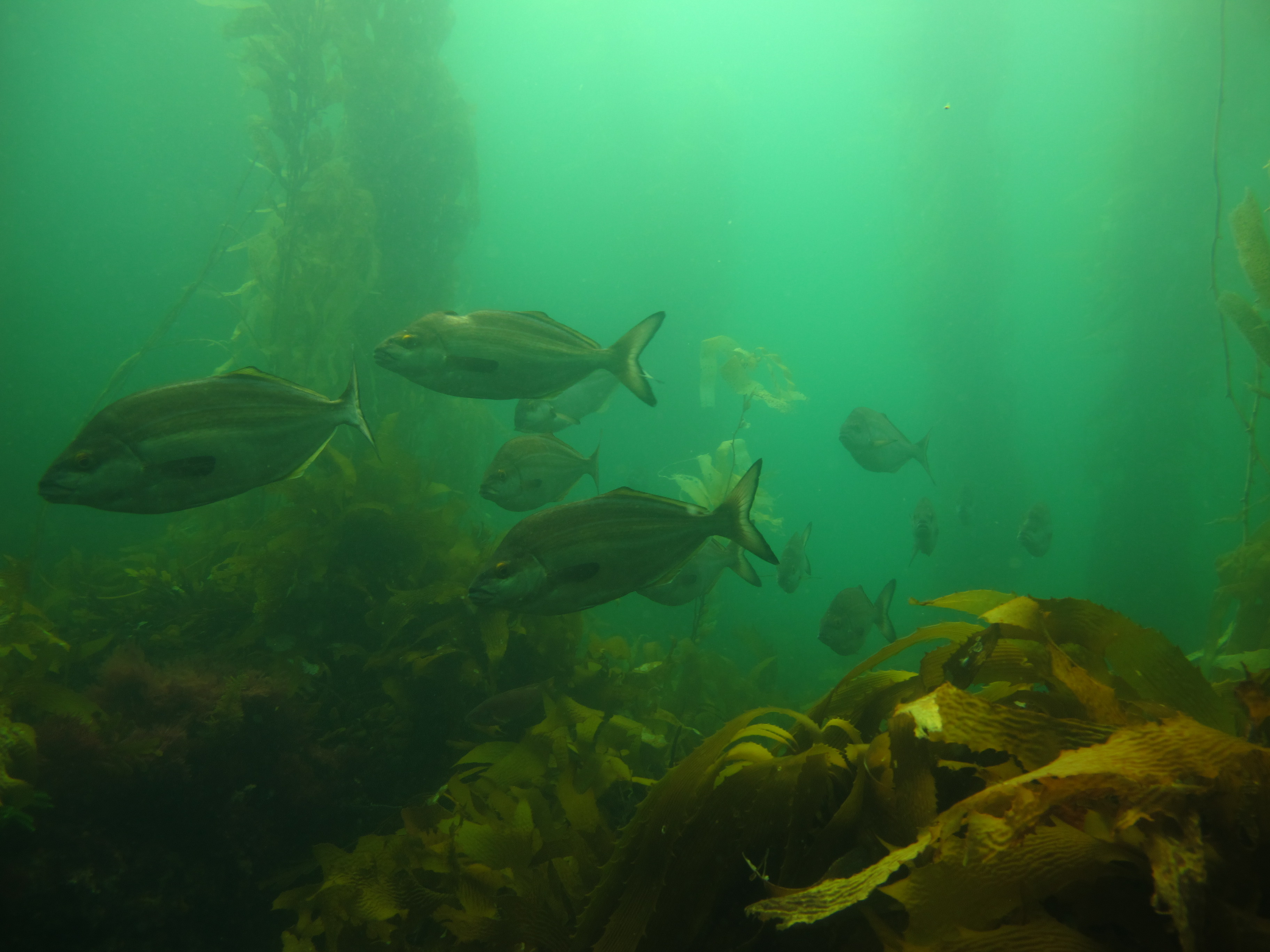
Kelp forest off the coast of Tasmania, Australia

Temperate Australasia is a biogeographic region of the Earth's seas, comprising the temperate and subtropical waters of Australia and New Zealand, including both the Indian Ocean and Pacific coasts of the continent and adjacent islands. It is a marine realm, one of the great biogeographic divisions of the world's oceans.

Temperate Australasia encompasses the western, southern, and southeastern coasts of Australia, and Tasmania. The tropical waters of northern Australia are part of the Central Indo-Pacific marine realm. Temperate Australasia includes New Zealand's North and South Islands, the Kermadec Islands, Chatham Island, and Snares Island. The rest of New Zealand's subantarctic islands are part of the Southern Ocean realm.

== Reefs ==
In large parts of the realm along the southern coast of continental Australia, a network of rocky reefs and kelp forests has created a unique biodiversity hotspot known popularly as the Great Southern Reef.

== Subdivisions ==
The Temperate Australasia realm is divided into five marine provinces. The provinces are divided into marine ecoregions.

- Northern New Zealand province
  - Kermadec Islands
  - Northeastern New Zealand
  - Three Kings-North Cape
- Southern New Zealand province
  - Chatham Island
  - Central New Zealand
  - South New Zealand
  - Snares Island
- East Central Australian Shelf province
  - Tweed-Moreton
  - Manning-Hawkesbury
- Southeast Australian Shelf province
  - Cape Howe
  - Bassian
  - Western Bassian
- Southwest Australian Shelf province
  - South Australian Gulfs (207)
  - Great Australian Bight (208)
  - Leeuwin (209)
- Western Central Australian Shelf province
  - Shark Bay
  - Houtman
