= Bass Strait Shelf Province =

Marine bioregion in Southern Australia

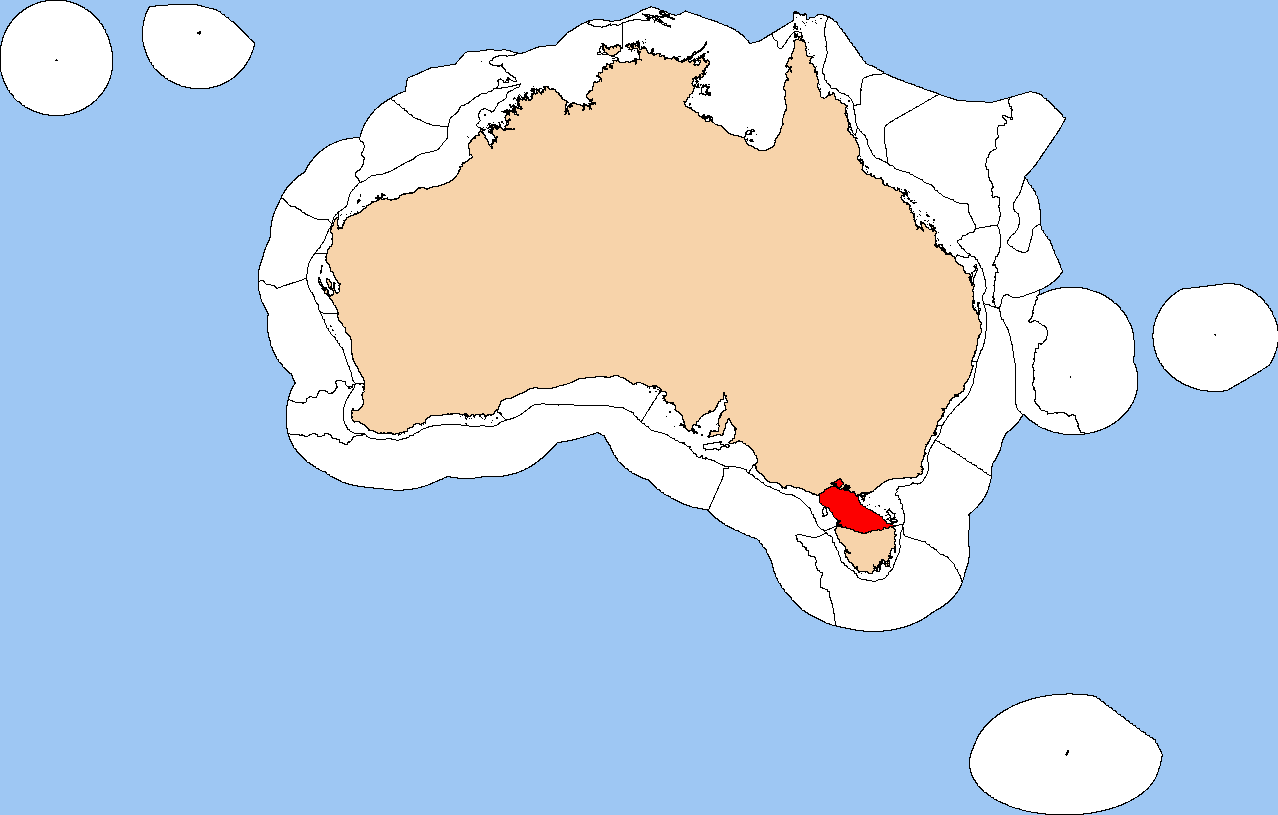
Map of the Bass Strait Shelf Province

The Bass Strait Shelf Province is a biogeographic region of Australia's coastal and continental shelf waters. It covers the central Bass Strait between Tasmania and the southern Australian mainland. It is a provincial level bioregion in the Integrated Marine and Coastal Regionalisation of Australia (IMCRA) system. The Bassian and adjacent Tasmanian Shelf provinces correspond to the Bassian marine ecoregion in the WWF's Marine Ecoregions of the World system.

== Geography ==
The Bass Strait Shelf Province covers the central Bass Strait, and the adjacent coasts of Tasmania and Victoria. On the Victorian Coast it extends from east of Cape Otway to Waratah Bay. It also includes the northern Tasmanian coast, from the northwestern tip of the island near Kangaroo Island to Little Musselroe Bay, east of Cape Portland at the northeastern tip. On the west it excludes King Island, which belongs to the adjacent Western Bass Strait Shelf Transition bioregion, and to the east it excludes the Furneaux Group of islands, which belong to the adjacent Southeast Shelf Transition bioregion.

== Ecology ==
The province is characterised by a small group of endemic species confined to Bass Strait and adjacent transitions. It is home to warm temperate species from the Central Eastern Shelf Province and Southwest Shelf Province, cool temperate species from the Tasmanian Shelf Province, and widespread southern temperate species. The bioregional endemics are a focus of national biodiversity conservation efforts.

== Meso-scale bioregions ==
The province contains four meso-scale bioregions:

- Victorian Embayments (VE)
- Central Victoria (CV)
- Central Bass Strait (CBS)
- Boags (BGS)
