= Bassian =

Bassian may refer to:

- Saint Bassian (c. 320 – c. 409), Italian saint
- Bassian thrush, a bird of Australia and Tasmania
- Bassian ecoregion, a marine ecoregion
- Bassian Patrikeyev, Russian ecclesiastic and political figure and writer
- Bassian rings, in Algebra.
