= Tasmanian Shelf Province =

Marine bioregion in Southern Australia

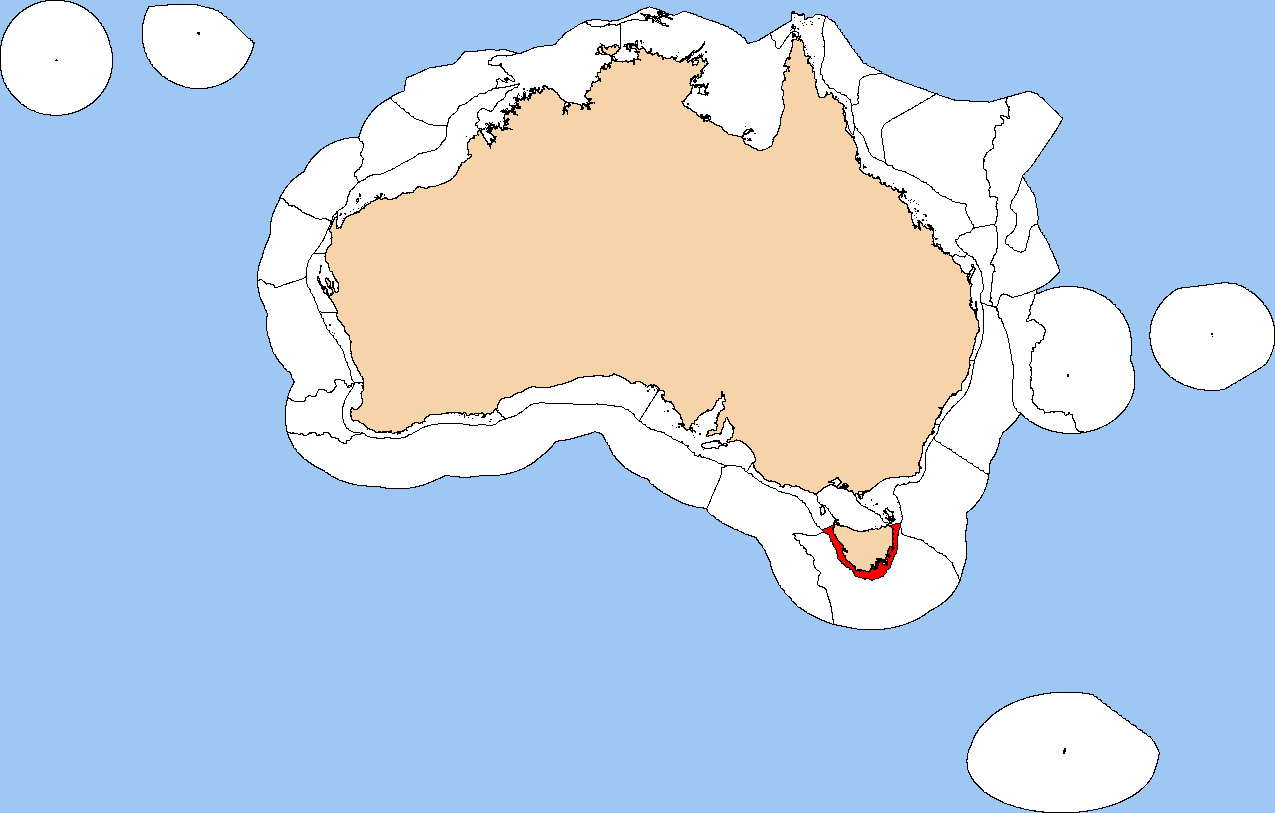
Map of the Tasmanian Shelf Province

The Tasmanian Shelf Province is a biogeographic region of Tasmania's coastal and continental shelf waters. It covers the western, eastern, and southern coasts of Tasmania. It is a provincial level bioregion in the Integrated Marine and Coastal Regionalisation of Australia (IMCRA) system. The Tasmanian Shelf and adjacent Bass Strait Shelf provinces correspond to the Bassian marine ecoregion in the WWF's Marine Ecoregions of the World system.

== Geography ==
The Tasmanian Shelf Province includes the cold-temperate waters that encircle the east, west, and south coasts of Tasmania, from Cape Grim at the north-western tip of the island to Cape Naturaliste at the north-eastern tip. In the northwest it adjoins the Western Bass Strait Shelf Transition bioregion, and the Bass Strait Shelf Province and Southeast Shelf Transition on the northeast.

The Tasmanian Shelf and Bass Strait Shelf provinces are both cold-temperate provinces. The Southeast Shelf and Western Bass Strait transitions are biotone regions between the cool temperate provinces and the warm-temperate provinces to the northwest and northeast.

=== Meso-scale bioregions ===
The province contains four meso-scale bioregions:

- Franklin (FRA)
- Davey (DAV)
- Bruny (BRU)
- Freycinet (FRT)

== Ecology ==
The biota is characterized by cool-temperate species, most of which also range westwards into the Western Bass Strait Shelf Transition and Spencer Gulf Shelf Province, and north to the Bass Strait Shelf Province and as far as Cape Howe in the Southeast Shelf Transition. In the summer months species from the Southeast Shelf Transition migrate southwards along the east coast of Tasmania.
