= Bassian ecoregion =

Marine ecoregion in Southern Australia

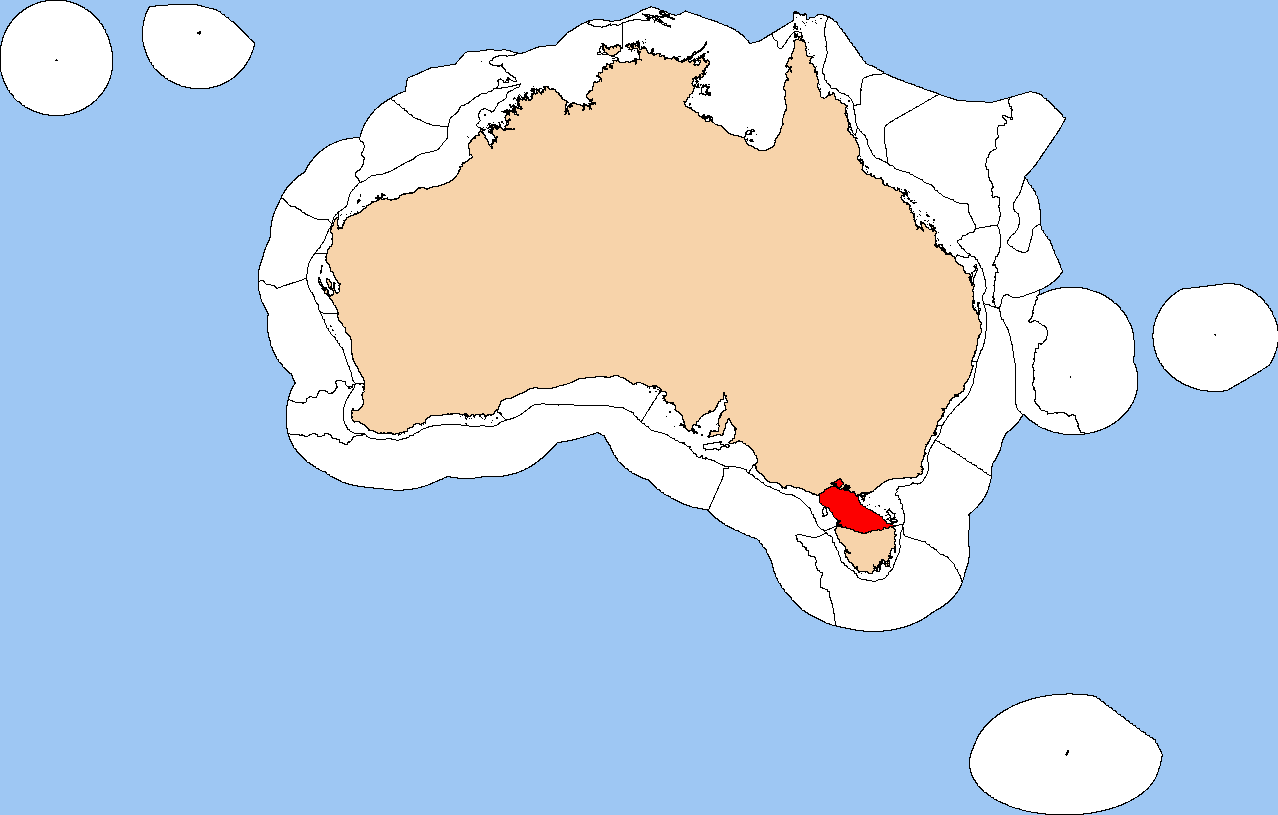
Map of the Bass Strait Shelf Province

The Bassian ecoregion is a biogeographic region of Australia's coastal and continental shelf waters. It includes the cold-temperate waters surrounding Tasmania, including the central Bass Strait between Tasmania and the southern Australian mainland. This ecoregion, designated in the Marine Ecoregions of the World system by the World Wildlife Fund (WWF), includes both the Bass Strait Shelf and Tasmanian Shelf provincial level bioregions from the Integrated Marine and Coastal Regionalisation of Australia (IMCRA) system.

== Geography ==
The Bassian ecoregion extends around Tasmania, and across the central Bass Strait to the central coast of Victoria on the Australian mainland. On the southeast, south, and southwest it extends to the edge of the continental shelf. On the Victorian Coast it extends from east of Cape Otway to Waratah Bay. It excludes King Island and the western end of the Bass Strait, which belongs to the adjacent Western Bassian ecoregion, and to the east it excludes the Furneaux Group of islands and the eastern end of the Bass Strait, which belong to the adjacent Cape Howe ecoregion. The Otway and Cape Howe ecoregions are transitions between the cold-temperate Bassian ecoregion and warm-temperate regions further to the northwest and northeast.

== Ecology ==
The province is characterised by cold temperate species which also dwell in the adjacent transitions. It also is home to warm temperate species from the Central Eastern Shelf Province and Southwest Shelf Province, and widespread southern temperate species. The bioregional endemics are a focus of national biodiversity conservation efforts.
