= Cape Byron Marine Park =

Marine park in New South Wales, Australia

Coordinates: 28.68°S 153.68°E

Cape Byron Marine Park is one of four marine parks in New South Wales, Australia, and is the most recently sanctioned. The Cape Byron Marine Park is located in Northern NSW and extends 37 kilometres (23 mi) from the Brunswick River to Lennox Head. The marine park extends out to 3 nautical miles (5.6 km; 3.5 mi) which dictates the border between state and federal jurisdiction. The marine park covers an area of 220 square kilometres (85 sq mi) and includes a variety of marine terrain including beaches, rocky shores, open ocean and the tidal waters of the Brunswick River and its tributaries, the Belongil Creek and Tallow Creek. The Cape Byron Marine Park was declared in 2002 and the zoning plan was implemented in April 2006. Of the 15 distinct marine ecosystems identified within the Tweed-Moreton bioregion, the Cape Byron Marine Park supports 10 of these.

The Cape Byron Marine Park caters to both commercial and recreational uses including fishing, swimming, diving, walking, and other beach activities.

== Ecology ==
Cape Byron Marine Park is situated in Northern New South Wales which experiences a sub-tropical climate. The monthly average sea temperature fluctuates between 27.1 degrees in February and 21.6 degrees in July. The Cape Byron Marine Park is also impacted by the East Australian Current (EAC), which transports warm water currents into temperate zones. The presence of the EAC plays an important role in transporting tropical flora and fauna into Southern Hemisphere temperate zones. The Cape Byron Marine Park is located on the Eastern Overlap Zone where warm waters form the north converge with cooler waters from the south. The local marine habitats include exposed and sheltered sandy beaches, rocky shores, rocky reefs, submerged pinnacles, small rocky islands, coral communities, riverine estuaries, coastal creeks and lakes, and sandy seabed habitats. The major ecosystems in the Cape Byron Marine Park are estuaries, rocky shores and platforms, sub tidal reefs and emergent rocks and islands, sandy beaches, and open oceans.

- Estuaries are located where freshwater creeks and rivers meet the sea. There are three estuaries in the Cape Byron Marine Park which are of two basic types - mature barrier estuaries (Brunswick River) and saline lagoons and coastal creeks (Belongil Creek and Tallow Creek).
- Rocky shores and platforms are found at various sites within the Cape Byron Marine Park, including Lennox Head, Broken Head and Cape Byron. The notable rocky shores/platforms are the moat at Lennox head, the intertidal boulder foreshore at Lennox Point, the flat rock around Broken Head.
- Subtidal reefs and emergent rocks and islands are found throughout the Cape Byron Marine Park. The major subtidal reefs and emergent rocks and islands are the Cocked Hat Rocks (inshore emergent rocks and islands), Julian Rocks (offshore emergent rocks and islands), Middle Reef and Wilsons Reef (inshore shallow reefs), Mackerel Boulder- Spot X and Cape Pinnacle (offshore shallow reef) and the Deep Reef within the marine park.
- Sandy beach habitats are made up of intertidal beach and surf zones. The beaches within the Cape Byron Marine Park include: Tyagarah Beach, Belongil Beach, Main Beach, Clarks Beach, Tallow Beach, Seven Mile Beach, Wategos, Little Wategos, Kings, Brays and Whites Beaches.
- Subtidal soft substrate of the Cape Byron Marine Park consist of muddy, sandy and gravelly seafloors.
- Open oceans play an important role in the local marine environment due to the impact of ocean currents, temperatures and productivity which influences food source availability and habitat.

== Flora ==
The Cape Byron Marine Park is home to several species of flora which play a significant role in the local ecosystems by being a source of food, habitat, breeding grounds for the local marine animals and bird life. The flora also plays a role in improving water quality and the filtering of sediments which create a more hospital and liveable environment for the local marine life. The significant species within the Cape Byron Marine Park include mangroves, seagrasses, kelp, saltmarshes and algae.

The mangroves found in the Cape Byron include the grey mangrove (Avicennia marina), river mangrove (Aegiceras corniculatum), the orange mangrove (Bruguiera gymnorhiza) and the milky mangrove (Excoecaria agallocha).

The seagrass found in the estuaries, Zostera capricorni, is an important habitat for many fish and crustaceans including dugongs and green turtles. They play a crucial role the nutrient and carbon cycle as well as trap sediment and filter coastal water. These process are vital to the local ecosystem. The tropical seagrass Halodule uninervis is also found in the marine park particularly around the "moat".

Kelp is a form of subtidal microalgae that forms on the surface of mid water in temperate regions. Kelp plays its part as a form of habitat and is inhabited by a diverse range of marine animals and sea weeds. Kelp is a form of protect and foods source of many local animals and its existent is reliant on the existence of predators which ensure the impact of degradation based on herbivorous animals.

The salt marsh that is found within the Cape Byron Marine Park is the marine couch (Sporobolus virginicus var. minor) and the maritime rush (Juncus krausii).

Algae is also found in the marine park, and in particular sargassum, the rare red algae (Rodriguezella), and the brown algae (Ecklonia radiata).

== Fauna ==
The marine life of the Cape Byron Marine Park includes many species of dolphins, sharks, rays, turtles, eels, starfish, and corals fish, seabirds and marine plants. The Brunswick River is also home to several varieties of marine life including colourful nudibranchs (sea slugs), sea snails, shrimps, crabs, corals, starfish, anemones, octopus, flatworms, sea squirts and sponges.

=== Fish ===
The Cape Byron Marine Park has more than 530 recorded fish species. However, there are several species which are in decline and or threatened which are protected under the Fisheries Management Act 1994. These include the Bleeker's devil fish (Paraplesiops bleekeri), estuary cod (Epinephelus coioides), threatened black cod (Epinephelus daemelii) and the giant Queensland grouper (Epinephelus lanceolatus). The spotted wobbegong (Orectolobus maculatus) and banded wobbegong (Orectolobus ornatus) have been recorded to be in decline while the great white shark (Carcharhinus carcharias) has been listed as vulnerable under the Fisheries Management Act 1994. The grey nurse shark (Carcharius taurus) has also been listed under the Fisheries Management Act 1994 (NSW DPI 1994) as an endangered species and defined by the Environment Protection and Biodiversity Act 1999 as critically endangered with fears that there are less than 500 remaining in NSW waters.

=== Mammals ===
The Cape Byron Marine Park is also a part-time home to the humpback whale (Megaptera novaeangliae) which uses the Cape Byron Marine Park on their migratory journey from the Southern Ocean to their tropical breeding grounds.

=== Reptiles ===
Three of the sea turtles that live within the Cape Byron Marine Park which are considered threatened under the Threatened Species Conservation Act 1995 are the loggerhead turtle (Caretta caretta) which is defined as endangered and the green turtle (Chelonia mydas) and the leatherback turtle (Dermochelys coriacea) which are both defined as vulnerable. These turtles are also considered threatened under the Environment Protection and Biodiversity Conservation Act 1999 along with the hawksbill turtle (Eretmochelys imbricate) and the flatback turtle (Natator depressus).

=== Birds ===
The Cape Bryon Marine Park plays an important role for many birds by providing habitat, breeding grounds, food source and hunting grounds, as well seasonal movements for migratory species. The NSW Threatened Species Conservation Act 1995 identifies the migratory little tern (Sterna albifrons) and the beach stone-curlew (Esacus neglectus) as endangered. Seabirds that utilize the Cape Byron Marine Park are the providence petrel (Pterodroma solandri), flesh-footed shearwater (Puffinus carneipes), and the masked booby (Sula dactylatra) which are protected under the National Parks and Wildlife Act 1974.

=== Invertebrates ===
Although no invertebrates have been identified as endangered or vulnerable, it is important to acknowledge that there are a plethora of them within the Cape Byron Marine Park which are critical to the health of the local ecosystems. These include a variety of molluscs such as the gold ring cowries (Cypraea annulus), crustaceans such as the zebra shrimp (Ganthophylum americanum) and the seven armed sea star (Luidia australiae). These invertebrates have been noted as they are not usually found in areas and climates such as the Cape Byron Marine Park. The zebra shrimp and the seven armed sea star are rarely found in intertidal habitats and the gold ring cowries share a tropical affinity and demonstrate a rare occurrence in which the Cape Byron Marine Park is a habitat for both temperate and tropical species.

== Environmental threats and issues ==
There are several ongoing threats to the Cape Byron Marine Park and its biodiversity. These environmental threats and issues include tourism and recreational use, fishing, pollution, development, invasive species, disease and climate change. The current trend of ocean temperature increases impacts the local habitat conditions, species range, and the impact of the EAC. Tourism and recreational use of the Cape Byron Marine Park has impacted on the populations of grey nurse sharks (Carcharias taurus). Grey nurse sharks maintain the same nursery breeding grounds which are often disturbed by tourism activities such as divers and often the use of shark repellent. Shark netting protected swimmers on beaches has also been linked to mortality of grey nurse sharks. Increased boat traffic, pollution and fishing equipment are also a threat to the humpback whale on their migratory journey.

Recreational fishing which is permitted in the Cape Byron Marine Park has also been linked to mortality rates of grey nurse sharks. It has been reported that the injuries sustained by grey nurse sharks in the form of jaw injuries and internal fishing hook, which can cause disease or internal injuries which has increased the long term mortality rates. Considering that over 30% of grey nurse sharks reported have fishing related injuries, this is a significant impact on an endangered species.

The local sea turtle population, including the green turtle and loggerhead turtle, are currently at risk of fibropapillomatosis and in particular a new corneal strand of the virus which has resulted in a declining population. The increased prevalence of this virus has been linked to environmental factors such spikes in seasonal water temperatures and harmful algae bloom. The rise of cyanobacteria in the Cape Byron Marine Park is also linked with the increase of pollution. Coastal development around the Cape Byron Marine Park is a concern on the nesting areas of the migratory little tern. Little terns are highly sensitive to human disturbance and a decrease in suitable habitat impacts on the population size due to a decrease in adequate roosting and breeding grounds. Little terns are also impacted by pollution as poor water quality is known to negatively affect their food intake capacity. Coastal developments have also been known to impact on the local saltmarsh and mangrove communities which are critical habitat for several species of marine life and birdlife.

Climate change is affecting the Cape Byron Marine Park in several ways. It is altering the species range shifts which can impact finely balanced ecosystems. Examples of this has been seen through the identification of several tropical species identified within the Cape Byron Marine Park. There is also direct link between the rising levels of CO_{2} in the atmosphere, the oceans become warmer and the lowering of the ocean's pH levels (ocean acidification). An increase in acidification and warmer water leads to a decrease in carbonates which are attributed to coral bleaching as mass bleaching occurs when sea temperatures have exceeded average temperatures by 1 degree for more than several weeks. This will impact negatively on the rare back coral trees (Antipathes grandis) found within the Cape Byron Marine Park. Changes in water temperature that are associated with climate change are also expected to impacted on the life cycle of many species as evidenced by the loggerhead turtle (Caretta caretta) change in nesting patterns and times, this again could lead to an unbalanced ecosystem which could have detrimental effects on other species which rely on the loggerhead turtle for survival.

== Management ==
The NSW marine parks have been declared under the Marine Parks Act 1997 and are managed by NSW Department of Primary Industries staff. The act aims to protect and conserve the biodiversity of the marine park whilst also allowing for sustainable resource use e.g. fishing, whilst also allowing for reaction and public use of the area. The Marine Parks Act created the Marine Parks Authority which has the responsibility for administering the act, a statewide Marine Parks Advisory Council that provides advice to the ministers responsible for marine parks on matters relevant to all marine parks, and local advisory committees that advise the ministers on local marine park matters. The act also provides for the preparation of zoning plans; establishment of closures; assessment of development activities, both within and affecting marine parks; and preparation of operational plans. The Cape Byron Marine Park is divided into zones such as the; sanctuary zones, habitat protection zones, general use zones, and special purpose zones and they are managed accordingly.

Aside from the Marine Parks Act 1997, Cape Byron Marine Park is also affected by the Environment Protection and Biodiversity Act 1999, NSW Threatened Species Conservation Act 1995, National Parks and Wildlife Act 1974. These acts impact on the area as they cover several species that are protected under these acts such as the grey nurse shark.

The Cape Byron Marine Park is impacted by a range of programs, including those operating within the park including: fisheries management, pollution reduction, estuary and coastal management. There are also programs on a national level that affect the marine park such as catchment management, national park management and land-use planning associated with the marine park. The Marine Parks Authority has a role in influencing the programs and initiatives that it is not directly responsible for and attempting to work in collaboration to achieve common goals. The Marine Park Authority works with other governmental departments including the Department of Planning, local government and with the Australian Department of the Environment, Water, Heritage and the Arts.
