= Great Southern Reef =

Australian reef system

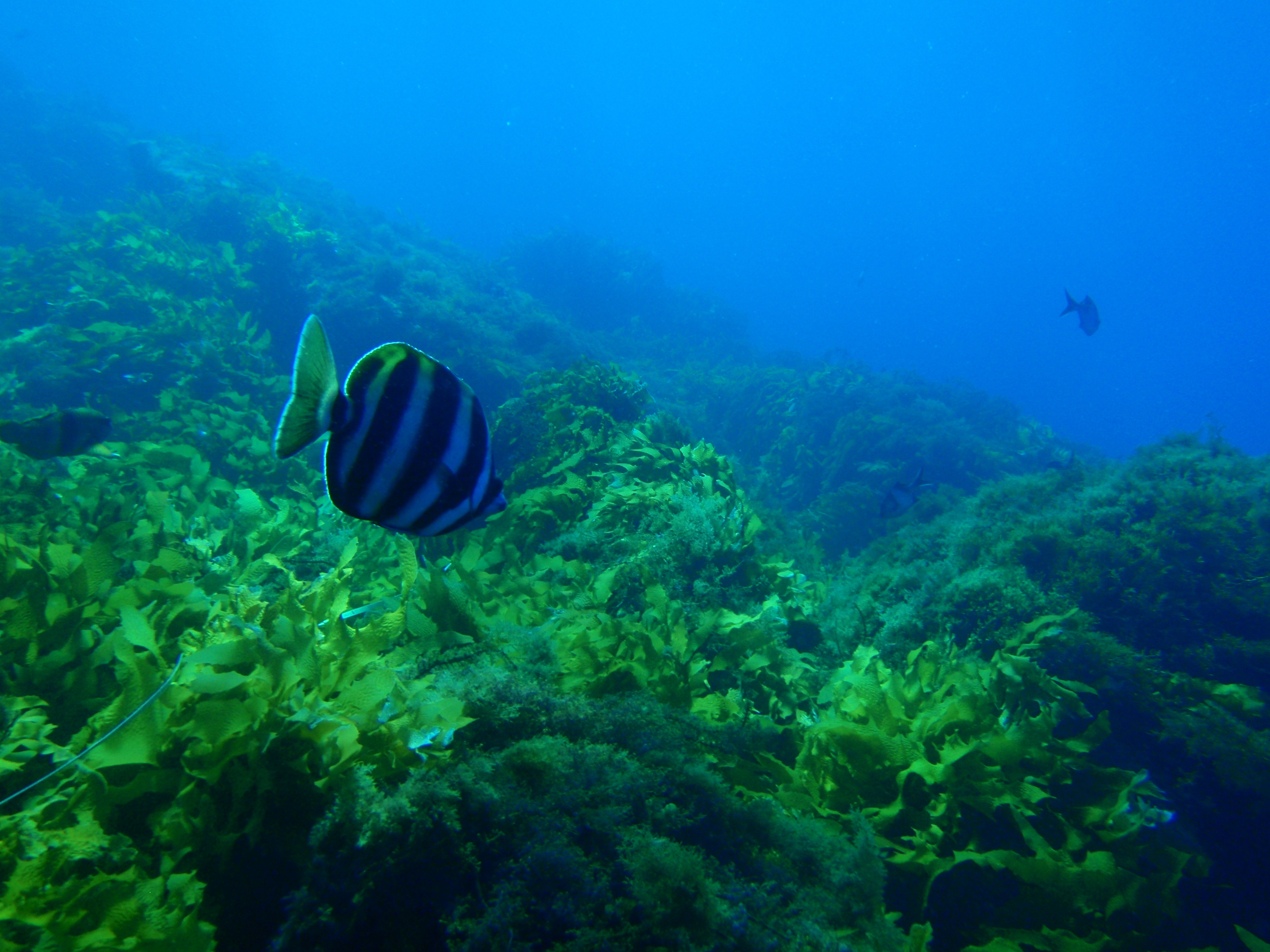
- An endemic sixbar coralfish (Tilodon sexfasciatus) explores the golden kelp at Greenly Island, South Australia

Ecology
- Realm: Temperate Australasia
- Biome: Kelp forest, rocky reef
- Animals: Leafy seadragon, fairy penguin, Australian sea lion

Geography
- Area: 71,000 km^{2} (27,000 mi^{2})
- Country: Australia
- States: Western Australia, South Australia, Victoria, NSW, Tasmania
- Coordinates: 35°00′14″S 135°57′37″E
- Climate type: Temperate

The Great Southern Reef is a system of interconnected reefs that spans the southern coast of continental Australia and Tasmania and extends as far north as Brisbane to the east and Kalbarri to the west. It covers 71,000 km^{2} (27,000 sq mi) of ocean and straddles five states, running along the coast for 8,000 km (5,000 mi).

The Great Southern Reef is named after its world-famous neighbour to the north, the Great Barrier Reef, but has received a fraction of the attention and protection given to the latter. The Great Southern Reef is an important biodiversity hotspot and annually contributes more than AU$10 billion to the Australian economy. The Australian rock lobster and abalone fisheries, together worth four times the value of all commercial fishing in the Great Barrier Reef, operate within the Great Southern Reef. The robust health of the reef can be attributed to its cool, oxygen-rich waters and sprawling forests of giant and golden kelp. The kelp provides food and shelter for thousands of species, and its endemic species include all three known species of seadragon, one of the world's smallest species of penguin, and Australia's only endemic pinniped.

The Aboriginal people of Australia and Tasmania developed and practiced sustainable management of the Great Southern Reef's abundant resources for thousands of years before Western colonisation. Modern scientific research on the ecology of the Great Southern Reef before 2015 was scant, and it continues to receive very little attention or resources compared to other marine ecosystems of similar ecological value. An estimated 10,000 species remain to be discovered. Giving the Great Southern Reef its name was part of an ongoing and concerted effort to raise the public's awareness of its existence, importance, and plight. Thanks to its location on the Indo-Australian tectonic plate, the reef has enjoyed stable environmental conditions for most of its history, but human-caused threats like anthropogenic climate change, overfishing, and marine animal invasions have caused significant damage to its unique habitats, including kelp die-offs and disruptions to the food web. The cooler waters that support the biodiversity of the Great Southern Reef make it and its highly specialised inhabitants especially vulnerable to the effects of climate change.

== Etymology ==
The name first appeared in Australian news media in September 2015, a few months after the term was coined in an unprecedented scientific study of the reef published in the journal Marine and Freshwater Research. It derives from the reef's location on the southern coast of Australia and its proximity to the better-known Great Barrier Reef to the north. Advocates for protection of the Great Southern Reef came up with the name to help spread awareness of its existence and importance.

== Geography and geology ==
The Great Southern Reef is divided between the Indian Ocean to the west, the Southern Ocean to the south, and the South Pacific Ocean to the east. The Great Australian Bight, the bay that makes up most of the south coast of continental Australia, and the Tasman Sea between Australia and New Zealand represent significant portions of the reef.

The rocky reefs that make up the Great Southern Reef are the result of weathering and erosion on the continent; some may have originally been landforms before sea levels rose. Wave action deposits sand on the reef and carves away at the rock, creating a variety of habitats for animals. These features are typically made of granite and sandstone, but soft limestone forms part of the coastline. Geologists believe that the reef's location has been one of the factors that has created such a rich ecosystem and high levels of endemism: Southern Australia is generally stable and free of disruptions caused by tectonic activity, has no glaciers that could cause isostatic movement, and has a dry climate, meaning less sediment is swept into rivers and carried to the coast.

Currents play an important role to the ecology of the Great Southern Reef (GSR). Both the Leeuwin and East Australian Currents bring warm water to the temperate coastline, along with transporting larvae, propagules, plants and fungi that help contribute to a thriving habitat composed of tens of thousands of species within the GSR. This number does not include species that have yet to be discovered.

== Flora and fauna ==
=== Plants ===
While the Great Barrier Reef is made up of tropical coral reefs, the Great Southern Reef is located in a temperate marine ecosystem with reefs made of rock. A defining feature of the Great Southern Reef, kelp forests provide the primary production, habitat, and other resources needed for the high level of biodiversity in the region, which is home to thousands of species; hundreds of those are found nowhere else, and an estimated 10,000 remain to be discovered. In addition to giant kelp, golden kelp is common on the Great Southern Reef. Kelp forests are also some of the world's largest carbon sinks, and the Great Southern Reef therefore acts as a buffer against climate change. Unfortunately, an estimated 95% of the giant kelp forests off the coast of Tasmania have died off over the past few decades due higher water temperatures and the long-spined sea urchin.

=== Kelp ===
One of the most important biological assets to the GSR are the Ecklonia radiata (Golden Kelp), producing biomass at up to 65 tonnes of biomass per hectare per year. The kelp forests help feed the majority of the costal ecosystems that support the diverse marine life. Kelp forests in general are important to the ecology, Wernberg compares them to trees on land and explains that they are referred to as kelp forests. Not only do kelp forests provide a rich habitat for marine life, but humans have also had a relationship with it for food and tools.

In addition to macroalgae, sessile animals like soft corals, sea fans and other gorgonians, and colourful sponge gardens create habitats for fish and invertebrates.

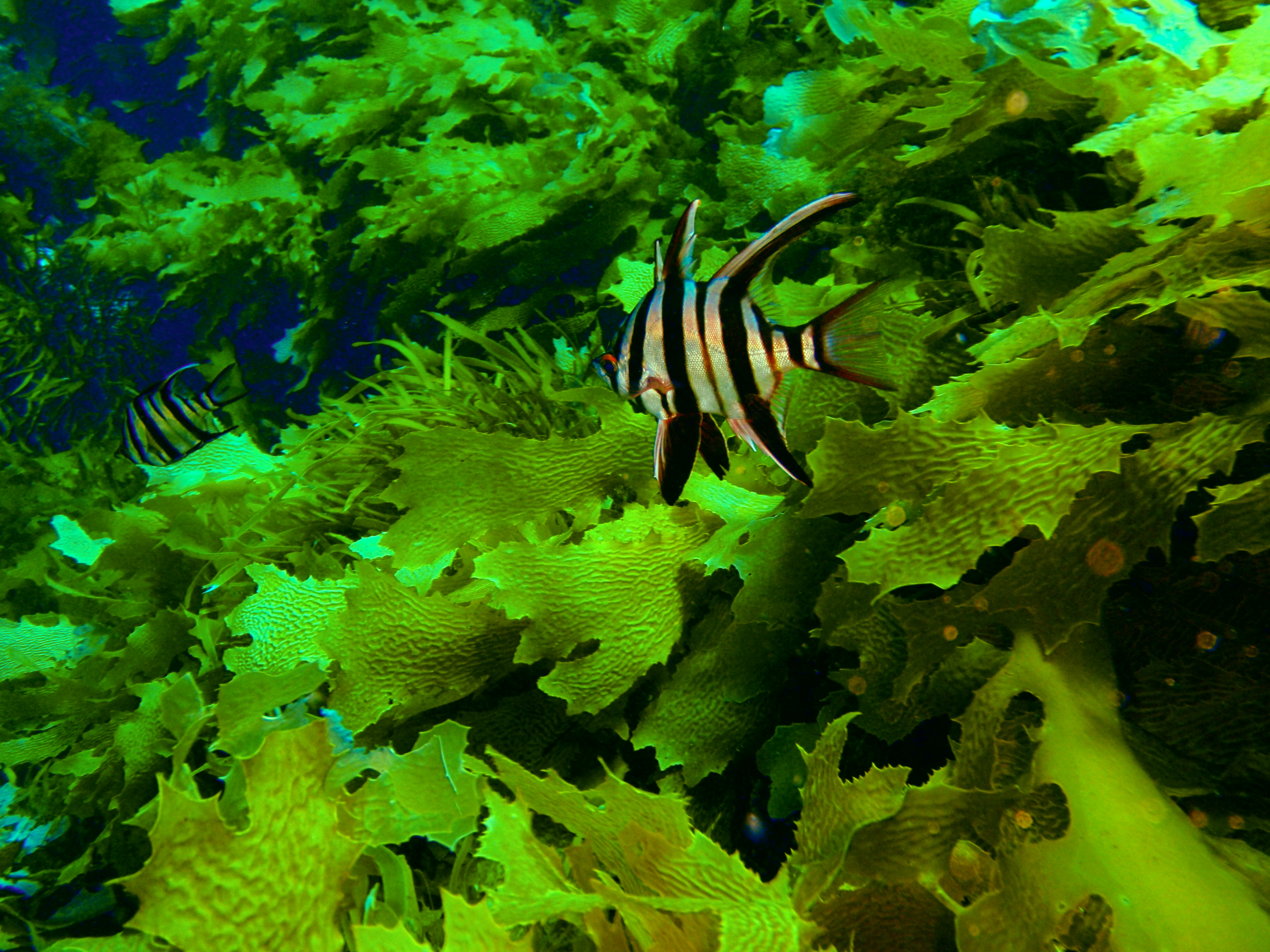
Old wives (Enoplosus armatus)

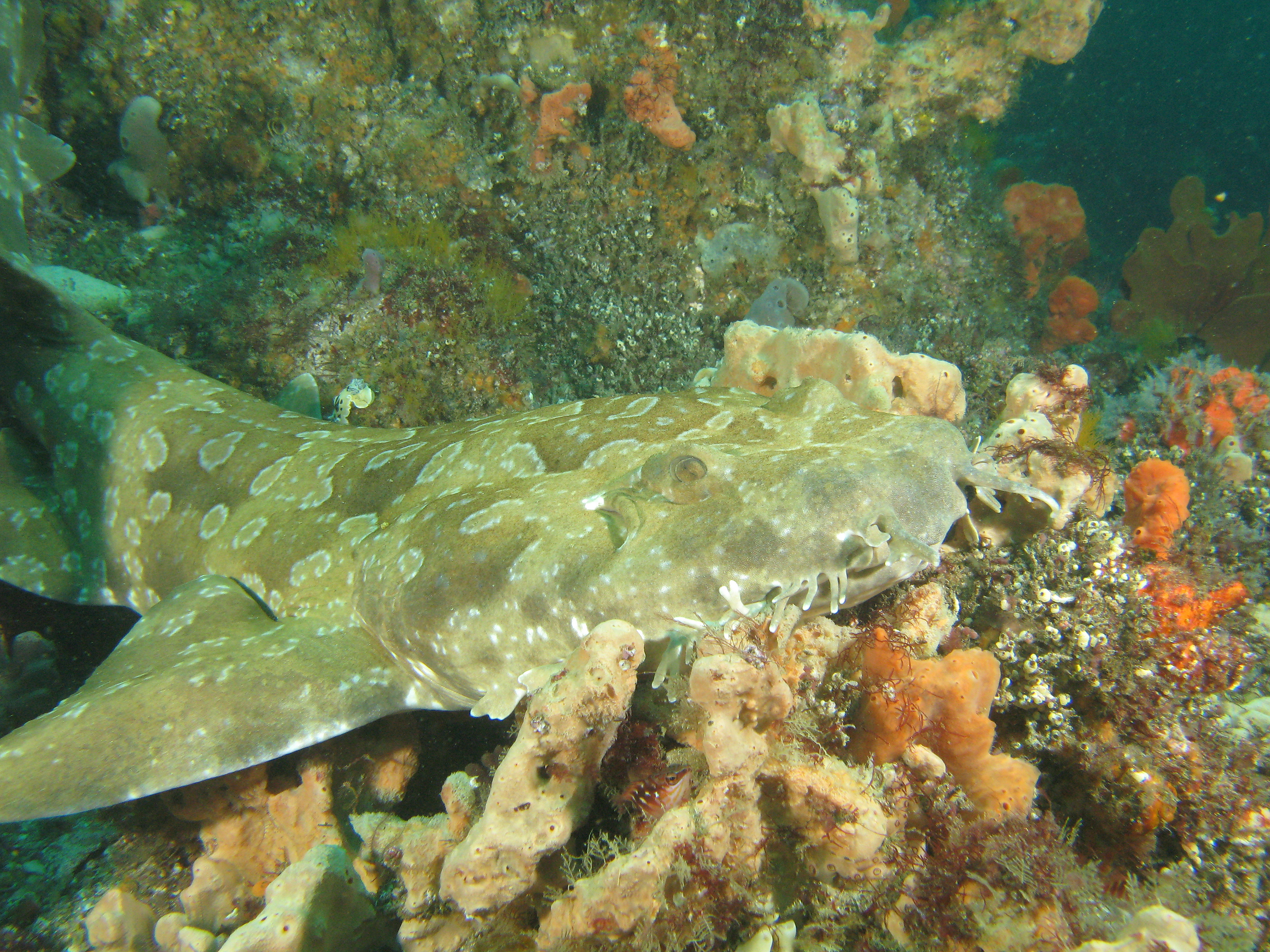
Spotted wobbegong (Orectolobus maculatus)

=== Fishes ===
Endemic species of fish include horseshoe leatherjackets, old wives, senate wrasses, southern hulafish, southern blue devils, and many more. Many fishes are highly specialised: the body shape and colouration of the golden weedfish, for example, perfectly mimics the golden kelp of the Great Southern Reef, while the red handfish has only been found in two small patches of reef off the coast of Tasmania. The spotted wobbegong is a carpet shark that is uniquely designed to blend in with the seafloor. Other sharks include the bottom-dwelling Port Jackson shark, named for a location within the Great Southern Reef. Larger, economically important fishes like southern bluefin tuna patrol the open waters.

Seadragons

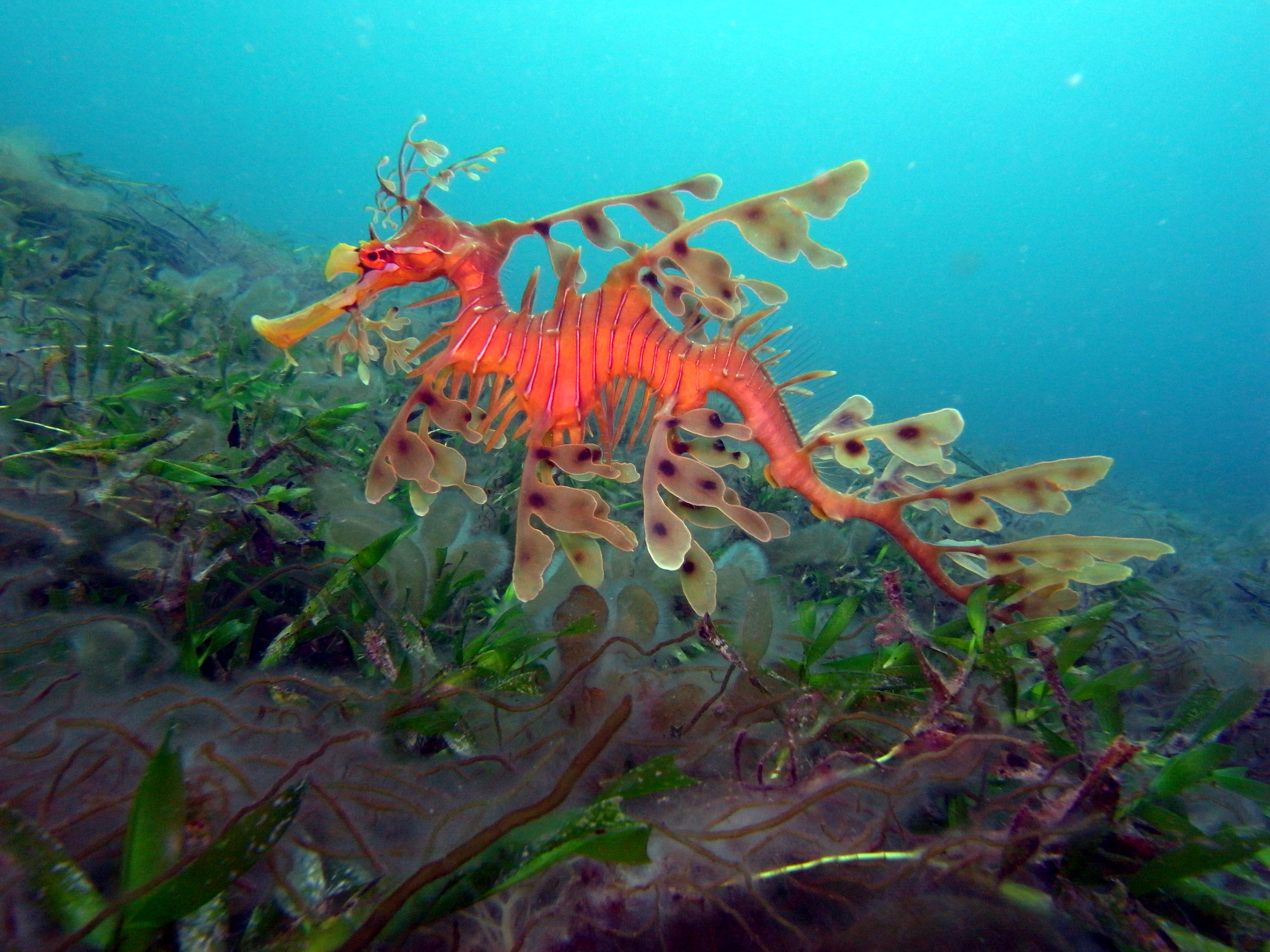
Leafy seadragon (Phycodurus eques)

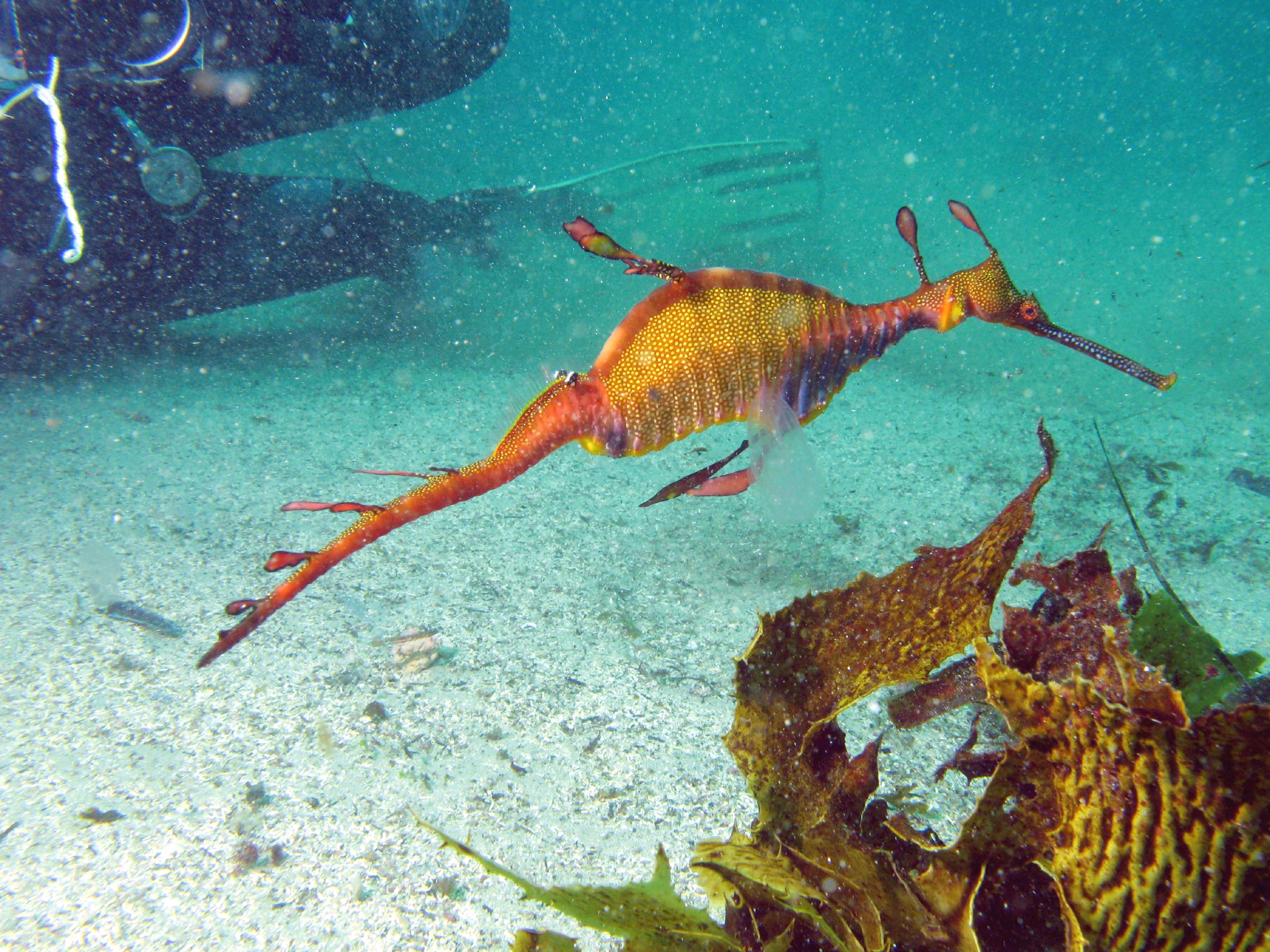
Common seadragon (Phyllopteryx taeniolatus)

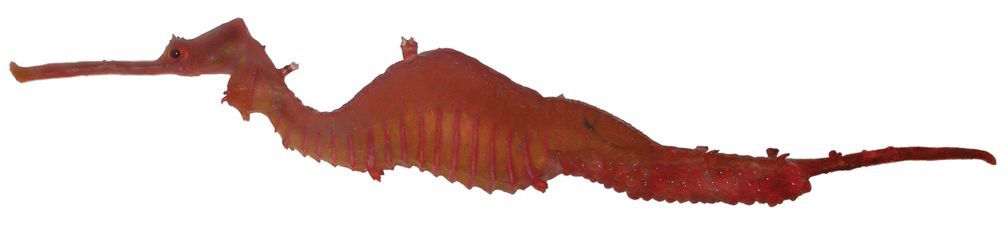
One of the few known specimens of ruby seadragon (Phyllopteryx dewysea)

All three known species of seadragon can be found only on the Great Southern Reef. The leaf-like appendages of leafy and common seadragons allow them to camouflage among the kelp and seaweeds, so well in fact that researchers started Dragon Search, a resource that allows recreational divers to report sightings of seadragons so that their population numbers may be better assessed. The ruby seadragon, believed to be a deeper-water species due in part to its colour, was only discovered in 2015. Their cousins, seahorses and pipefish, are also present. Locally, the seadragons of the Great Southern Reef are an iconic species; the leafy seadragon, or simply "leafy", is the marine emblem of the state of South Australia, and Victoria's is the common seadragon.

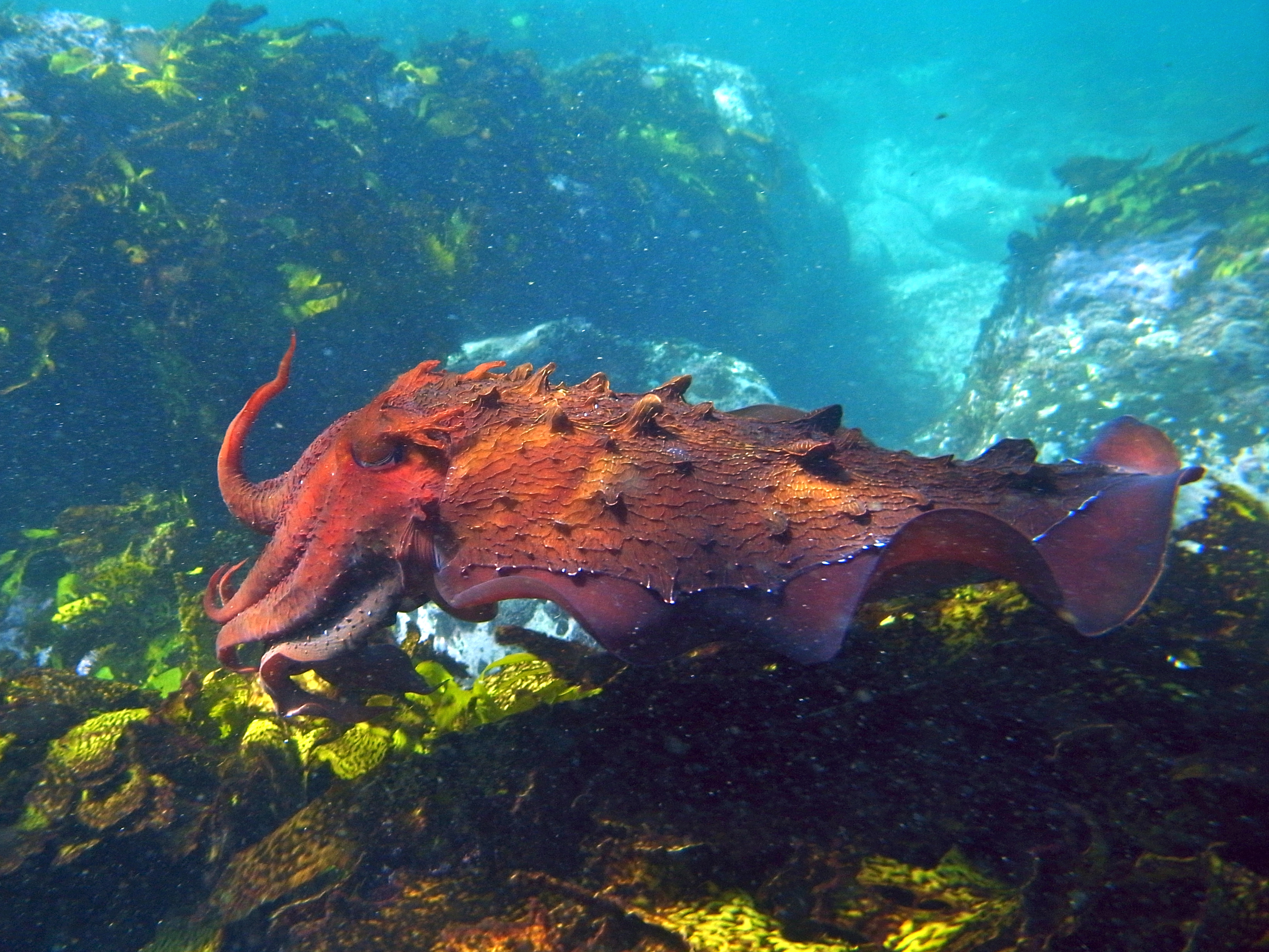
Giant cuttlefish (Sepia apama)

=== Invertebrates ===
Rock lobster and abalone are the best-known invertebrate residents of the Great Southern Reef because of their economic value and ubiquity as foods. There are many species of crustaceans, from large spider crabs to the blue swimmer crab to the hair-like amphipods known as skeleton shrimp. Brightly coloured nudibranchs comb the rocky reefs for algae, sponges, and other food items. The reef has multiple endemic cephalopods: the Giant Australian cuttlefish assemble in large numbers to mate, and the southern species of the blue-ringed octopus hunts with deadly tetrodotoxin. Multiple species of reef and bobtail squid also make their home on the Great Southern Reef.

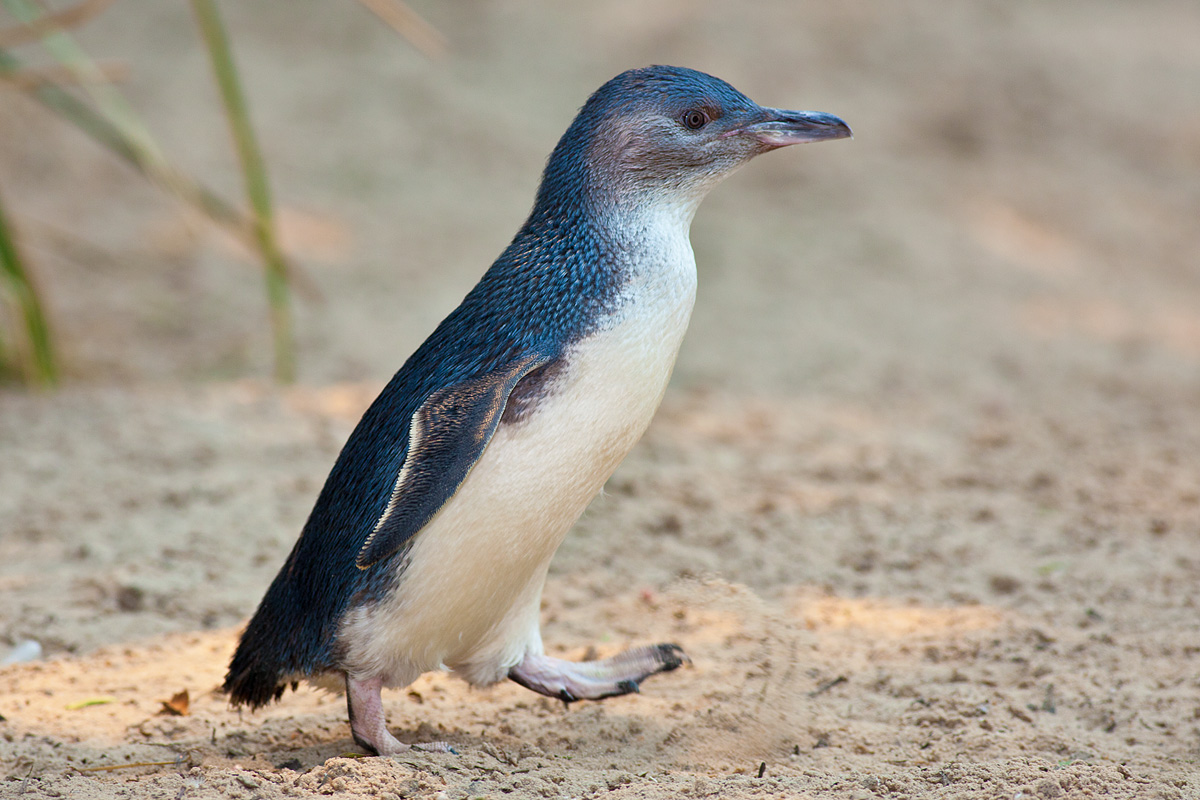
Fairy penguin (Eudyptula novaehollandiae)

=== Birds ===
The demise of kelp forests on the Great Southern Reef has resulted in a lot of dead kelp washing ashore; also known as beach wrack, 40 species of South Australian bird use it in the building of their nests.

There are multiple coastal and island colonies of the world's smallest penguin species, the Australian little penguin or fairy penguin, that feed in the rich waters of the Great Southern Reef. The latest research differentiates this species from the little blues of New Zealand, although they are still collectively considered the smallest species of penguin. These colonies include Sydney's Manly Beach and Montague Island in New South Wales and St Kilda Breakwater in Melbourne. Phillip Island in the state of Victoria is home to the world's largest fairy penguin colony.

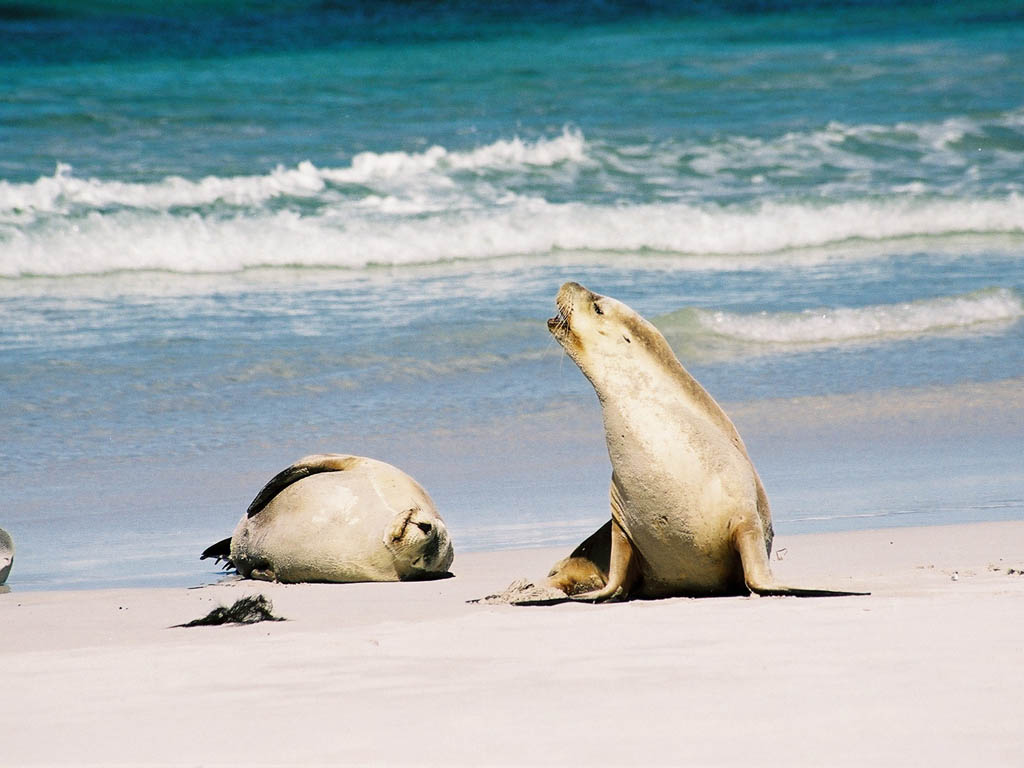
Australian sea lion (Neophoca cinerea)

=== Marine mammals ===
The Great Southern Reef is home to Australia's only endemic pinniped: the Australian sea lion, the only member of the genus Neophoca. They remain vulnerable after being hunted extensively in the 19th century, but today they breed on at least 50 islands within the Great Southern Reef. Seal Bay on Kangaroo Island has a population of sea lions that have become popular with tourists. Southern right whales and the local population of humpback whales are also dependent on the plankton fueled by the conditions in the waters of the Great Southern Reef.

== Aboriginal use ==
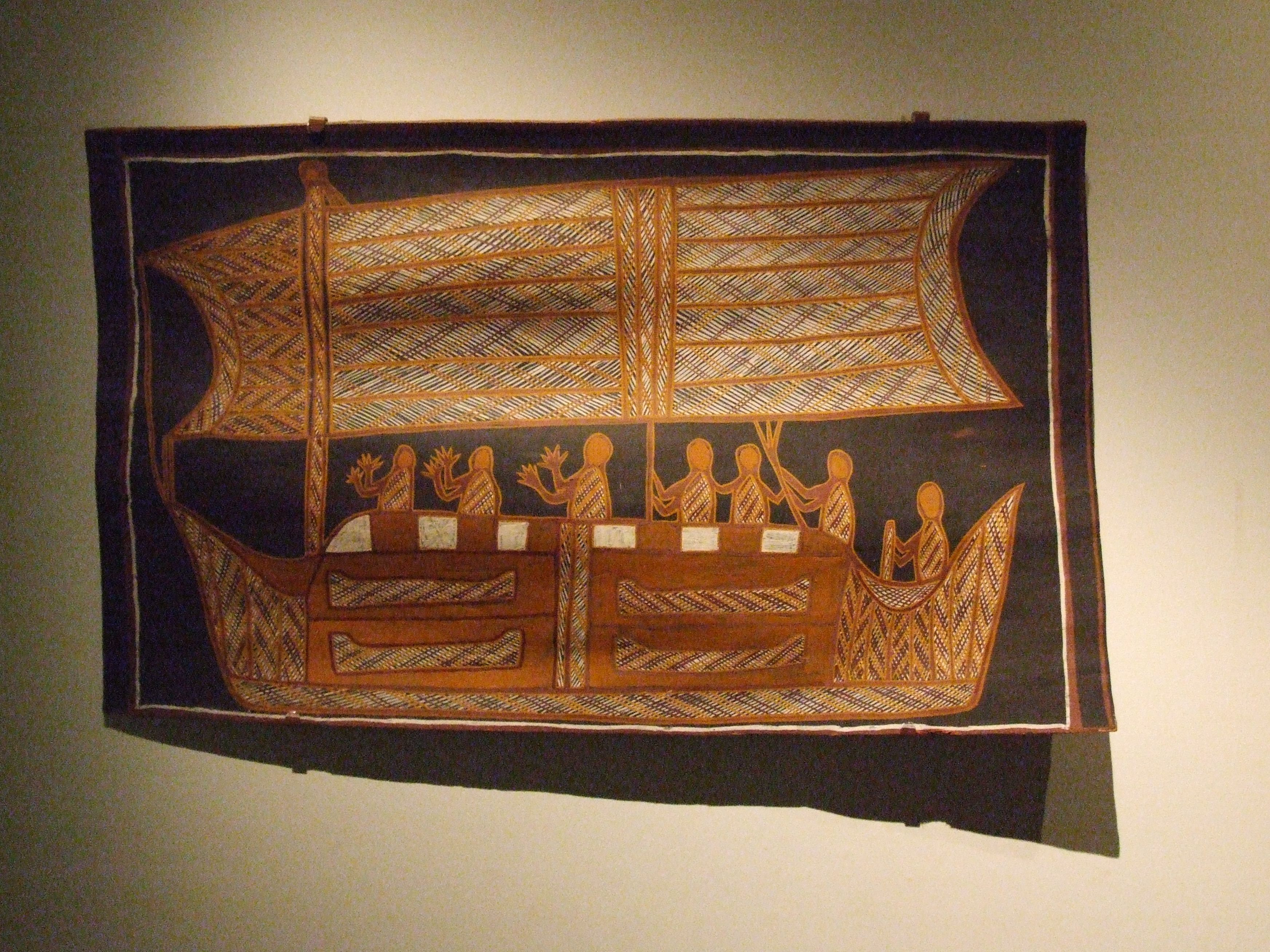
Aboriginal art of seafarers at the Adelaide Museum, South Australia

In Aboriginal culture, the seas surrounding Australia, including the Great Southern Reef and the plentiful resources it has provided for the Aboriginal peoples of southern Australia, may be referred to broadly as “Sea Country” (Yora: garrigarrang nura), a term borrowed from the language of the indigenous Eora people of the Sydney Basin.

For thousands of years, the Aboriginal people of Australia and Tasmania developed strategies for the sustainable use of the Great Southern Reef's many resources, and its value to humans was deeply ingrained in Aboriginal culture. For example, the seasonal calendar of the Kaurna people of the Adelaide region shows the traditional migration between the coast and inland plains in different seasons. During Wirltuti (spring) Kaurna headed to the coast where blue crabs, garfish, shellfish and crustaceans were harvested. Aboriginal people also used kelp in a series of ways, from footwear, food and cultural practices.

Recent developments have included the recruitment of indigenous Australians as park rangers, management in partnership with families and clans, and special zones on the Great Southern Reef where Aboriginal Australians may practice traditional management practices.

== Threats ==
=== Climate change ===
As a temperate ecosystem, stable water temperatures are important to the health of the reef and its residents. Many species are sensitive to even the slightest changes in water temperature and unable to migrate to cooler waters. Accelerated by the 2014-16 El Niño event, which broke multiple warming records for the Pacific Ocean, temperature fluctuations have been largely responsible for the demise of kelp forests on the Great Southern Reef. Currently, the reef contains two locations considered by climate scientists to be "hotspots", or in the top 10% of areas recently affected by warming.

Climate change has played a huge role in the changing of marine ecosystems through ocean warming, changing marine habitats and changing the marine biodiversity. Ocean warming is continuing at a such a rate, that southeastern Australia could be considered one of the fastest warming zones in the southern hemisphere. Along with ocean warming, a high concentration of human population, and a large amount of commercial and recreational fishing have played a detrimental role in the changing of the ecological process. The impacts of climate change have caused a decline in Macrocystis pyrifera (giant kelp), therefore showing a decline in the marine species and their habitat. Additionally, there are high rates of coral bleaching and calcification, disrupting their ability to re-grow and provide habitats for the marine life to move to (Johnson and Holbrook 2014, 2-3).

Oil and gas companies have proposed surveying the Great Australian Bight for fossil fuel extraction, which could impact the Great Southern Reef. Environmental organisations like The Wilderness Society have argued that the depth of the water and rough seas could result in a disastrous oil spill, and the continued burning of fossil fuels contributes to the warming threatening the Great Southern Reef.

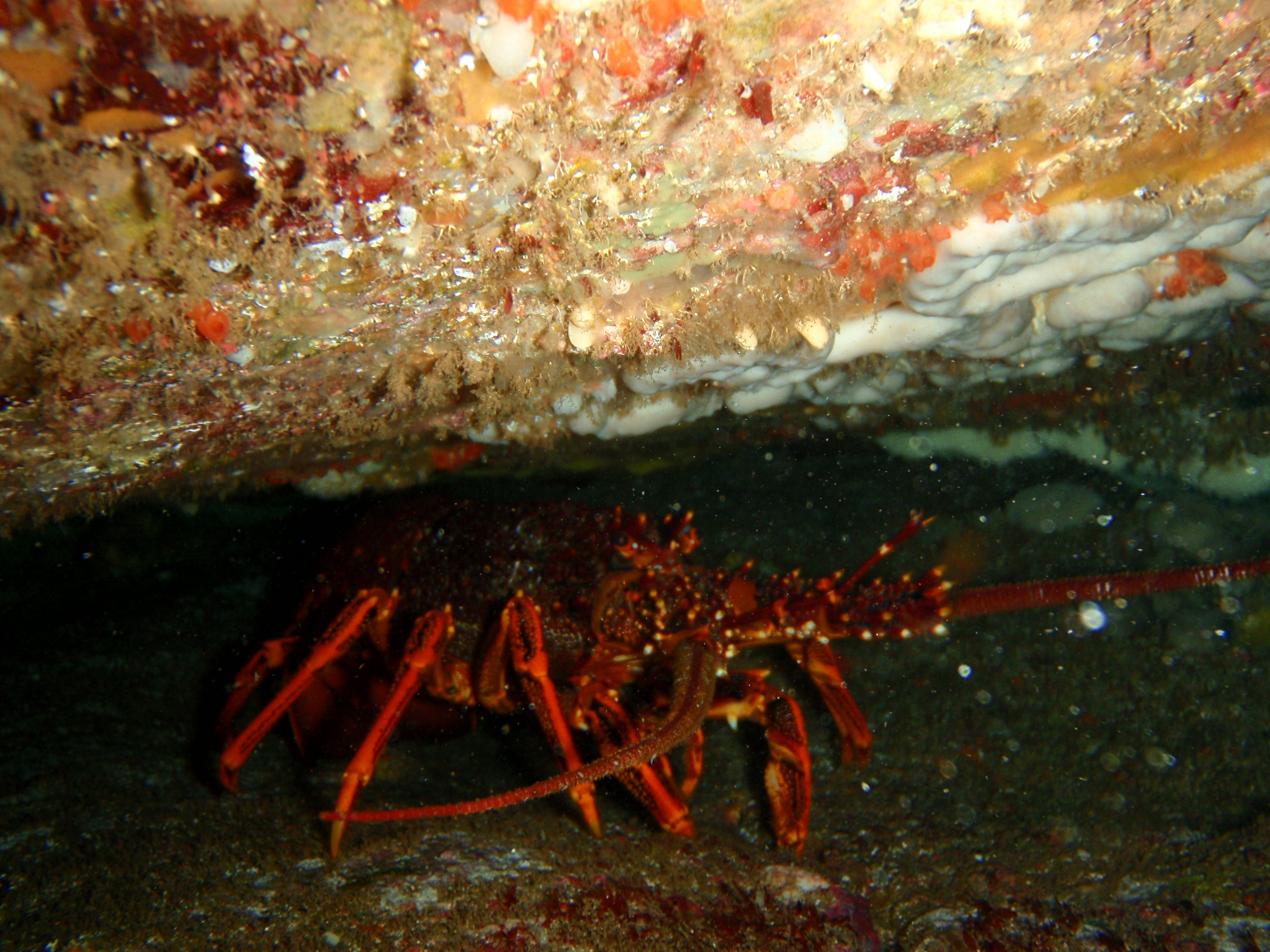
Southern rock lobster (Jasus edwardsii)

=== Fishing ===
For the economy of Australia's southern coast, the Great Southern Reef is an invaluable resource, providing ample opportunities for recreational fishing, swimming, surfing, snorkeling, scuba diving, and other forms of ecotourism, which contribute more than AU$10 billion to the economy each year. The cool, nutrient-rich waters of Australia's temperate sea provide a rich feeding ground for commercially fished animals as well; the two most lucrative fisheries in the entire country, rock lobster (~AU$375 million/year) and abalone (~AU$134 million/year), harvest their catches from the Great Southern Reef. Although Australia has robust regulations in place to protect many of its natural treasures, overfishing is a concern on the Great Southern Reef.

Historically, seadragons have been collected for display in home and public aquariums, but their export is now tightly controlled by the South Australian government. Multiple aquariums have also successfully bred weedy seadragons in captivity.

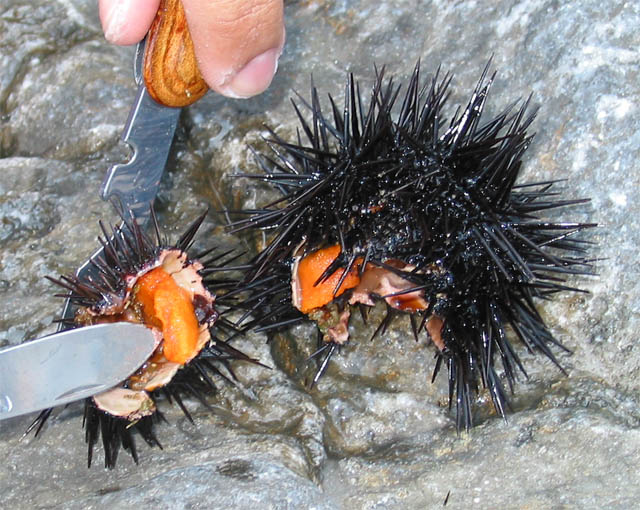
Sea urchin roe, a popular food in many markets worldwide

=== Long-spined sea urchin ===
The recent explosion in the population of long-spined sea urchins (Centrostephanus rodgersii) in the waters south of Australia has been devastating to its kelp forests. The urchins, which are normally found north of the Great Southern Reef, have seen their range expand southward with the warm waters that themselves have caused a mass die-off of kelp. Some estimates have the urchin population on the Great Southern Reef tripling since 2016. If left unchecked by predators, urchins multiple quickly and can eat through entire forests of kelp plants, leaving behind dead zones known as urchin barrens. Rock lobsters are one of the few animals that are able to eat urchins due to the echinoderm's spines, which release an irritating toxin when stimulated, and overfishing of the rock lobster has been blamed in part for the expansion of the urchins' range. In 2022, the Tasmanian government released their strategy for "tackling the long spined sea urchin", which involves subsidising the commercial dive fishery as well as training recreational divers to protect important patches of kelp forest. As of June 2022, commercial divers alone have removed 2,400 tonnes (2,400,000 kg) of urchins over the past decade.

== Conservation ==
Only 9.8% of Australia's national waters are considered "fully/highly protected from fishing". Much of that concentrated around the Great Barrier Reef, the largest coral reef system in the world, which is encompassed by the expansive Coral Sea Marine Park. The coastline of southern Australia is dotted with a number of smaller marine protected areas, although some extend out to the limits of Australian national waters. These areas can be roughly divided into South-west and South-east networks. They range from more lightly regulated multiple use zones and special purpose zones to more tightly controlled marine parks, many of them protecting particular natural features like the Neptune Islands. Some of these areas are set aside specifically for traditional resource management. In lieu of becoming a UNESCO World Heritage Site like the Great Barrier Reef, Mission Blue, the organisation founded by marine biologist Sylvia Earle, has designated the Great Southern Reef as a "Hope Spot" and worked with local advocates to preserve the reef.

Hoping to find a solution that will restore Australia's temperate kelp forests, researchers have been trying to seed kelp in deforested areas with some success. Aquaculture companies have also invested in kelp farming in the region, in particular the cultivation of Asparagopsis, a red seaweed that when added in small amounts to the feed of livestock can cut their methane emissions by as much as 90%.

The future of the Great Southern Reef depends on addressing human-caused climate change, as fluctuations in water temperature are primarily responsible for its decline.

== See also ==
- Temperate Australasia
- Giant kelp forests of Southeast Australia
