= Northeast Shelf Province =

Marine bioregion in northeastern Australia

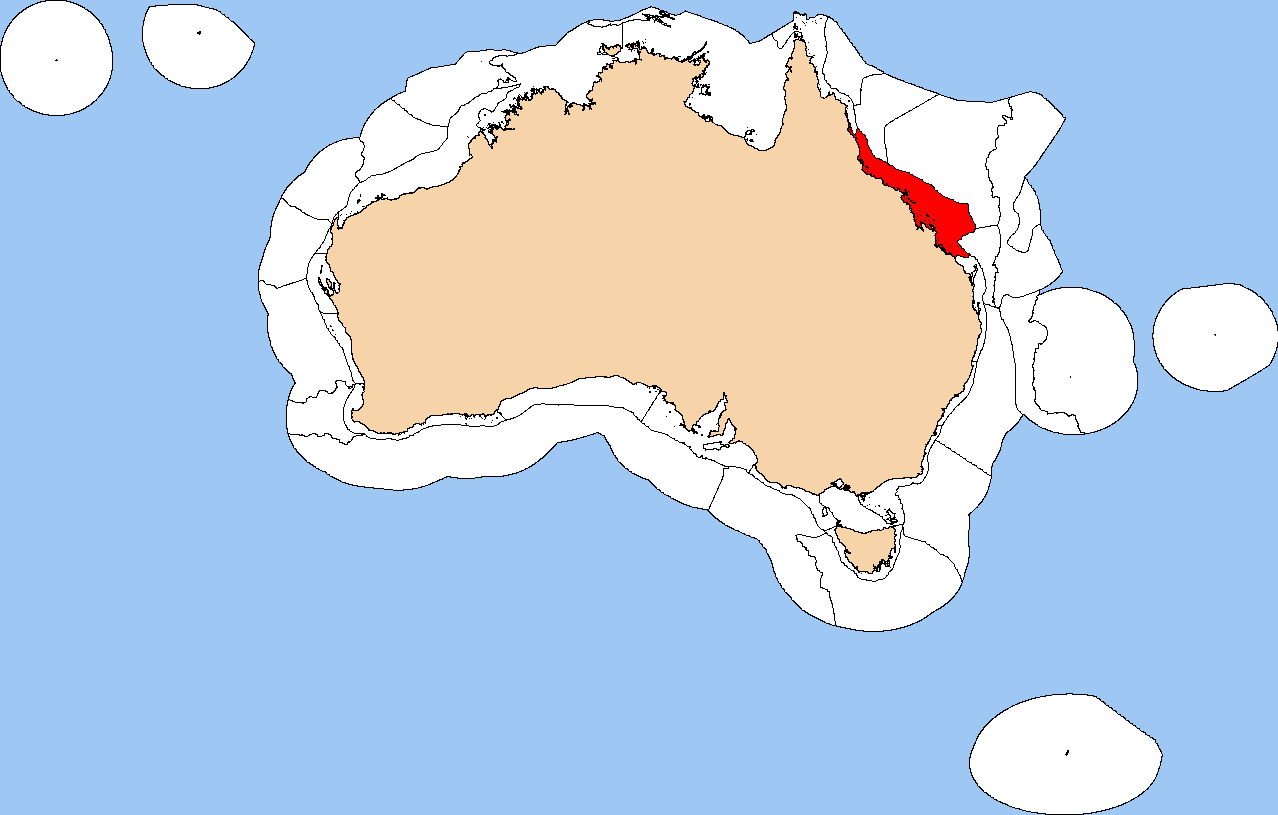
Map of the Northeast Shelf Province

The Northeast Shelf Province is a biogeographic region of Australia's coastal and continental shelf waters. It includes the tropical coastal waters of the central and southern Great Barrier Reef in northeastern Australia. It is a provincial level bioregion in the Integrated Marine and Coastal Regionalisation of Australia (IMCRA) system. It corresponds to the Central and Southern Great Barrier Reef marine ecoregion in the WWF's Marine Ecoregions of the World system.

== Geography ==
The Northeast Shelf Province extends along the eastern coast of Australia, from Cooktown/Cairns at its northern end to just north of Baffle Creek at its southern end. It extends from the shore to the edge of the continental shelf, and includes the central and southern portion of the Great Barrier Reef. On the north it adjoins the Northeast Shelf Transition, which includes the northern portion of the Great Barrier Reef and the Torres Strait. On the south it adjoins the Central Eastern Shelf Transition, the transition between the tropical waters of eastern Australia to the warm temperate coastal waters further south.

=== Meso-scale bioregions ===
The province contains six meso-scale bioregions:

- West Tropic Coast (WTC)
- Central Reef (CR)
- Lucinda-Mackay Coast (LMC)
- Shoalwater Coast (SC)
- Mackay-Capricorn (MC)
- Pompey-Swains (PS)

== Ecology ==
The bioregion has the greatest number of coral reef species in Australia. These include many eastern tropical endemic species, some of which extend into the adjacent transition regions.
