= Western Bass Strait Shelf Transition =

Marine bioregion in Southern Australia

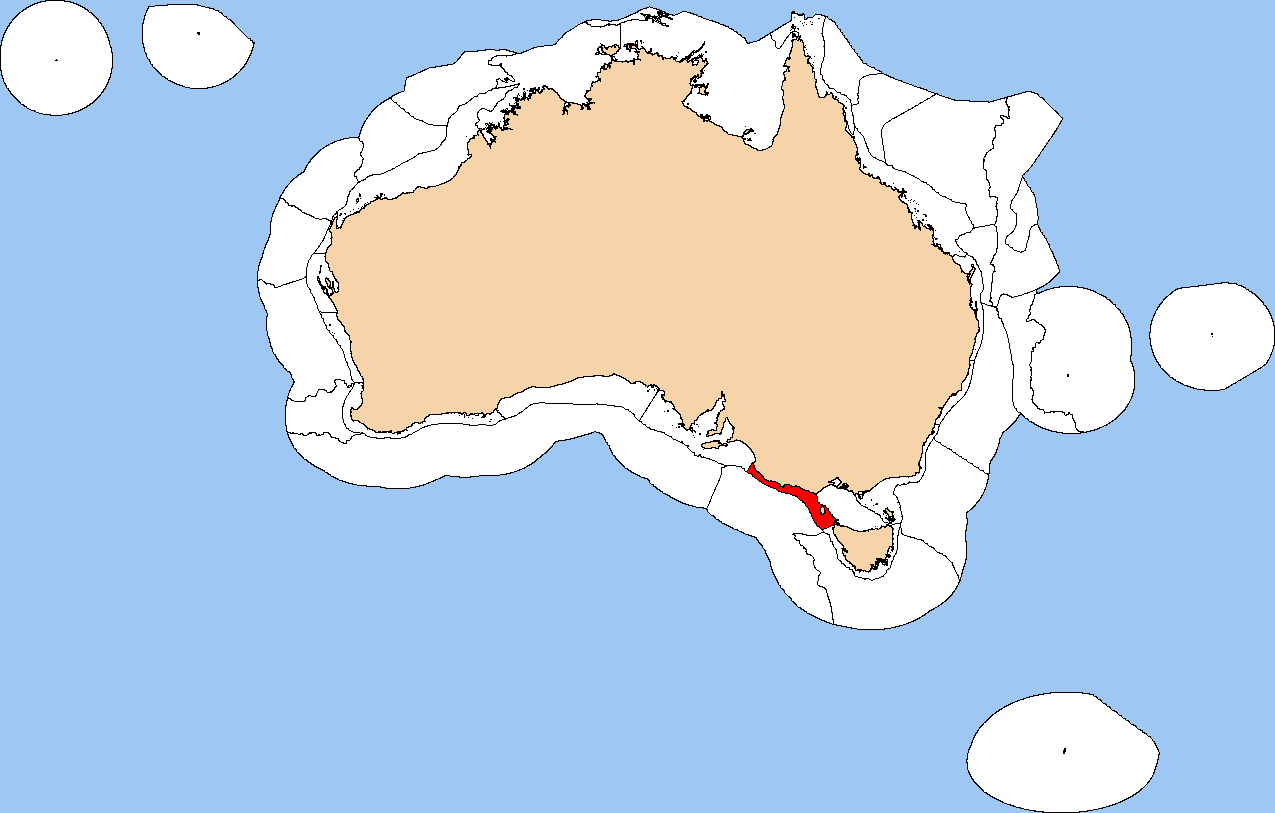
Map of the Western Bass Strait Shelf Transition

The Western Bass Strait Shelf Transition is a biogeographic region of Australia's coastal and continental shelf waters. It is a transitional region between the cold-temperate Bass Strait Shelf and Tasmanian Shelf provinces and the warm-temperate Spencer Gulf Shelf Province. It is a provincial bioregion in the Integrated Marine and Coastal Regionalisation of Australia (IMCRA) system. It is the southern portion of the Western Bassian marine ecoregion in the World Wildlife Fund's (WWF) Marine Ecoregions of the World system.

== Geography ==
The Western Bass Strait Shelf Transition extends from Cape Jaffa in South Australia to the western end of the Bass Strait. It includes the southern Limestone Coast of South Australia, the western coast of Victoria east to Cape Otway, and the waters around King Island as far as Tasmania's northwestern tip.

The continental shelf is generally narrow, and the coast is subject to high-energy waves. It at the eastern end of the warm Leeuwin Current, which weakens during the summer months, allowing nutrient-rich cold water upwelling along the coast. During the winter the Leeuwin Current's influence makes the transition's waters warmer than those of the adjacent Bassian and Tasmanian provinces.

== Ecology ==
The biota includes many cold-temperate species from the Bass Strait and Tasmanian provinces. Smaller numbers of species are shared with the warm-temperate Central Eastern Province further east, and the Southwest Shelf and Spencer Gulf Shelf provinces to the west.

== Meso-scale bioregions ==
In IMCRA version 4.0, the transition contains a single meso-scale bioregion, Otway. In version 3.3 of the IMCRA, the Coorong bioregion to the northwest was also part of the transition, but version 4.0 includes it in the Spencer Gulf Shelf Province. The Western Bassian marine ecoregion, as delineated by the WWF, includes both the Coorong and Otway bioregions.
