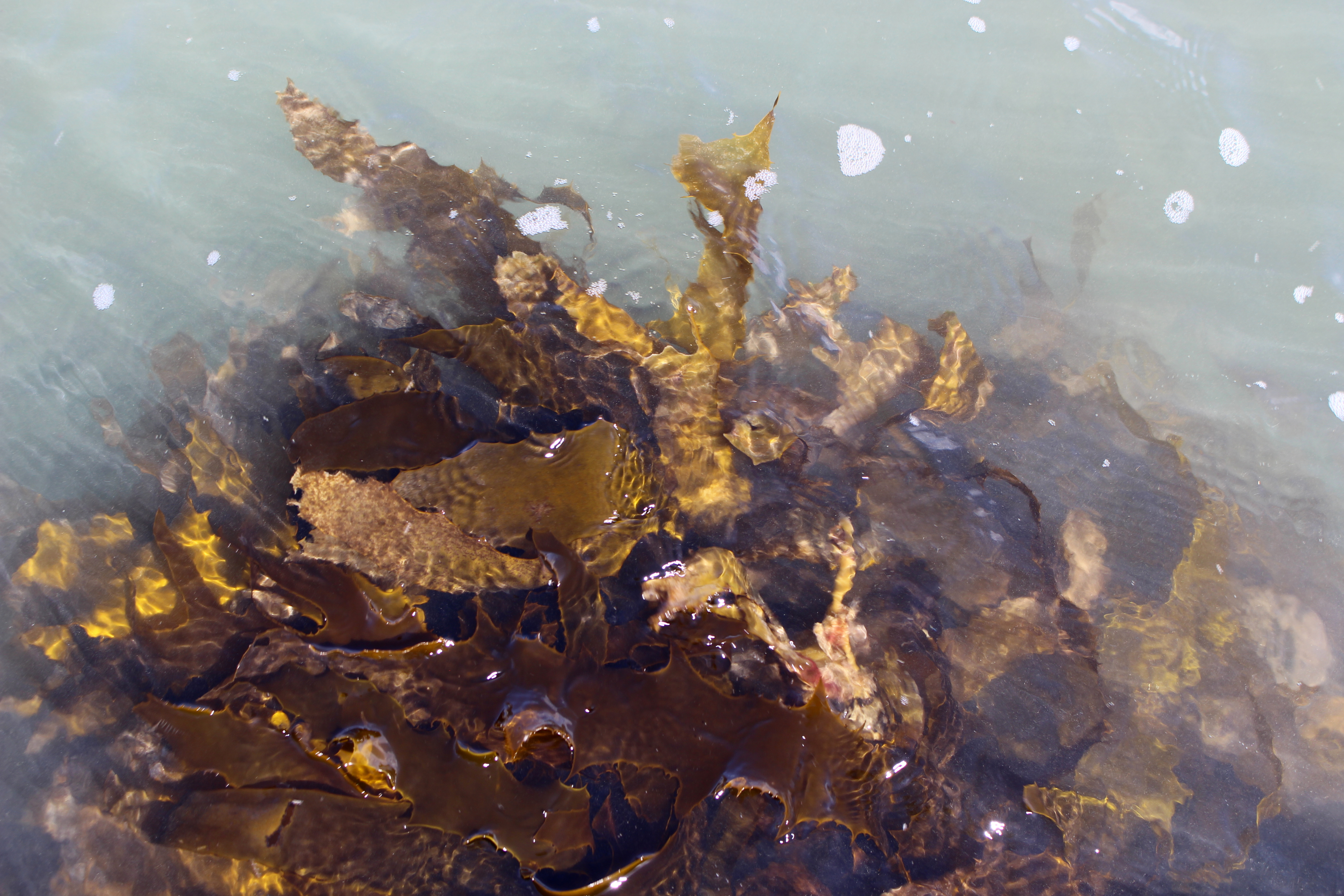
- Barangaroo, Australia

Scientific classification
- Domain: Eukaryota
- Clade: Sar
- Clade: Stramenopiles
- Division: Ochrophyta
- Class: Phaeophyceae
- Order: Laminariales
- Family: Lessoniaceae
- Genus: Ecklonia
- Species: E. radiata

Binomial name
- Ecklonia radiata (C.Agardh) J.Agardh

Synonyms
- Capea biruncinata var. denuda Sonder, 1846; Capea biruncinata var. elongata Sonder, 1846; Capea radiata (C.Agardh) Endlicher, 1843; Fucus radiatus Turner, 1808; Laminaria flabelliformis A.Richard, 1832; Laminaria radiata C.Agardh, 1817

= Ecklonia radiata =

Species of seaweed

Ecklonia radiata, commonly known as golden kelp, common kelp, spiny kelp or leather kelp, is a species of kelp found in the Canary Islands, the Cape Verde Islands, Madagascar, Mauritania, Senegal, South Africa, Oman, southern Australia, Lord Howe Island, and New Zealand. In Australia, E. radiata forms the backbone of the Great Southern Reef, a system of interconnected kelp reefs that spans the coastline of southern Australia, underpinning biodiverse and productive ecosystems, and supporting valuable ecosystem services.

Ecklonia radiata grows in kelp beds on reefs and where sheltered can form dense 'forests'. It can be found in the low intertidal zone to depths of approximately 25 metres (82 ft) and rarely exceeds a body length of 1 metre (3 ft 3 in).
