= Southwest Shelf Transition =

Bioregion in Western Australia

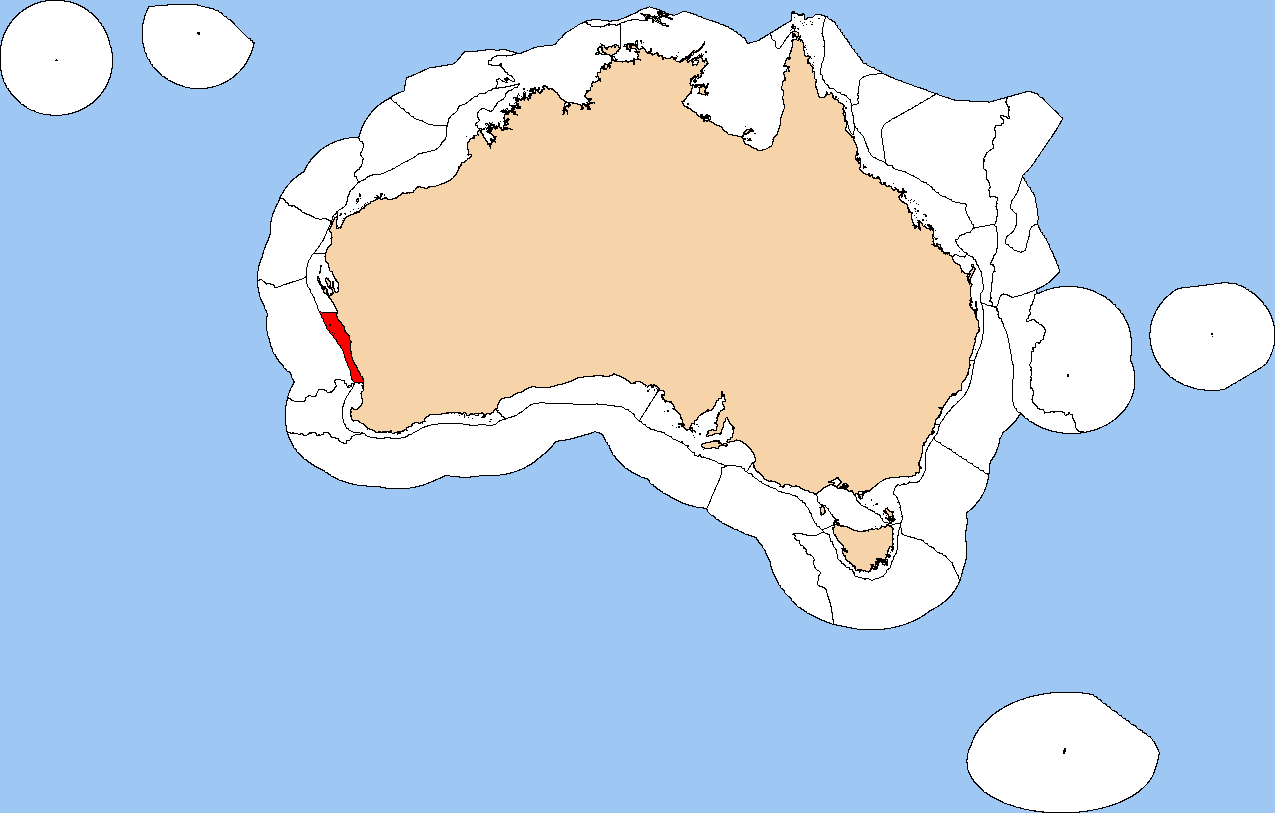
Map of the Southwest Shelf Transition

The Southwest Shelf Transition, also known as the Houtman marine ecoregion, is a biogeographic region of Australia's continental shelf and coastal waters. It includes the subtropical coastal waters of Southwest Australia.

== Geography ==
The Southwest Shelf Transition includes the coastal waters and continental shelf of the west coast of Western Australia, extending from Kalbarri to Perth, and including the Houtman Abrolhos archipelago. It is a transitional zone between the subtropical Central Western Shelf Province to the north, and the warm temperate Southwest Shelf Province to the south. The warm Leeuwin Current runs southwards along the coast.

The continental shelf is generally narrow. The coastline is affected by moderate-energy swells from the Indian Ocean.

Depth ranges from zero to nearly 300 metres, with a mean depth of 41 metres. Geomorphically the seabed is almost entirely shelf, but there is a small area of scarp at the northern limits.

The Houtman Abrolhos Archipelago lies about 60 km from the mainland coast, near the edge of the continental shelf. The archipelago is made up of three groups of low islands. Each group rests on a shallow undersea carbonate platform that includes extensive coral reefs. It is the southernmost coral reef system in the Indian Ocean.

== Ecology ==
Biologically, it is a highly complex transition zone, with many species from other provinces reaching a limit of their range in this bioregion. In particular, it represents a northern limit of a number of warm temperate species, and the southern limit of a number of sub-tropical and tropical species. The Houtman Abrolhos is home to the highest concentration of west coast endemic species.

== Meso-scale bioregions ==
The Integrated Marine and Coastal Regionalisation of Australia (IMCRA) identifies two meso-scale bioregions that make up the transition.

- Abrolhos Islands (ABR), consisting of the marine environment immediately surrounding the Houtman Abrolhos
- Central West Coast (CWC) which comprises the remaining area.

== Delineation ==
This bioregion was referred to as the South Western Biotone in Integrated Marine and Coastal Regionalisation of Australia (IMCRA) Version 3.3, and as the Southwest IMCRA Transition in the National Marine Bioregionalisation of Australia. Both Southwest IMCRA Transition and Southwest Shelf Transition are used in IMCRA Version 4.0.
