= Central Western Shelf Province =

Marine bioregion in Western Australia

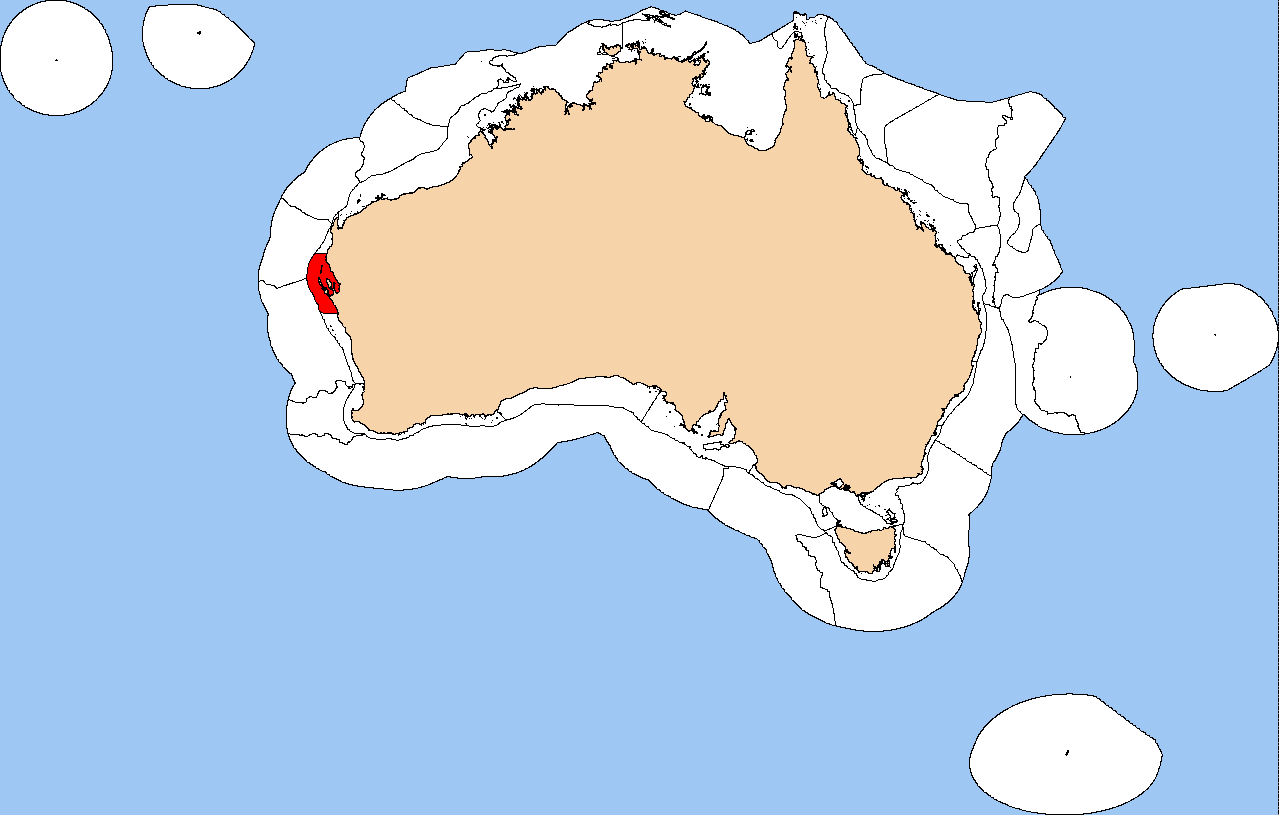
Map of the Central Western Shelf Province

The Central Western Shelf Province, also known as the Shark Bay marine ecoregion, is a biogeographic region of Australia's continental shelf and coastal waters. It includes the subtropical coastal waters of Western Australia.

== Geography ==
The Central Western Shelf Province includes the subtropical coastal waters and continental shelf along Western Australia's west coast, extending from Gnaraloo Bay to Kalbarri. It bounded on the north by the Central Western Shelf Transition, or Ningaloo Coast, which is a transitional zone between the subtropical and tropical coastal waters. On the south it is bounded by the Southwest Shelf Transition, a transition from subtropical waters to the warm temperate waters further south. The warm Leeuwin Current runs southwards along the coast.

The continental shelf is narrow. The coastline is generally rocky with narrow fringing reefs, and exposed to high-energy swells from the Indian Ocean. The Zuytdorp Cliffs are dramatic limestone seacliffs which extend along the southern coastline from the northern tip of the Edel Land peninsula to the mouth of the Murchison River near Kalbarri.

Shark Bay is a large sheltered embayment, nearly enclosed by Bernier, Dorre, and Dirk Hartog islands and Edel Land.

== Ecology ==
The biota of the province is characterised by a suite of subtropical species, whose range generally extends northwards along the Ningaloo Coast, and southwards into the South Western Shelf Transition, particularly the Houtman Abrolhos reefs and Archipelago. This faunal community was recognised in Barry Hutchins' survey of reef fish (1994), and represents the southern part of G. P. Whitley’s (1937) Dampierian Province.

Shark Bay is the largest and most ecologically important embayment between Exmouth Gulf and Cockburn Sound. It is home to extensive seagrass meadows and calcareous sand banks which provide habitat for rich and diverse communities of fishes, invertebrates, and macrophytic algae, along with a significant dugong (Dugong dugon) population. Stromatolites, rare colonies of cyanobacteria and other bacteria which form microbial mats up to a meter high, are found in sheltered lagoons. Shark Bay was designated a World Heritage Site in 1991.

== Meso-scale bioregions ==
The Integrated Marine and Coastal Regionalisation of Australia (IMCRA) identifies two meso-scale bioregions that make up the transition:

- Shark Bay (SBY) includes the inner waters of Shark Bay, south of Cape Ronsard on Bernier Island.
- Zuytdorp (ZUY) includes the mainland coast from Gnaraloo Bay south to Carnarvon, the western side of the islands enclosing Shark Bay and the Zuytdorp Cliffs along the western shore of Edel Land and the southern mainland.
