= Southeast Shelf Transition =

Marine bioregion in Southeastern Australia

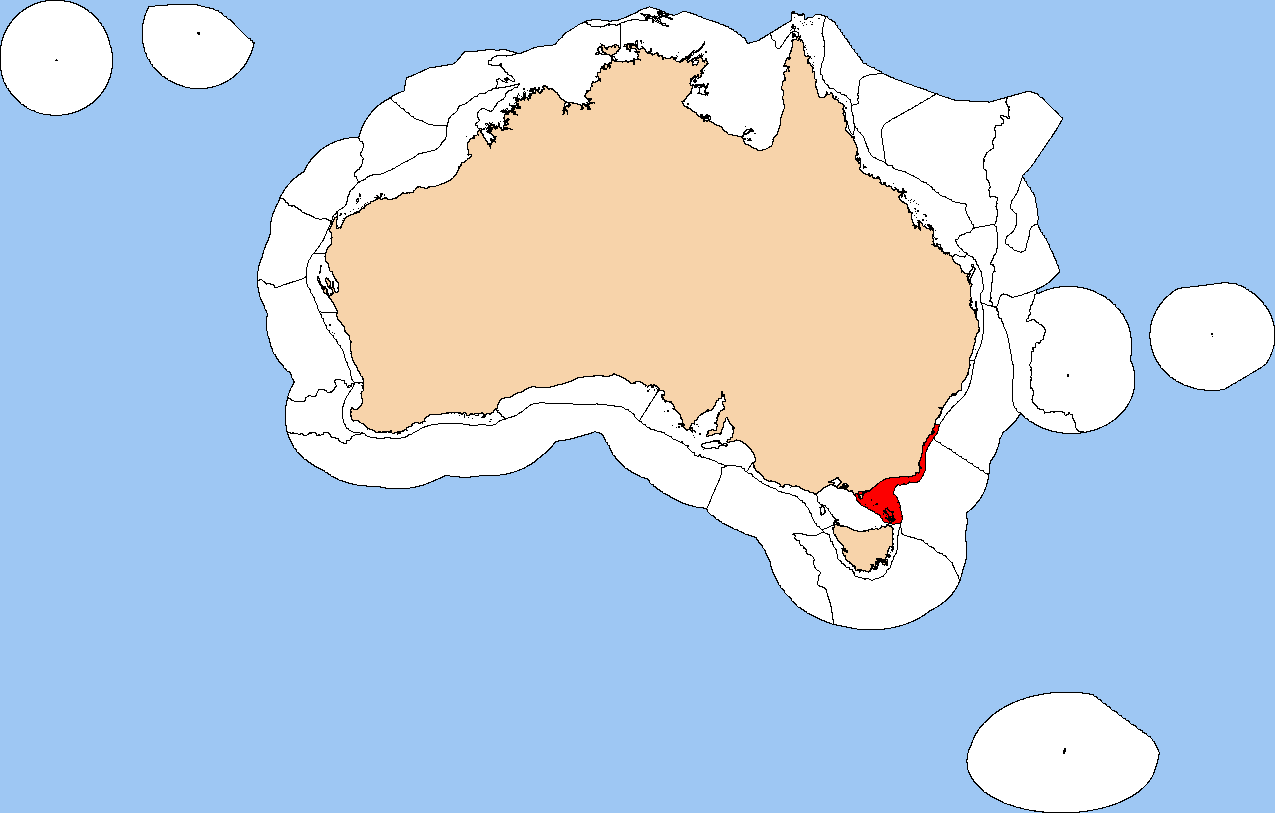
Map of the Southeast Shelf Transition

The Southeast Shelf Transition is a biogeographic region of Australia's coastal and continental shelf waters. It covers a portion of Australia's southeastern coast, from southern New South Wales to eastern Victoria, including the islands of the Kent Group and Furneaux Group at the eastern end of the Bass Strait. It is a provincial level bioregion in the Integrated Marine and Coastal Regionalisation of Australia (IMCRA) system, and is a transitional region between the warm temperate Central Eastern Shelf Province to the northeast and the cool temperate Bass Strait Shelf and Tasmanian Shelf provinces to the west and south. It corresponds to the Cape Howe marine ecoregion in the WWF's Marine Ecoregions of the World system.

== Geography ==
The Southeast Shelf Province extends along Australia's southeastern coast from south of Wollongong in New South Wales to Wilsons Promontory in Victoria, and south to Cape Portland at Tasmania's northeastern tip, enclosing the Furneaux and Kent groups of islands at the eastern end of the Bass Strait. It adjoins the Bass Strait Shelf Province on the southwest, and the Tasmanian Shelf Province on the south. On the east it extends to the edge of the continental shelf.

The transition marks the southernmost influence of the warm East Australian Current, which brings warmer water as far as the eastern Bass Strait.

=== Meso-scale bioregions ===
The province contains three meso-scale bioregions:

- Twofold Shelf
- Batemans Shelf
- Flinders

== Ecology ==
The biota of the bioregion is dominated by warm temperate species characteristic of the Central Eastern Province, with a smaller number of cool-temperate species from the Bass Strait Shelf and Tasmanian provinces, and a few tropical species from the Northeast Shelf Province. There is a major disjunction of species' ranges at Cape Howe, which marks the southernmost range of several warm water species and the northern extent of several cold temperate species.
