= Tweed-Moreton =

Marine biogeographic region in Australia

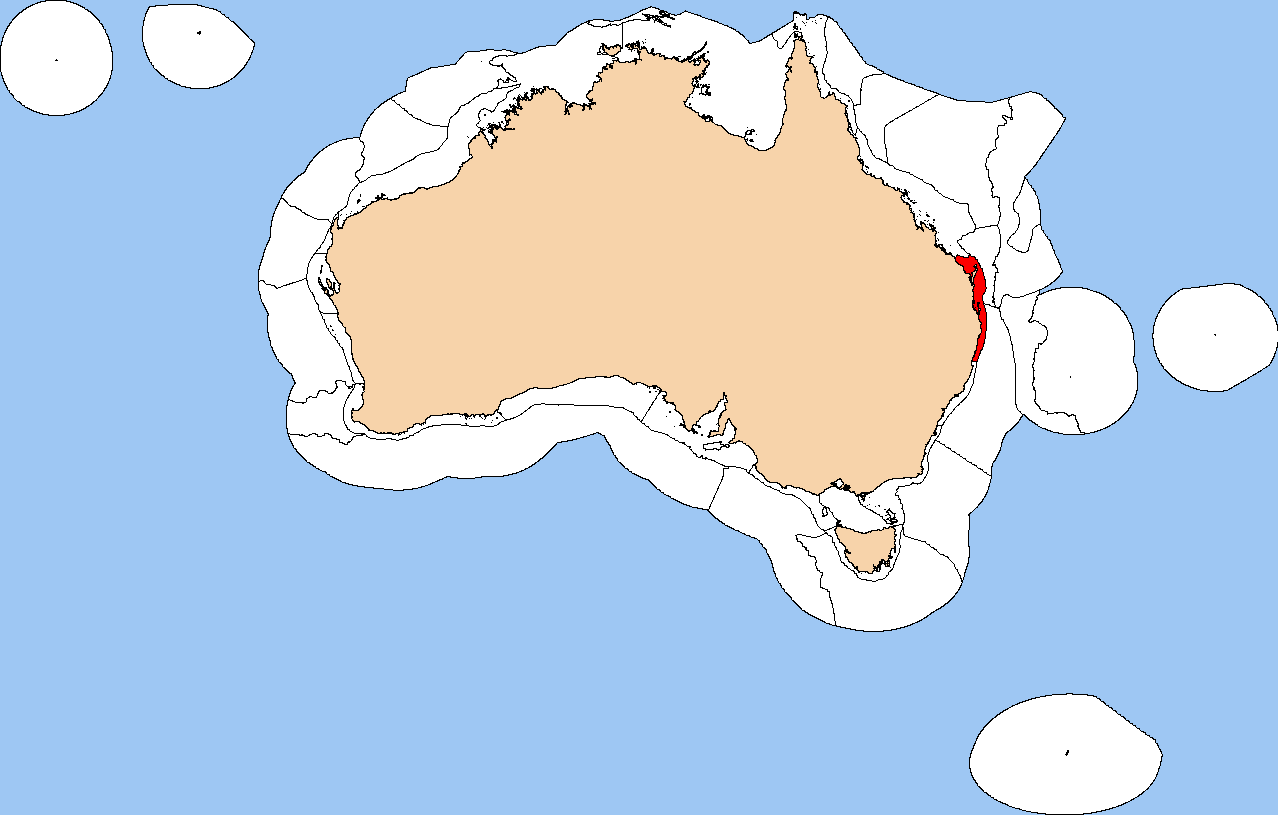
location of the Tweed–Moreton marine ecoregion

Tweed–Moreton, also known as the Central Eastern Shelf Transition, is a marine biogeographic region of eastern Australia.

The region includes the coastal and estuarine waters from just north of the Baffle Creek estuary in Queensland to north of Nambucca Heads in New South Wales. It extends from the shore to the edge of the narrow continental shelf, with an area of 46,484 km^{2}.

It is a transition zone between the tropical waters of the northeastern Australian coast (Northeast Shelf Province) and the warm temperate seas of the central eastern Australian coast (Manning-Hawkesbury or Central Eastern Shelf Province).

It is defined as both a bioregional province and meso-scale bioregion in the Integrated Marine and Coastal Regionalisation of Australia (IMCRA). and as a marine ecoregion in the Marine Ecoregions of the World system developed by the World Wide Fund for Nature (WWF).

== Oceanography ==
Coastal ocean circulation is dominated by the main stream of the East Australian Current. It runs southwards parallel to the shore, moving tropical Coral Sea waters into the temperate continental shelf waters. Localised centres of upwelling occur during springtime on a 40-day cycle off Evans Head (29°17’S). When upwelling is active it increases nutrient levels five- to ten-fold over normal values.

The region is characterised by extensive sandy beaches punctuated by rocky headlands. There are extensive coastal estuaries behind sand islands, and offshore barrier islands. Beaches and sediments are generally of terrestrial origin.

Tides range from 1 to 3 metres. Typical wave breaker heights are between 1.4 and 3.0 metres. Wave energy generally peaks in July, with a secondary peak during February in the New South Wales (southern) section.

== Ecology ==
Tweed–Moreton is near the southern limit of hard corals, with 60 coral genera in the north and fewer than 50 in the south. Sandstone outcrops form the substrate for reef faunas. These include the offshore Flinders Reef and fringing reefs at Hervey Bay.

The New South Wales portion has two distinctive species assemblages of temperate reef fishes, echinoderms, and gastropods, and a single distinctive species assemblage of hermatypic corals and bivalves.

The region has a distinctive assemblage of algal species. There is a significant difference in occurrences of seagrass species from north to south along the coast. The offshore benthic fauna is not well known.

Low closed to open mangrove forest communities are found along sheltered coasts and rivers. There are eight mangrove tree species and three mangrove understorey species in the Queensland portion, along with 14 species of saltmarsh plants. Mangrove development and species diversity is lower in the New South Wales portion.

== Protected areas ==
Protected marine areas include Great Sandy Biosphere Reserve, Moreton Bay Marine Park, Cape Byron Marine Park, Richmond River Nature Reserve, and Solitary Islands Marine Park.
