= Spencer Gulf Shelf Province =

Marine bioregion in Southern Australia

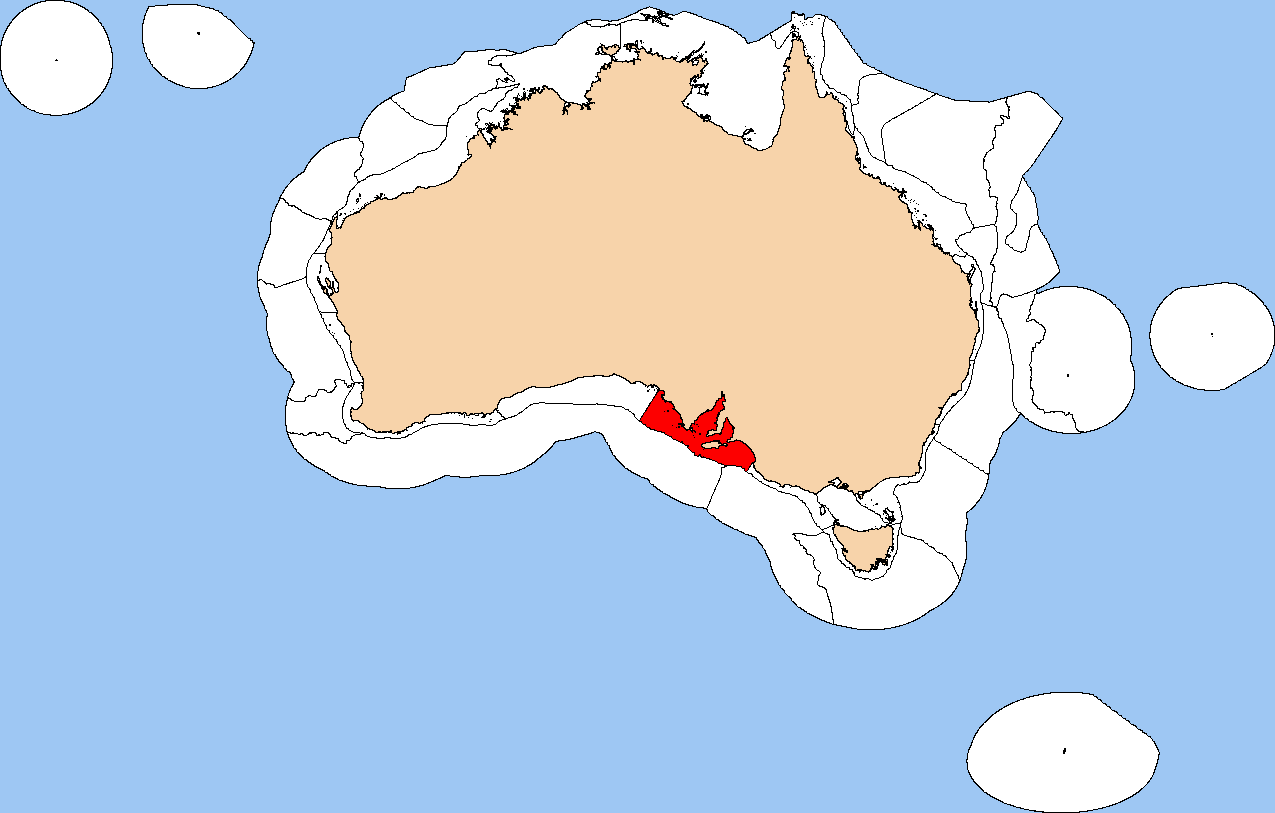
Map of the Spencer Gulf Shelf Province

The Spencer Gulf Shelf Province, also known as the South Australian Gulfs marine ecoregion, is a biogeographic region of Australia's continental shelf and coastal waters. It includes the warm temperate coastal waters of South Australia's central coast. It is a provincial bioregion in the Integrated Marine and Coastal Regionalisation of Australia (IMCRA) system.

== Geography ==
The Spencer Gulf Shelf Province includes the warm temperate coastal waters and continental shelf of the eastern Great Australian Bight, Spencer Gulf and St Vincent Gulf, the waters around Kangaroo Island, and the Coorong coast. It extends from Point Brown in the west to Cape Jaffa in the east, and out to the edge of the continental shelf. It bounded on the west by the Great Australian Bight Shelf Transition, and to the east by the Western Bass Strait Shelf Transition.

The bioregion is influenced by the warm Leeuwin Current, which runs eastwards along the coast. Stretches of coast facing the open ocean, particularly along the west coast of the Eyre Peninsula and at the 'Kangaroo Island Pool' south of Kangaroo Island, experience cold-water upwelling during the summer months, known as the Great South Australian Coastal Upwelling System.

The Spencer and St Vincent gulfs are largely enclosed by semi-arid land with little freshwater inflow, resulting in hypersaline waters and subtropical water temperatures.

=== Meso-scale bioregions ===
The IMCRA identifies five meso-scale bioregions that make up the province:

- Coorong (COR), Cape Jaffa to Cape Jervis.
- Eyre (EYR), Point Brown to Cape Torrens, to West Cape, to Port Neill and Cape Willoughby.
- North Spencer Gulf (NSG), extends from Point Riley to Port Augusta to Shoalwater Point.
- St Vincent Gulf (SVG), extends from Cape Torrens to West Cape, Cape Jervis to Cape Willoughby.
- Spencer Gulf (SG), West Cape to Port Neill, Point Riley to Shoalwater Point.

In version 3.3 of the IMCRA, the province was known as Gulfs Province, and Coorong bioregion was included in the neighboring Western Bass Strait Shelf Transition. Version 4.0 renamed the province Spencer Gulf Shelf and added Coorong.

== Ecology ==
The biota of the province is characterised by warm temperate species, many of which range westwards across the Bight into Southwest Australia. Some cool-temperate species characteristic of the Bass Strait and Tasmania reach the western extent of their range here. The gulfs, which are hypersaline and warmer than the surrounding waters, are refugia for some subtropical and endemic species.

New Zealand fur seals (Arctocephalus forsteri) feed on pelagic fish near the shelf break, and have breeding colonies on the Neptune Islands and Liguanea Island. Australian sea lions (Neophoca cinerea) have breeding colonies on Little Waldegrave Island, Olive Island, Seal Bay on Kangaroo Island, and Dangerous Reef in Spencer Gulf. The seasonal upwelling of nutrient-rich water along the western Eyre Peninsula and at the Kangaroo Island Pool nurtures plankton, krill, and fish, which provide food for dolphins, Australian little penguins (Eudyptula novaehollandiae), and blue whales (Balaenoptera musculus).
