= Central Eastern Shelf Province =

Marine bioregion in eastern Australia

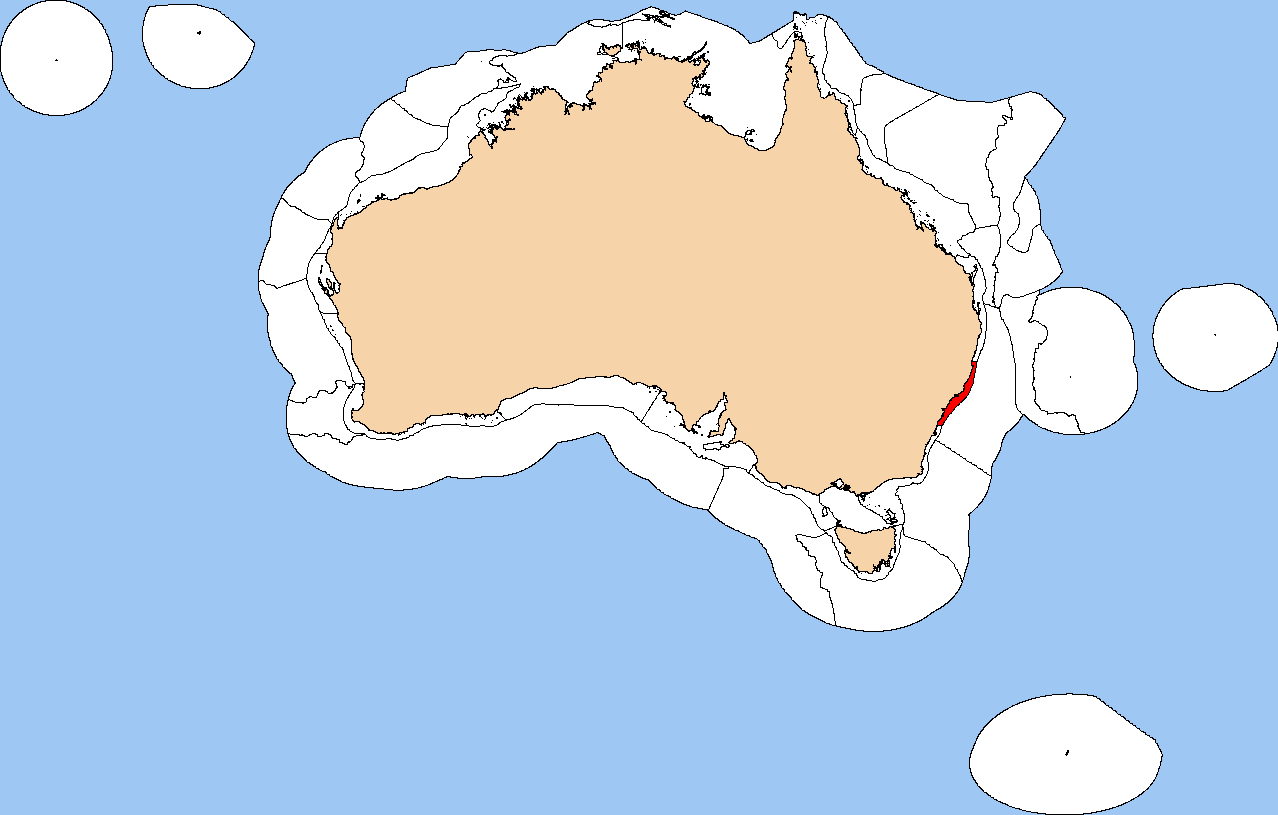
Map of the Central Eastern Shelf Province

The Central Eastern Shelf Province is a biogeographic region of Australia's coastal and continental shelf waters. It includes the warm temperate coastal waters of eastern Australia. It is a provincial level bioregion in the Integrated Marine and Coastal Regionalisation of Australia (IMCRA) system. It corresponds to the Manning-Hawkesbury marine ecoregion in the WWF's Marine Ecoregions of the World system.

== Geography ==
The Central Eastern Shelf Province extends along the eastern coast of Australia, from Coffs Harbour to south of Wollongong. In the east it extends to the edge of the continental shelf. On the north it adjoins the Central Eastern Shelf Transition, a transitional region between the warm temperate and tropical waters. On the south it adjoins the Southeast Shelf Transition region, the transition to the cool temperate waters of the Bass Strait and Tasmania.

The bioregion is influenced by the warm East Australian Current, which runs southwards from the tropics along the eastern coast of Australia.

=== Meso-scale bioregions ===
The province contains two meso-scale bioregions:

- Manning Shelf (MAN) extends from Stockton to north of Nambucca Heads.
- Hawkesbury Shelf (HAW) extends from Shellharbour to Stockton

== Ecology ==
The biota includes a distinct group of characteristic species, some of which range north and south into the adjacent transitional bioregions. It is the southern limit of some tropical species, and is the northeastern limit of a large group of southern temperate species which range as far as southwestern Australia.
