= Southwest Shelf Province =

Bioregion in Western Australia

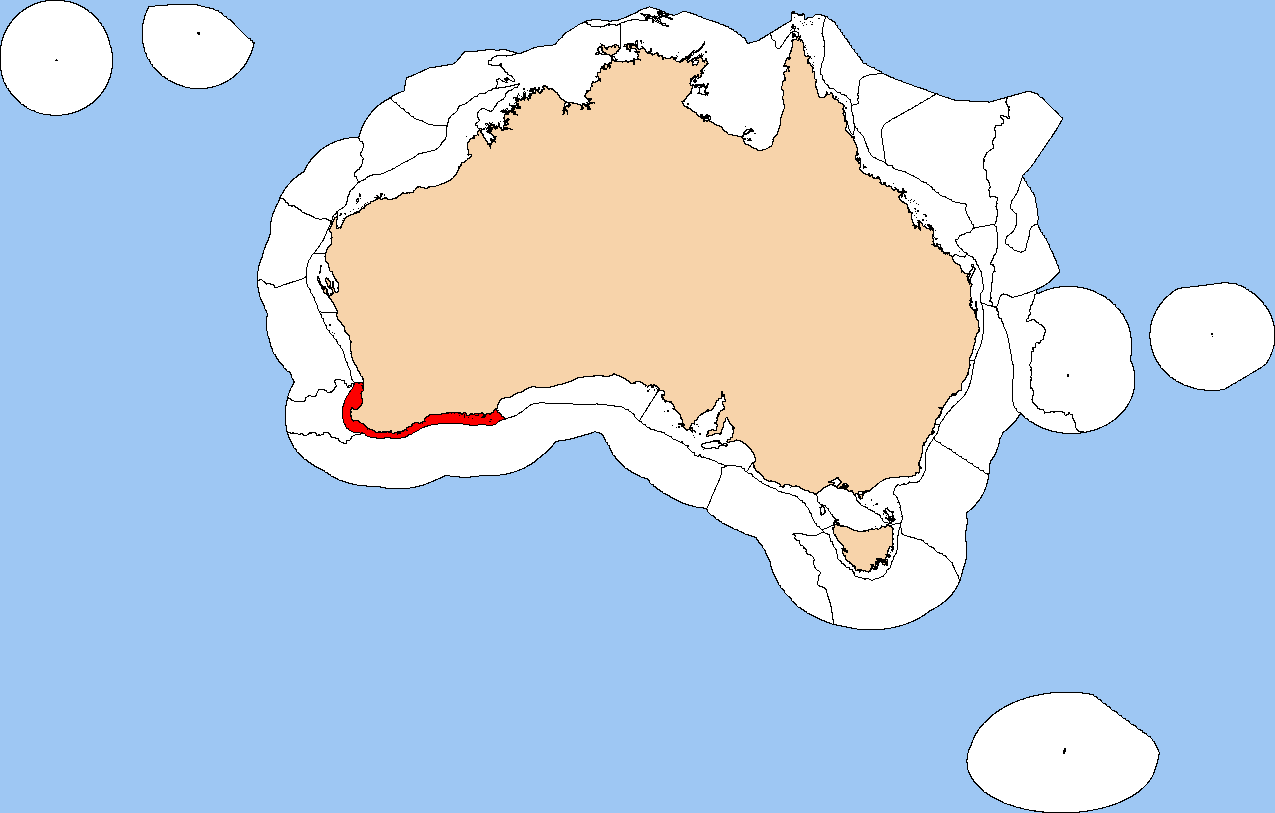
Map of the Southwest Shelf Province

The Southwest Shelf Province, also known as the Leeuwin marine ecoregion, is a biogeographic region of Australia's continental shelf. It includes the temperate coastal waters of Southwest Australia.

== Geography ==
The Southwest Shelf Province includes the coastal waters and continental shelf of south west Western Australia, extending from the vicinity of Perth on the west coast to Israelite Bay on the south coast.

The continental shelf is generally narrow, with some small offshore islets, including the Recherche Archipelago. The coastline is affected by heavy, high-energy swells. Rocky headlands of granitic, doleritic, or gneissic rock are found along much of the coast, interspersed with curving bays and sandy beaches. Seagrass meadows are found in sheltered bays and inlets.

The warm Leeuwin Current runs southwards along the west coast, and turns eastwards to follow the south coast. A colder inshore counter-current runs northwards along the west coast.

The Southwest Shelf Transition, or Houtman marine bioregion, lies to the north. The Great Australian Bight lies to the east.

== Meso-scale bioregions ==
The Integrated Marine and Coastal Regionalisation of Australia (IMCRA) identifies two meso-scale bioregions that make up the province.

- Leeuwin–Naturaliste (LNE) extends from Perth on the west coast to Black Head (near Wellstead) on the south coast.
- Western Australia South Coast (WSC) extends along the south coast from Black Head to Israelite Bay.
