= List of ecoregions in Mozambique =

The following is a list of ecoregions in Mozambique, as identified by the Worldwide Fund for Nature (WWF).

== Terrestrial ecoregions ==
by major habitat type

=== Tropical and subtropical moist broadleaf forests ===
- Maputaland coastal forest mosaic
- Southern Zanzibar-Inhambane coastal forest mosaic

=== Tropical and subtropical grasslands, savannas, and shrublands ===
- Eastern miombo woodlands
- Southern miombo woodlands
- Zambezian and mopane woodlands

=== Flooded grasslands and savannas ===
- Zambezian coastal flooded savanna
- Zambezian flooded grasslands
- Zambezian halophytics

=== Montane grasslands and shrublands ===
- Eastern Zimbabwe montane forest-grassland mosaic
- Maputaland-Pondoland bushland and thickets
- Southern Rift montane forest-grassland mosaic

=== Mangroves ===
- East African mangroves
- Southern Africa mangroves

== Freshwater ecoregions ==
by bioregion

=== Great Lakes ===
- Lake Malawi (Malawi, Mozambique, Tanzania)

=== Eastern and Coastal ===
- Eastern Coastal Basins (Mozambique, Tanzania)
- Lakes Chilwa and Chiuta (Malawi, Mozambique)

=== Zambezi ===
- Zambezian Lowveld (Mozambique, South Africa, Swaziland, Zimbabwe)
- Zambezi
  - Mulanje (Malawi, Mozambique)
  - Eastern Zimbabwe Highlands (Mozambique, Zimbabwe)
  - Zambezian (Plateau) Highveld (Zimbabwe)
  - Middle Zambezi Luangwa (Mozambique, Zambia, Zimbabwe)
  - Lower Zambezi (Malawi, Mozambique)

== Marine ecoregions ==
- Bight of Sofala/Swamp Coast
- Delagoa
- East African Coral Coast
