= List of ecoregions in South Africa =

The following is a list of ecoregions in South Africa, as identified by the Worldwide Fund for Nature (WWF).

== Terrestrial ecoregions ==
Listed by major habitat type

=== Tropical and subtropical moist broadleaf forests ===
- Knysna-Amatole montane forests – Ecoregion of the tropical and subtropical moist broadleaf forests biome in South Africa
- KwaZulu-Cape coastal forest mosaic – Subtropical moist broadleaf forest ecoregion of South Africa
- Maputaland coastal forest mosaic – Subtropical moist broadleaf forest ecoregion on the Indian Ocean coast of Southern Africa.
- Southern Zanzibar-Inhambane coastal forest mosaic – Tropical moist broadleaf forest ecoregion of eastern Africa

=== Tropical and subtropical grasslands, savannas, and shrublands ===
- Kalahari Acacia-Baikiaea woodlands – Ecoregion in Botswana, Namibia, South Africa and Zimbabwe
- Southern Africa bushveld – Sub-tropical woodland ecoregion of Southern Africa
- Zambezian and mopane woodlands – Tropical and subtropical grasslands, savannas, and shrublands ecoregion of southeastern Africa.

=== Montane grasslands and shrublands ===
- Drakensberg alti-montane grasslands and woodlands – High altitude ecoregion in South Africa
- Drakensberg montane grasslands, woodlands and forests – Mountain range in South Africa
- Highveld grasslands – Geographic region of the South African inland plateau
- Maputaland-Pondoland bushland and thickets – Montane shrubland ecoregion in South Africa

=== Mediterranean forests, woodlands, and scrub ===
- Albany thickets – Afrotropic terrestrial ecoregion of dense woodland in South Africa
- Lowland fynbos and renosterveld – Shrubland and heathland ecoregion of southwestern South Africa
- Montane fynbos and renosterveld – Shrubland and heathland ecoregion of southwestern South Africa

=== Deserts and xeric shrublands ===
- Kalahari xeric savanna – Semi-arid sandy savanna ecoregion in Southern Africa
- Nama Karoo – Xeric shrubland ecoregion on the central plateau of South Africa and Namibia
- Succulent Karoo – Desert ecoregion of South Africa and Namibia

=== Tundra ===
- Southern Indian Ocean Islands tundra – Ecoregion of several subantarctic islands in the southern Indian Ocean

=== Mangroves ===
- Southern Africa mangroves – Ecoregion of mangrove swamps in rivers and estuaries on the eastern coast of South Africa

== Freshwater ecoregions ==
by bioregion

=== Zambezi ===
- Kalahari – Semi-arid sandy savanna in Southern Africa
- Zambezian Lowveld

=== Southern Temperate ===
- Amatole-Winterberg Highlands
- Cape Fold
- Drakensberg-Maloti Highlands
- Karoo
- Southern Kalahari
- Southern Temperate Highveld
- Western Orange

== Marine ecoregions ==
- Benguela ecoregion – Ecoregion off the coast of South Africa
- Agulhas ecoregion – Ecoregion off the coast of South Africa
- Natal ecoregion – Marine ecoregion on the eastern coast of South Africa
- Delagoa ecoregion – Marine ecoregion on the eastern coast of southern Africa
- Prince Edward Islands – Two small subantarctic islands belonging to South Africa
