= Zambezian coastal flooded savanna =

Terrestrial ecoregion in Mozambique

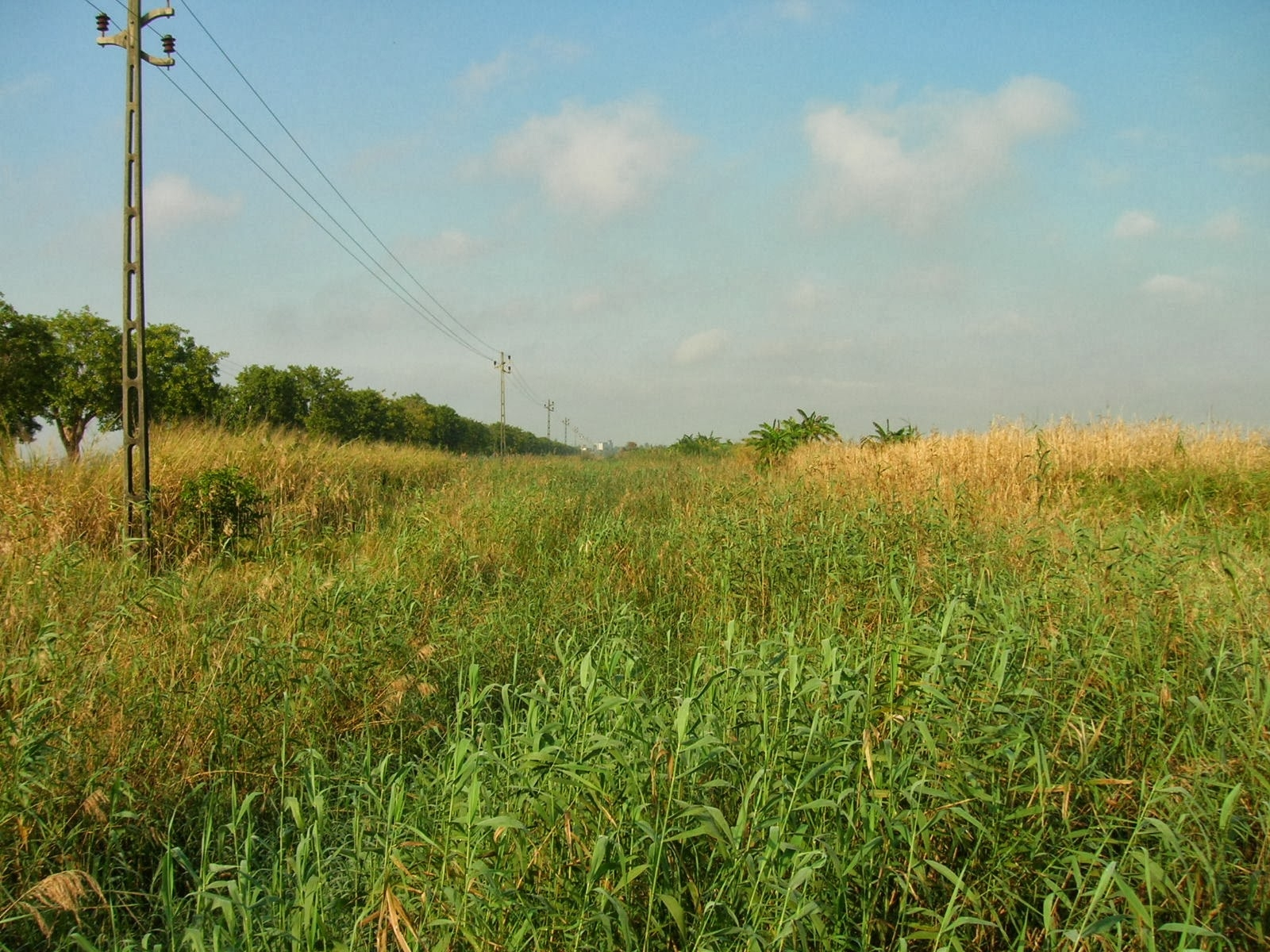
- Reed swamp in Beira, Mozambique

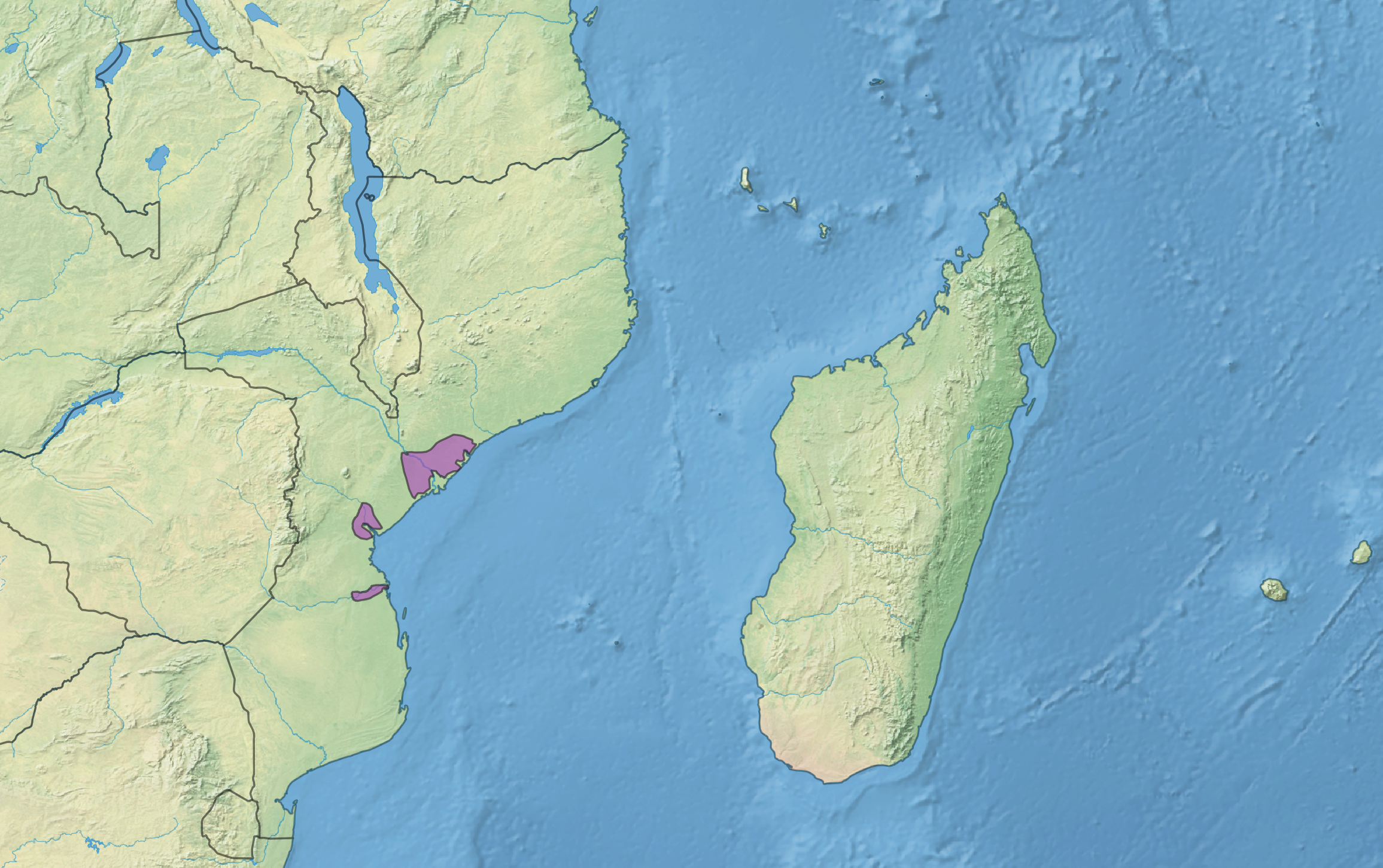
- Map of the Zambezian coastal flooded savanna

Ecology
- Realm: Afrotropical
- Biome: flooded grasslands and savannas
- Borders: List: East African mangroves; Eastern miombo woodlands; Southern miombo woodlands; Southern Zanzibar-Inhambane coastal forest mosaic; Zambezian and mopane woodlands

Geography
- Area: 19,346 km^{2} (7,470 sq mi)
- Countries: Mozambique

Conservation
- Protected: 6,212 km² (32%)

The Zambezian coastal flooded savanna is a flooded grasslands and savannas ecoregion in Mozambique. It includes the coastal flooded savannas and grasslands in the deltas of the Zambezi, Pungwe, Buzi, and Save rivers.

== Geography ==
The Zambezi, Pungwe, Buzi, and Save rivers drain extensive areas of interior Southeast Africa. Rainfall in the region is highly seasonal, and the volume of water carried by these rivers varied with the wet and dry cycles of the year. The flooded savannas are found in low-lying coastal lowlands at the river mouths, on deposits of recent fluvisols deposited by the rivers.

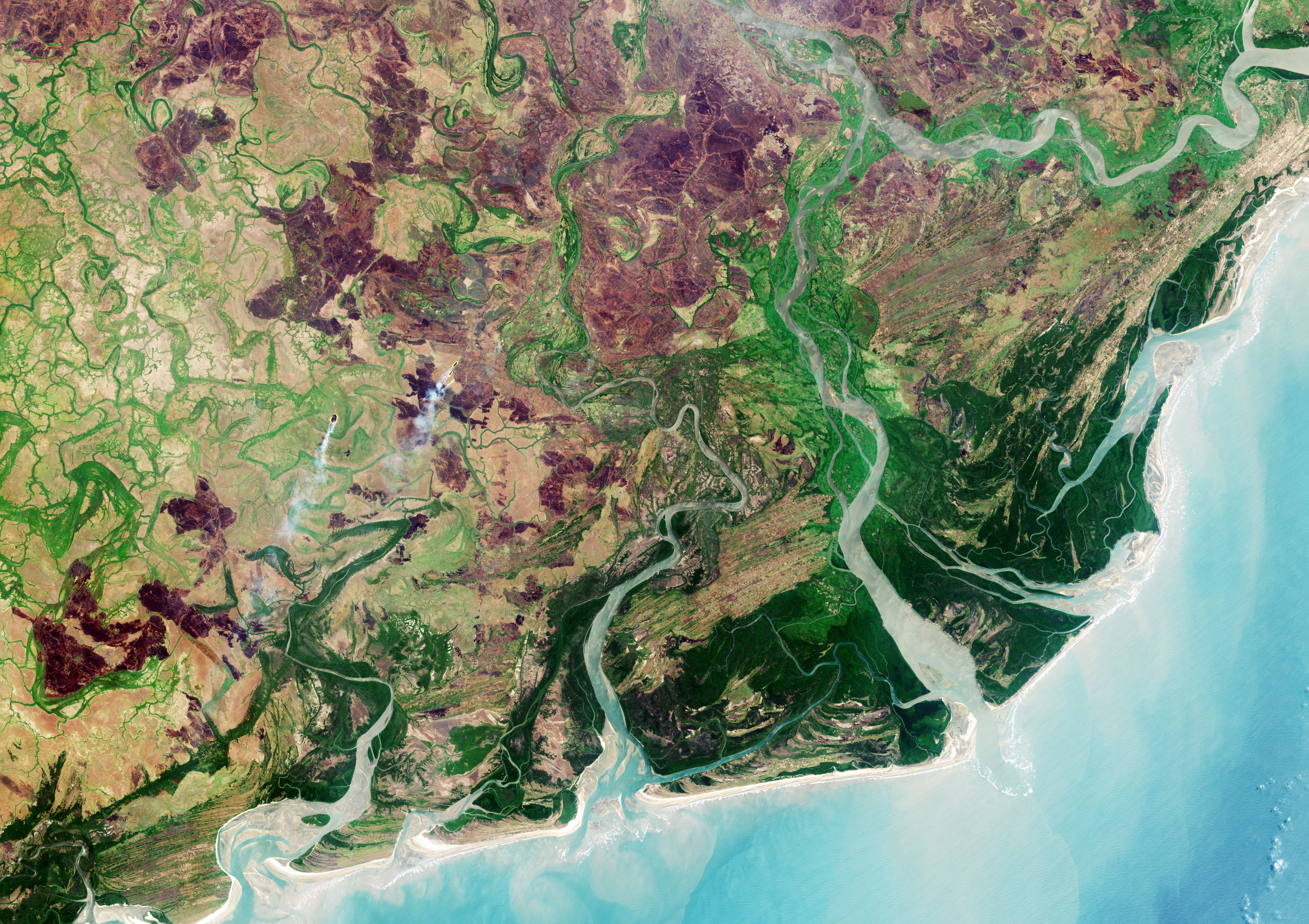
Zambezi Delta diversity

They Zambezian coastal flooded savannas cover an area of 19,346 km². The Zambezi flooded savannas cover the largest area, extending nearly 200 km along the Indian Ocean coast and extending up to 120 km inland. To the south are the adjoining floodplains of the Pungwe and Buzi, which create a flooded savanna of 4500 km². The smaller Save River flooded savannas lie further to the south. The East African mangroves lie between the flooded savannas and the coast in areas of brackish or salt water.

The Southern Zanzibar-Inhambane coastal forest mosaic ecoregion occupies the coastal uplands adjacent to the flooded savannas. The drier Zambezian and mopane woodlands occupy the inland river valleys.

== Flora ==
The plant communities include flooded grasslands, flooded savannas, and freshwater swamp forests, which vary with soils and the duration of flooding. Reed swamps of Phragmites australis and Typha capensis are common in permanently-flooded areas. The grasses Hyparrhenia, Ischaemum, and Setaria predominate in seasonally-flooded areas with clay soil. Trees and shrubs of the flooded savannas include Parinari curatellifolia, Uapaca nitida, and Syzygium guineense. There are areas of Borassus aethiopum palm savanna. Swamp forests grow at the edges of rivers, lakes, and lagoons, and characteristic trees include Barringtonia racemosa, Ficus verruculosa, and the palm Phoenix reclinata.

== Fauna ==
Large mammals in the ecoregion include hippo (Hippopotamus amphibius), African buffalo (Syncerus caffer caffer), waterbuck (Kobus ellipsiprymnus), southern reedbuck (Redunca arundium), plains zebra (Equus quagga), Nyala (Tragelaphus angasi), blue wildebeest (Connochaetes taurinus), steenbok (Raphicerus campestris), and common warthog (Phacochoerus africanus). Mammal predators include the lion (Panthera leo), leopard (P. pardus), cheetah (Acinonyx jubatus), spotted hyena (Crocuta crocuta), side-striped jackal (Canis adustus), Cape genet (Genetta tigrina), African civet (Civettictis civetta), serval (Leptailurus serval), African clawless otter (Aonyx capensis), spotted-necked otter (Hydrictis maculicollis), banded mongoose (Mungos mungo), white-tailed mongoose (Ichneumia albicauda), and bushy-tailed mongoose (Bdeogale crassicauda).

Some large mammals migrate seasonally between the flooded savannas and the grasslands, forests, and woodlands of the neighboring uplands. Common eland (Taurotragus oryx) migrates to the seasonal wetlands at the start of the rainy season to browse on the young grasses. Populations of Lichtenstein’s hartebeest (Alcelaphus lichtensteinii) and sable antelope (Hippotragus niger) live in the flooded savannas during the dry season, and migrate to the uplands at the start of the rainy season.

The flooded savannas are home to large populations of resident and migratory water birds, including African openbill stork (Anastomus lamelligerus), saddle-billed stork (Ephippiorhynchus senegalensis), lesser flamingo (Phoeniconaias minor), great white pelican (Pelecanus onocrotalus), great snipe (Gallinago media), and African skimmer (Rynchops flavirostris).

== Conservation and threats ==
The construction of large dams on the Zambezi – Kariba Dam, completed in 1959, and Cahora Bassa Dam, completed in 1974 – altered the ecology of the Zambezi, reducing the annual wet-season flooding of the lower Zambezi and the overall volume of both water and sediment coming into the flooded savannas. Other threats include poaching and over-hunting. Wildlife was decimated during the Mozambican Civil War, and the African bush elephant (Loxodonta africana) and black rhinoceros (Diceros bicornis) were extirpated.

== Protected areas ==
A 2017 assessment found that 6,212 km², or 32%, of the ecoregion is in protected areas. Protected areas include Marromeu National Reserve in the southwestern Zambezi delta, and the adjacent coutadas or hunting areas. Gorongosa National Park protects a portion of the northern Pungwe floodplain.
