= Bight of Sofala/Swamp Coast =

Marine ecoregion in Mozambique

Ecology
- Realm: Western Indo-Pacific
- Province: Western Indian Ocean
- Borders (marine): East African coral coast, Delagoa
- Borders (mangrove): East African mangroves

Geography
- Country: Mozambique
- Province: Nampula; Zambezia; Sofala; Inhambane
- Oceans or seas: Indian Ocean
- Physical features: Mozambique Channel, Bight of Sofala, Primeiras and Segundas Archipelago
- Coastal features: fringing reef, mangrove
- Currents: Mozambique Current
- Rivers: Zambezi, Pungwe, Save

The Bight of Sofala/Swamp Coast is a marine ecoregion along the eastern coast of Africa, characterized by extensive mangrove swamps and coastal wetlands. It extends along the coast of Mozambique, from Angoche (16°14' S) to the Bazaruto Archipelago (21°14’ S). It adjoins the East African coral coast ecoregion to the north, and the Delagoa ecoregion to the south.

== Geography ==
The Bight of Sofala, also known as Sofala Bay, is a large indentation on the African coast. The continental shelf is wide in the region, reaching up to 140 km near Beira, in contrast with the narrower continental shelves to the north and south. The concave coastline and shallow seas create high-amplitude tides.

The Mozambique Current runs generally southward along the coast, and eddy currents form in coastal indentations like the Sofala Bight.

== Habitat types ==
24 rivers empty into the ocean in this region, which supports extensive mangroves, coastal swamps, and tidal estuaries. The Zambezi, Pungwe, and Save rivers form large river deltas, and numerous smaller rivers support coastal estuaries, mangroves, and estuaries. The waters are turbid with fine river sediments. The salinity of coastal waters varies seasonally as river discharge rises and falls, from 20 ppt in the rainy season to 34 ppt in the dry season.

== Fauna ==
The extensive mangrove forests and coastal wetlands are important habitat for waterbirds, with over 73 species present.

The turbid waters of the region, along with occasional cold-water upwelling, limits the growth of corals in the region.

== Human use ==
The Sofala Bank is a productive fishery, particularly for Indian prawns (Fenneropenaeus indicus).

Large dams on the Zambezi – Kariba Dam, completed in 1959, and Cahora Bassa, completed in 1975 – have altered freshwater, sediment, and nutrient flows into the Zambezi Delta and Sofala Bight. Large seasonal floods have been reduced, and sediments and nutrients formerly carried to the sea by floodwaters are now trapped behind dams.

The productivity of the Sofala Bight prawn harvest decreased continually from the 1970s through the 1990s, from 90kg per hour in 1977 to 30kg per hour by the early 2000s. The productivity continued to decrease from 2000 to 2014, and the region also saw a decline the total harvest of prawns and other food fish during the same period.

== Protected areas ==
Marine protected areas include:

- Marromeu National Reserve and other game reserves (coutadas) in the Zambezi delta
- Primeiras and Segundas Islands Environmental Protected Area extends into the northern portion of the ecoregion.
