= Western Indo-Pacific =

Biogeographic region of the Earth's seas

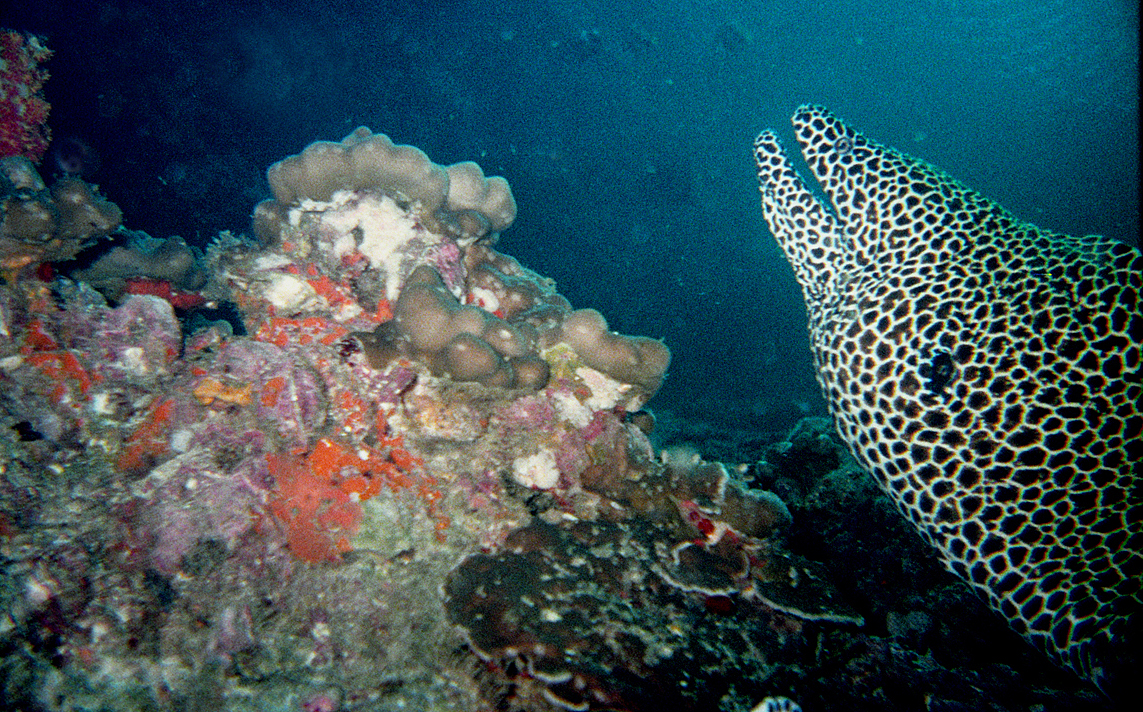
Marine life off the coast of Al Batinah, Oman

The Western Indo-Pacific is a biogeographic region of the Earth's seas, comprising the tropical waters of the eastern and central Indian Ocean. It is part of the larger Indo-Pacific, which includes the tropical Indian Ocean, the western and central Pacific Ocean, and the seas connecting the two in the general area of Indonesia. The Western Indo-Pacific may be classified as a marine realm, one of the great biogeographic divisions of the world's ocean basins, or as a subrealm of the Indo-Pacific.

The Western Indo-Pacific realm covers the western and central portion of the Indian Ocean, including Africa's east coast, the Red Sea, Gulf of Aden, Persian Gulf, Arabian Sea, Bay of Bengal, and Andaman Sea, as well as the coastal waters surrounding Madagascar, the Seychelles, Comoros, Mascarene Islands, Maldives, and Chagos Archipelago.

The transition between the Western Indo-Pacific and Central Indo-Pacific occurs at the Strait of Malacca and in southern Sumatra.

The Western Indo-Pacific does not include the temperate and polar waters of the Indian Ocean, which are part of separate marine realms. The boundary between the Western Indo-Pacific and Temperate Southern Africa marine realms lies in South Africa near the border with Mozambique, where the southernmost mangroves and tropical corals are found.

== Subdivisions ==
The Western Indo-Pacific is further subdivided into marine provinces, and the marine provinces divided into marine ecoregions:

=== Red Sea and Gulf of Aden ===
- Northern and Central Red Sea
- Southern Red Sea
- Gulf of Aden

=== Somali/Arabian ===
- Persian Gulf
- Gulf of Oman
- Western Arabian Sea
- Central Somali Coast

=== Western Indian Ocean ===
- Northern Monsoon Current Coast
- East African Coral Coast
- Seychelles
- Cargados Carajos/Tromelin Island
- Mascarene Islands
- Southeast Madagascar
- Western and Northern Madagascar
- Bight of Sofala/Swamp Coast
- Delagoa

=== West and South Indian Shelf ===
- Western India
- South India and Sri Lanka

=== Central Indian Ocean Islands ===
- Maldives
- Chagos

=== Bay of Bengal ===
- Eastern India
- Northern Bay of Bengal

=== Andaman ===
- Andaman and Nicobar Islands
- Andaman Sea Coral Coast
- Northern Sumatran Coast

=== Eastern Indian Ocean ===
- Western Sumatran Coast
- Sunda Strait
- Java Sea
- Southern Javan Coast
- Flores Sea
- Savu Sea
- Timor Sea
- Western Australian Coast
