= Northern Monsoon Current Coast =

The Northern Monsoon Current coast is a marine ecoregion along the eastern coast of Africa. It extends along a portion of the coasts of Somalia and Kenya, from south of Lamu in Kenya (2º30' S) to north of Mogadishu in Somalia (2°15' N). It adjoins the Central Somali coast ecoregion to the north, and the East African coral coast ecoregion to the south.

== Major habitat types ==
Patch coral reefs occur around Kiunga on Kenya's northern coast, and along the southern Somali coast. Cool water upwelling along the coast limits the development of coral reefs, and they are not as well developed as those in the East African coral coast further south.

The Lamu Archipelago has extensive mangroves, covering approximately 32,000 ha – nearly 70% of Kenya's mangrove area.

== Fauna ==
Green sea turtles (Chelonia mydas) once nested in the thousands along Somalia's beaches, but their current status is unknown. Hawksbill sea turtles (Eretmochelys imbricata), olive ridley sea turtles (Lepidochelys olivacea), leatherback sea turtles (Dermochelys coriacea), and loggerhead sea turtles (Caretta caretta) inhabit coastal waters, but whether they nest in the region is unknown. Dugongs (Dugong dugon) inhabited seagrass meadows along the Somali coast, but their current status is unknown.

The Bajuni Islands off the southern Somali coast are home to seabird colonies.

== Human use ==
Spiny lobsters – chiefly Palinurus ornatus, and also P. versicolor and P. longipes – are the most lucrative catch in both the Kenyan and Somali portions of the region. Foreign vessels trawl Somali waters at depths of 150–400 m. for two species of deep-water whip lobsters, Puerulus sewelli and Puerulus carinatus. Lobsters are mostly exported to the Middle East. Sharks are fished for their fins, which are exported to Asia.

== Threats ==
In Kenya, Over-fishing and exploitation of seashells, corals, turtle shells, for tourist souvenirs are diminishing marine fauna. Reefs are being destroyed by dynamite fishing, and mining of coral reefs for lime and construction materials. Bottom trawling for fish damages seagrass beds.

Somalia has lacked an effective government for decades. Fishing and other marine activities are unregulated, while research and monitoring is non-existent or extremely limited.

== Protected areas ==
- Kiunga Marine National Reserve, Kenya
- Boni National Reserve, Kenya
- Lag Badana National Park, Somalia
