= African coral reefs =

Coral reefs in Africa

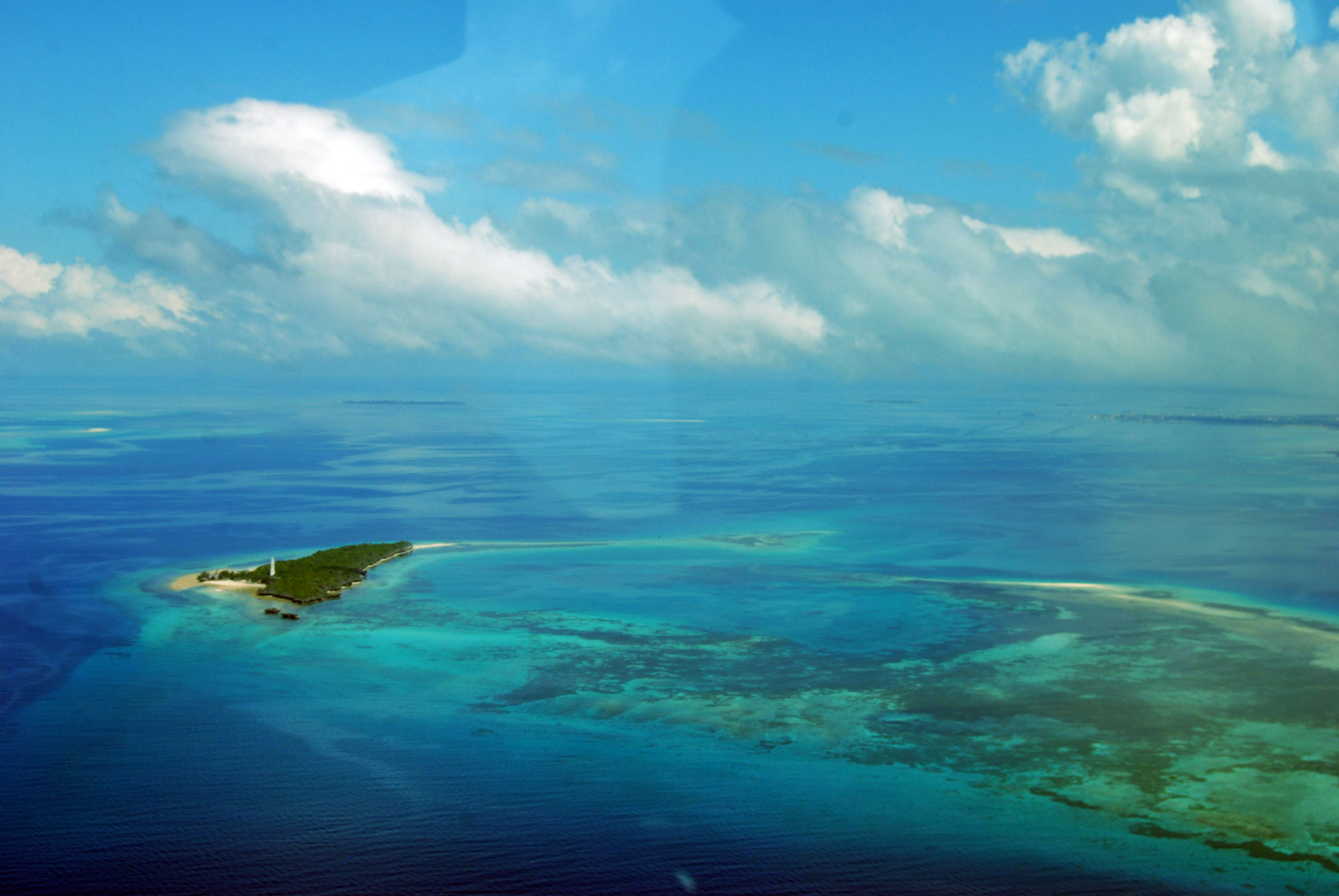
Chumbe Island coral park, Zanzibar

Underwater video of coral reefs in Malindi Marine National Park, Kenya

African coral reefs are the coral reefs which are present in Africa. Most are found along the eastern and southern coasts of Africa. The east coast corals extend from the Red Sea to Madagascar in the south, and are an important resource for the fishersmen of Kenya, Tanzania, Mozambique and Madagascar. Some cold-water reefs are also found along the northwestern part of Africa, i.e. near the Azores, Madeira, Canary Islands and Cape Verde

== Western African reefs ==
In some of the western African reefs (Azores, Canary Islands, Madeira) there is a trawling ban in place (initially set by EU's Regulation (EC) No 2287/2003

== Eastern and Southern African reefs ==
As with coral reefs elsewhere, African coral reefs are more biologically diverse than the surrounding ocean, and support species such as the mantis shrimp, potato grouper, humphead wrasse and maxima clam, as well as many seaweeds and corals.

On the east coast, temperatures average about 26 °C (79 °F) over the year. The average rainfall is highest between January and April, at about 300 millimetres (12 in), and lowest during August to November, at about 100 millimetres (3.9 in).

There are multiple threats to the reefs, such a tourist diving and damaging the corals, or taking samples. Then there are industrial run-offs and pollutants, untreated sewage and the increasing sediment flows in rivers that threaten all of the coastal ecosystems. The reef is also threatened by climate change. Due to global warming, the sea surface temperature increases and in 1997/98 a particularly severe 'El Nino' killed 90 percent of corals on the reef. The CORDIO (COral Reef Degradation in the Indian Ocean) NGO have set up an East African task force to monitor the reef's management.

== See also ==
- List of reefs
- East African coral coast
