= Marine ecoregions of the South African exclusive economic zone =

Geographical regions of similar ecological characteristics

Marine ecoregions of the South African exclusive economic zone (2011 to 2018)

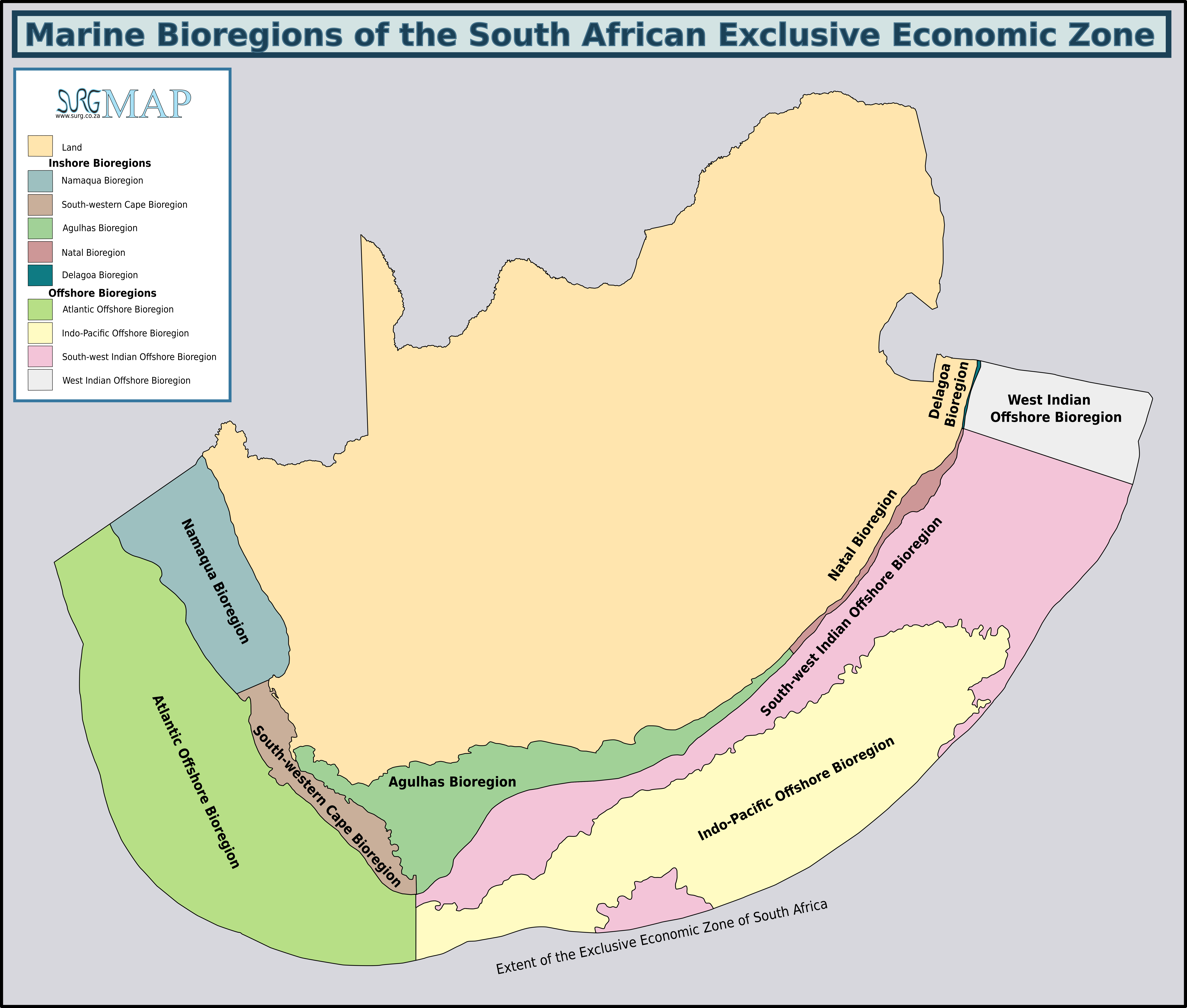
Marine bioregions of the South African exclusive economic zone (2004 to 2011)

The marine ecoregions of the South African exclusive economic zone are a set of geographically delineated regions of similar ecological characteristics on a fairly broad scale, covering the exclusive economic zone along the South African coast.

There were originally five inshore bioregions defined over the continental shelf and four offshore bioregions covering the continental slope and abyssal regions. These bioregions were used for conservation research and planning. They were defined in the South African National Spatial Biodiversity Assessment of 2004.

The South African National Spatial Biodiversity Assessment of 2011 amended this to reduce the number of regions to four inshore and two offshore and rename them as ecoregions.

== The exclusive economic zone ==
Maritime Zones under International Law

An exclusive economic zone (EEZ) is a sea zone prescribed by the United Nations Convention on the Law of the Sea over which a state has special rights regarding the exploration and use of marine resources, including energy production from water and wind. It stretches from the baseline out to 200 nautical miles (nmi) from its coast. The term does not generally include either the territorial sea or the continental shelf beyond the 200 nmi limit. but in this context territorial waters are included. The difference between the territorial sea and the exclusive economic zone is that the first confers full sovereignty over the waters, whereas the second is merely a "sovereign right" which refers to the coastal state's rights below the surface of the sea. The surface waters of the EEZ beyond territorial waters are international waters.

== History ==
The first mapping of South African marine habitats was done in a series of workshops led by the NSBA marine team culminating in a marine biodiversity assessment report in of the South African National Spatial Biodiversity Assessment of 2004. This indicated 34 marine biozones extending from the supratidal zone to the border of the exclusive economic zone. They allow for future refinement where necessary. Nine South African marine bioregions were defined in the South African National Spatial Biodiversity Assessment (NSBA) 2004.

The five inshore bioregions of 2004 were consolidated to four in the 2011 assessment. The Namaqua and southwestern Cape inshore bioregions became the southern Benguela shelf ecoregion. Similarly the Indo-Pacific offshore bioregion, the South-west Indian offshore bioregion, and the West Indian offshore bioregion were combined to become the Southwest Indian ecoregion, reducing the four offshore bioregions to two deepsea ecoregions. The other bioregions were renamed to ecoregions. The resulting regions are: Benguela, Agulhas, Natal, and Delagoa ecoregions, which include the coast, continental shelf and shelf edge, and the Southeast Atlantic and Southwest Indian ecoregions include the upper and lower continental slope and abyssal regions.

== The regions ==
=== Depth zones ===
The regions are divided into benthic depth zones. Along the coastline there are supratidal, above the high-water mark, intertidal between high and low water, shallow photic, or subtidal shoreface, where there is turbulence and enough light for seaweeds to flourish, down to about 10 m, deep photic, where there is less light, down to about 30 m, and sub-photic (lightless) zones, down to the edge of the continental shelf, which varies from about 400 m in the northern part of the west coast, to 200 m in the Agulhas region, 100 m off Natal, and can be shallow as 50 m in the Delagoa bioregion. The shelf break is defined by the slope angle of the seabed. The offshore regions include upper slope, from the shelf break down to about 1800 m, lower slope, and abyss, below 3500 m. The end boundaries of the supratidal zone do not generally coincide with the bioregion boundaries.

=== Inshore regions ===
Five inshore marine bioregions that extend from the shoreline to the break of the continental shelf were defined. Boundaries between them are difficult to define, and overlaps between regions are accepted, because available species data may indicate large sections of coast with few endemics, and many species are found spread across more than one region.

==== West coast ====
Benguela ecoregion
This is the region comprising the consolidated Namaqua and South-western Cape bioregions.

Namaqua bioregion
This is a cool temperate region between Sylvia Hill just north of Lüderitz in Namibia to Cape Columbine. Sylvia Hill is the northern boundary of a large upwelling cell. The bioregion has large-scale intensive upwelling and nutrient rich water, and the cold Benguela current. The region is known for low oxygen events and it contains extensive mud banks and a relatively wide continental shelf. It is a productive bioregion and supports major commercial fisheries. In the 2011 assessment it was combined with the South-western Cape bioregion to form the Benguela ecoregion.

South-western Cape region
This region has a relatively narrow continental shelf. There is a change in geology at Cape Columbine which marks the northern extent of the exposed granite, and there is less offshore mud habitat south of this break. This region includes the two underwater canyons, Cape Point Valley and Cape Canyon, and there are large areas of rocky reef. The change in biology at Cape Columbine is indicated by change in seaweed and intertidal communities. There is less tendency for oxygen deficient bottom water than in the area further north. This region supports trawl and longline fisheries for hake, pelagic fisheries for anchovy, pilchard and roundherring, and a longline shark fishery. The break at the south-eastern end of the region is at Cape Point, where it is distinct in the inshore and tidal habitats, but the change in deeper water tends obliquely to the south-east, and is more diffuse, due to mixing of the Benguela and Agulhas currents between these regions. In the 2011 assessment it was combined with the Namaqua bioregion to form the Benguela ecoregion.

==== South coast ====
Agulhas region
The region from Cape Point to the Mbashe river is known as the Agulhas bioregion. The south coast comprises a warm temperate component from Mbashe to Cape Agulhas, and a large overlap zone between Cape Agulhas and Cape Point where waters of the two currents mix. The continental shelf is at its widest in this region, extending up to 240km offshore on the Agulhas Bank. The shelf edge includes areas of extensive slumping. There are several areas of reef on the Agulhas Bank, including the Alphard banks. This region has the highest number of South African endemics, and is a breeding area for many species. There are several important commercial fisheries including squid, horse mackerel, shark, and lobster. It was renamed to Agulhas ecoregion in the 2011 assessment.

==== East coast ====
Natal region
The Natal bioregion, from the Mbashe River in the south-west to Cape Vidal in the north, is characterised by a narrow continental shelf, with widths ranging from less than five km to a maximum of 50 km off the Tugela bank. This region has high riverine input and includes the Thukela river, which is the largest river system in KwaZulu-Natal. The oceanographic driving force of this bioregion is the Agulhas Current, with strong influence north of Cape St Lucia and south of Port Shepstone where the shelf is narrowest. In the Natal bight, south of Cape St Lucia, where the coastline is more distant from the shelf edge, there is a dynamically driven upwelling cell which is an important source of nutrients for the Tugela Bank. A cyclonic eddy near Durban sometimes causes a northward current to flow between Aliwal Shoal and Ballito. The submarine canyons in the Natal bioregion include the Tugela and Goodlad canyons in the north and several others between Port Shepstone and Port St Johns. Reefs occur mainly in the southern and central areas within this bioregion and there is an important deep reef complex along most of this coastline. A commercial line fishery largely based on surf-launched vessels is important in this region, and the annual sardine run occurs in the southern coastal waters. Limited reef habitat is represented by the major complexes at Protea banks and Aliwal shoal. Biological communities of the rocky reefs in this region are different from the coral communities further north, as reef-building Indo-Pacific corals decline with the increased turbidity in the southern waters and are replaced by endemic soft corals. There are major estuarine systems including Durban Bay, Richards Bay and the St Lucia system, and the Tugela mud banks are the only mud belt on the east coast, with unique biotic assemblages. They support prawn fisheries offshore and are nursery areas for elasmobranchs and bony fish. It was renamed to Natal ecoregion in the 2011 assessment.

Delagoa region
The Delagoa bioregion from Inhaca to Cape Vidal has a narrow continental shelf, a shallow steep shelf break and a large number of submarine canyons. The warm Agulhas current is a dominant feature. It flows strongly southward along the shelf. There is little riverine inflow, so the water remains clear and the reefs are colonised by scleractinian corals. The sediments are medium to fine grained sands and carbonate rich gravel and rubble. Nesting beaches of leatherback and loggerhead turtles can be found. The coastline includes occasional bays with rocky headlands, and long sandy beaches. There are no commercial fisheries in the South African part of this bioregion. It was renamed to Delagoa ecoregion in the 2011 assessment.

=== Offshore ===
A further four offshore bioregions extending from the break of the continental shelf to the border of the EEZ were defined in the 2004 assessment.

The offshore bioregions were defined based on the assumption that the marine biota of the deeper waters is more homogeneous than on the continental shelf, as the deeper water has more consistent temperature. This results in a smaller number of offshore bioregions. In most cases the boundary between bioregions was chosen as a straight line perpendicular to the coast, except for the break at Cape Point, which runs due south to the 30 m isobath then follows the 150 m isobath to 21°East. This approximates the line of the mixing zone between the Benguela and Agulhas currents, which separates their fish communities. This line divides the Agulhas bank into a western part which is considered part of the South-western Cape bioregion, and an eastern part which is in the Agulhas bioregion. The Cape Point break is extended south over the shelf break, down to the abyss and to the border of the EEZ. The region to the west of this break is the Atlantic Offshore bioregion, which is offshore of both the Namaqua and South-western Cape inshore regions. To the east of this break, the West Indian offshore bioregion comprises the upper and lower continental slope as far north-east as the Cape Vidal break. The abyssal region below this part of the slope is designated as the Indo-Pacific offshore bioregion. North of the Cape Vidal break, the slope is designated as the South-west Indian offshore bioregion. There is no abyssal region within the EEZ this far north. The three offshore bioregions east of Cape Agulhas were combined in the 2011 assessment.

== Habitat types ==
The following marine habitat types have been identified as ecologically distinct.

- Agulhas boulder shore
- Agulhas canyon
- Agulhas dissipative sandy coast
- Agulhas dissipative-intermediate sandy coast
- Agulhas estuarine shore
- Agulhas exposed rocky coast
- Agulhas gravel inner shelf
- Agulhas gravel outer shelf
- Agulhas gravel shelf edge
- Agulhas hard inner shelf
- Agulhas hard outer shelf
- Agulhas hard shelf edge
- Agulhas inshore gravel
- Agulhas inshore hard grounds
- Agulhas inshore reef
- Agulhas intermediate sandy coast
- Agulhas island
- Agulhas mixed sediment inner shelf
- Agulhas mixed sediment outer shelf
- Agulhas mixed shore
- Agulhas muddy inner shelf
- Agulhas muddy outer shelf
- Agulhas muddy shelf edge
- Agulhas outer shelf reef
- Agulhas reflective sandy coast
- Agulhas sandy inner shelf
- Agulhas sandy inshore
- Agulhas sandy outer shelf
- Agulhas sandy shelf edge
- Agulhas shelf edge reef
- Agulhas sheltered rocky coast
- Agulhas very exposed rocky coast
- Delagoa canyon
- Delagoa inshore reef
- Delagoa mixed shore
- Delagoa sandy inshore
- Delagoa sandy shelf
- Delagoa sandy shelf edge
- Delagoa shelf edge reef
- Delagoa shelf reef
- Delagoa very exposed rocky coast
- Harbour
- Namaqua boulder shore
- Namaqua exposed rocky coast
- Namaqua hard inner shelf
- Namaqua inner shelf reef
- Namaqua inshore hard grounds
- Namaqua inshore reef
- Namaqua island
- Namaqua mixed shore
- Namaqua muddy inner shelf
- Namaqua muddy inshore
- Namaqua sandy inner shelf
- Namaqua sandy inshore
- Namaqua sheltered rocky coast
- Namaqua very exposed rocky coast
- Natal boulder shore
- Natal canyon
- Natal estuarine shore
- Natal exposed rocky coast
- Natal gravel shelf
- Natal gravel shelf edge
- Natal inshore gravel
- Natal inshore reef
- Natal mixed sediment shelf
- Natal mixed sediment shelf edge
- Natal mixed shore
- Natal muddy inshore
- Natal muddy shelf
- Natal muddy shelf edge
- Natal sandy inshore
- Natal sandy shelf
- Natal sandy shelf edge
- Natal shelf edge
- Natal shelf edge reef
- Natal very exposed rocky coast
- Natal-Delagoa dissipative sandy coast
- Natal-Delagoa dissipative-intermediate sandy coast
- Natal-Delagoa estuarine shore
- Natal-Delagoa intermediate sandy coast
- Natal-Delagoa reflective sandy coast
- South Atlantic abyss
- South Atlantic abyss with ferro-manganese deposits
- South Atlantic lower bathyal
- South Atlantic upper bathyal
- Southeast Atlantic seamounts
- Southern Benguela canyon
- Southern Benguela carbonate mound
- Southern Benguela dissipative sandy coast
- Southern Benguela dissipative-intermediate sandy coast
- Southern Benguela estuarine shore
- Southern Benguela gravel outer shelf
- Southern Benguela gravel shelf edge
- Southern Benguela hard outer shelf
- Southern Benguela hard shelf edge
- Southern Benguela intermediate sandy coast
- Southern Benguela muddy outer shelf
- Southern Benguela muddy shelf edge
- Southern Benguela outer shelf reef
- Southern Benguela reflective sandy coast
- Southern Benguela sandy outer shelf
- Southern Benguela sandy shelf edge
- Southwest Indian abyss
- Southwest Indian abyss with ferro-manganese deposits
- Southwest Indian lower bathyal
- Southwest Indian lower bathyal with ferro-manganese deposits
- Southwest Indian seamounts
- Southwest Indian upper bathyal
- Southwestern Cape boulder shore
- Southwestern Cape exposed rocky coast
- Southwestern Cape hard inner shelf
- Southwestern Cape inshore hard grounds
- Southwestern Cape inshore reef
- Southwestern Cape island
- Southwestern Cape lagoon
- Southwestern Cape mixed shore
- Southwestern Cape sandy inner shelf
- Southwestern Cape sandy inshore
- Southwestern Cape sheltered rocky coast
- Southwestern Cape very exposed rocky coast

The classification of South African marine and coastal habitat types takes connectivity, depth and slope, substrate geology and sediment grain size, shoreline wave exposure, and biogeography into account. Beach state considers the wave exposure and grain size. 136 habitat types are identified. The categories and number of types of habitat identified in each category are:

- 37 coastal habitat types:
  - 16 types of rocky coast
  - 5 types of mixed coast
  - 16 types of sandy coast
- 1 type of lagoon
- 3 types of island
- 17 inshore habitat types in the 5 to 30 m depth range:
  - 8 types of rocky inshore benthos
  - 9 types of unconsolidated sedimentary inshore benthos
- 62 offshore benthic habitat types deeper than 30 m:
  - 12 types of rocky continental shelf benthos
  - 19 types of unconsolidated continental shelf
  - 9 types of rocky continental shelf edge
  - 11 types of unconsolidated sedimentary continental shelf edge
  - 2 types of seamount
  - 9 types of deep sea sedimentary bottom
- 16 types of offshore pelagic habitat

== Conservation status ==
As of 2011, of 136 identified marine and coastal habitat types, 47% are threatened, 17% are critically endangered, 7% are endangered, and 23% are vulnerable – more than 70% of the South African marine and coastal area is threatened to some extent Threatened habitat types tend to be of limited size, more coastal habitat types than offshore are threatened, and benthic habitats are more threatened than pelagic habitats in the offshore environment. The habitats associated with islands and rocky shelf edges are all threatened. Of the coastal habitats, many in the former Namaqualand and Southwestern Cape bioregions (now Benguela ecoregion) are threatened, while in the offshore bioregions, the most threatened habitat types are in the southern Benguela and Agulhas regions.

=== Protection ===
As of 2011, 54 (40%) of the listed marine and coastal habitat types were not represented in the South African marine protected areas, and therefore had no legal protection. Most of these were offshore, as most of the existing protected areas extend only a short distance from the coastline, and 13 of these are critically endangered. 6% of marine and coastal habitats are well protected, more in the coastal and inshore regions than offshore, and most coastal habitats are only moderately protected, as in many marine protected areas there is insufficient no-take zone area, so protection from fishing is limited. Only 4% of offshore habitat types were well protected. The range of protected habitat types was increased considerably by the proclamation of several offshore marine protected areas in late 2018.

=== Threats ===
The greatest identified impact on marine biodiversity is fishing, including poaching, which additionally threatens the livelihoods of legitimate fishers. The structure of the government departments responsible for fisheries and ecological management is inefficient. A further pressure on the coastal waters is coastal development, which has the greatest impact on coastal biodiversity. Along with climate change, inappropriate coastal development threatens the coastal habitats and their ecological processes. The reduction of freshwater flow from rivers due to dams and other use impacts marine, coastal and particularly estuarine ecosystems. About 40% of the flow from the largest catchments no longer reaches the estuaries, and this can have disruptive effects to the local ecological processes such as nursery functions. These effects are most severe on the east coast, and have been linked to linefish stock abundance more than 40 km offshore.

Most marine resources for which statistics are available are over-exploited and a significant number of species are threatened by this. The increase in invasive alien species is also a significant ecological threat. The mechanisms of introduction include shipping, mariculture and petroleum extraction activities. Observed climate change has already affected the ecological, fisheries, and resource management and has further socio-economic implications. The uncertainty of climate change trends makes the impacts difficult to predict, which increases the complexity of research and management.
