= East African coral coast =

Marine ecoregion of eastern Africa

The East African coral coast is a marine ecoregion along the eastern coast of Africa. It extends along the coasts of Kenya, Tanzania, and northern Mozambique, from Lamu in Kenya (2º30' S) to Angoche in Mozambique (16°14 S). It adjoins the Northern Monsoon Current Coast ecoregion to the north, and the Bight of Sofala/Swamp Coast ecoregion to the south.

== Major habitat types ==
Fringing coral reefs extend along much of the coast, extending .5 to 2 km from the shore on the narrow continental shelf. Fringing reefs extend along the coasts of Kenya and Tanzania as far as the Ruvuma River, which forms the Tanzania-Mozambique boundary. The fringing reefs are interrupted by major river mouths, including the Tana and Athi rivers in Kenya and the Rufiji in Tanzania. Unguja Island has a fringing reef along its eastern shore and extending around the southern and northern tips of the island. Mafia Island has a fringing reef along its eastern shore which extends south to the Songo Songo Islands.

Seagrass beds are found in clear, shallow lagoons between the fringing reefs and the shore, and between offshore islands and the mainland.

River mouths are home to the East African mangroves. The Rufiji River delta is the largest mangrove ecosystem on the East African coast, and accounts for half of Tanzania's 55,000 ha of mangroves. Other important mangrove forests in Tanzania are in Lindi and Tanga, at the mouths of the Wami, Ruvu, Matandu and Ruvuma rivers, and on the Mafia Archipelago. Kenya has 52,980 ha of mangroves, over two-thirds of which are concentrated around Lamu. Kilifi and Kwale account for most of the rest.

Fringing reefs are uncommon along the Mozambican coast, limited by freshwater input from numerous rivers, and cold-water upwelling in the Mozambique Channel. Patch reefs are best developed on the Quirimbas Islands, Primeiras and Segundas Archipelago, and Mozambique Island and neighboring islands in Mozambique Bay. Mangroves are found in the many river mouths, and seagrass beds occur in sheltered coastal waters.

== Fauna ==
The East African coral reefs are home to an estimated 3000 species, including corals, sponges, molluscs, fish, sea birds, and marine reptiles and mammals.

The ecoregion is home to all five of the Indian Ocean's sea turtle species – green sea turtle (Chelonia mydas), hawksbill sea turtle (Eretmochelys imbricata), olive ridley sea turtle (Lepidochelys olivacea), leatherback sea turtle, (Dermochelys coriacea), and loggerhead sea turtle (Caretta caretta). Dugongs (Dugong dugon) inhabit seagrass meadows, estuaries, and other sheltered coastal waters.

== Human use ==
The reefs provide many food fishes for coastal communities, including grunts, snapper, and parrotfish. Spiny lobsters – chiefly Palinurus ornatus, and also P. versicolor and P. longipes, are the most lucrative.

Coastal tourism is growing in economic importance in Kenya and Tanzania.

== Threats ==
The reefs, seagrass beds, and mangroves are increasingly threatened by human activity. Soil erosion from agriculture and grazing has increased the amount of silt carried by rivers into the coastal waters, damaging reefs and seagrass beds. Rivers also transport chemical fertilizers and toxic pesticides into marine environment. Over-fishing and exploitation of seashells, corals, turtle shells, for tourist souvenirs are diminishing marine fauna. Reefs are being destroyed by dynamite fishing, and mining of coral reefs for lime and construction materials. Bottom trawling for fish damages seagrass beds.

== Protected areas ==
Marine protected areas in Kenya include:

- Diani-Chale Marine National Park and Reserve
- Kisite-Mpunguti Marine National Park, includes Kisiti Marine National Park and Mpunguti Marine National Reserve.
- Malindi Marine National Park
- Mombasa Marine National Park and Reserve
- Watamu Marine National Park
- Watamu Marine National Reserve encompasses Watamu and Malindi marine national parks.

Marine protected areas in Tanzania include:

- Chumbe Island Coral Park established 1994
- Dar es Salaam Marine Reserve, established in 1981, includes:
  - Mbudya Marine Reserve
  - Bongoyo Marine Reserve
  - Pangavini Marine Reserve
  - Fungu Yasini Marine Reserve
- Mafia Island Marine Park, designated in 1995, includes:
  - Chole Bay Marine Reserve
  - Kitutia (Tutia) Marine Reserve
- Maziwi Island Marine Reserve
- Mnazi Bay-Ruvuma Estuary Marine Park
- Tanga Coral Gardens Marine Reserve

Marine protected areas in Mozambique include:

- Primeiras and Segundas Islands Environmental Protected Area
- Quirimbas National Park

== See also ==
- African coral reefs
