= Delagoa =

Marine ecoregion on the eastern coast of southern Africa

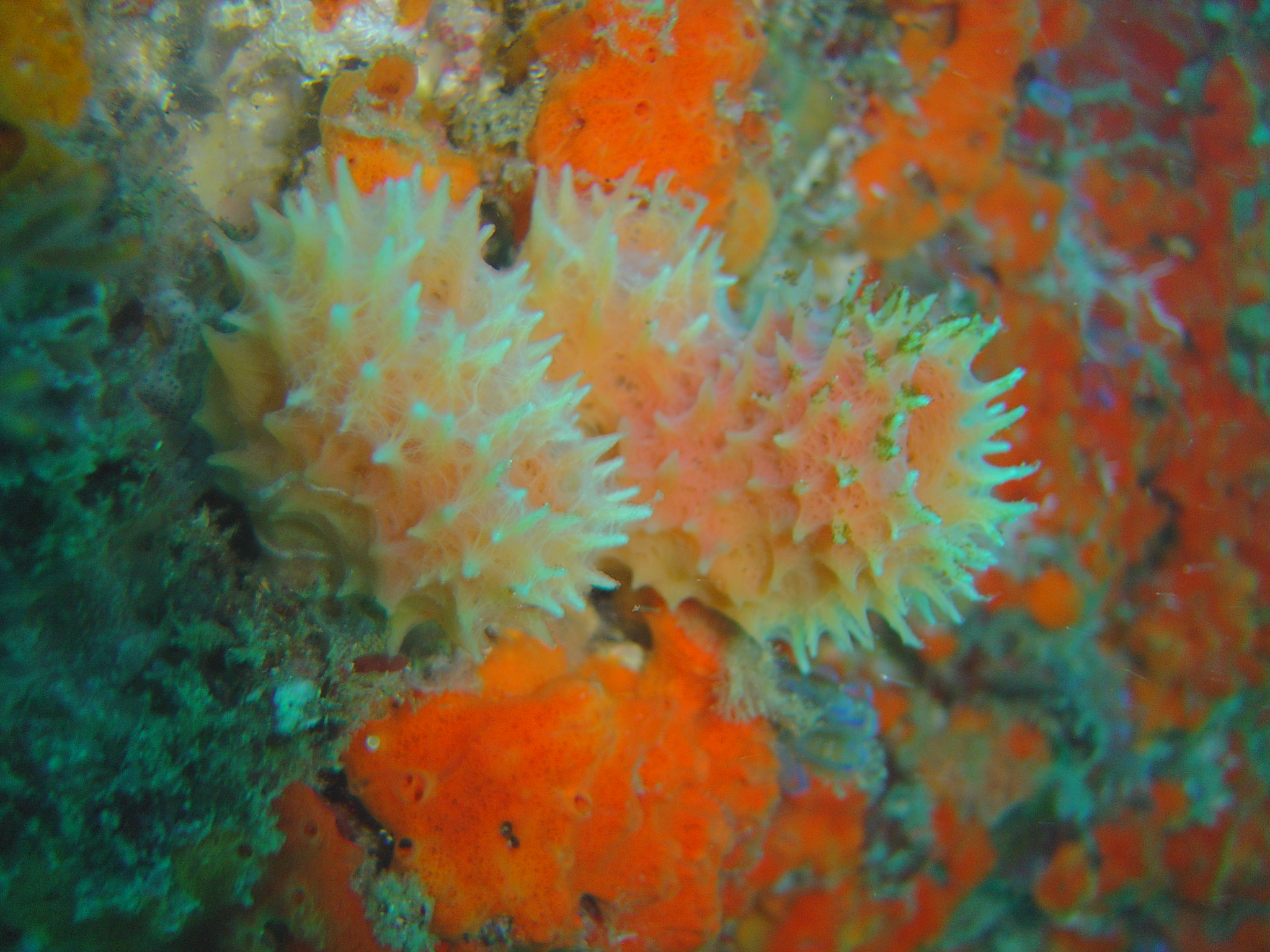
- Sponges at Pao Reef, Guinjata Bay, Mozambique

Ecology
- Realm: Western Indo-Pacific
- Province: Western Indian Ocean
- Borders (marine): Bight of Sofala/Swamp Coast, Natal
- Borders (mangrove): Southern Africa mangroves

Geography
- Countries: Mozambique; South Africa
- Province: Inhambane; Gaza; Maputo (Mozambique); KwaZulu-Natal (South Africa)
- Oceans or seas: Indian Ocean
- Physical features: Bazaruto Archipelago, Maputo Bay, Lake St. Lucia
- Currents: Agulhas Current

Delagoa is a marine ecoregion along the eastern coast of Africa. It extends along the coast of Mozambique and South Africa from the Bazaruto Archipelago (21°14’ S) to Lake St. Lucia in South Africa (28° 10' S) in South Africa's Kwazulu-Natal province. It adjoins the Bight of Sofala/Swamp Coast ecoregion to the north, and the Natal ecoregion to the south. It has Africa's southernmost tropical coral reefs and mangrove forests. It is the southernmost Indo-Pacific ecoregion, marking the transition from the tropical Indo-Pacific to Temperate Southern Africa.

== Geography ==
The dominant shoreline feature in the ecoregion is sandy beaches backed by coastal dunes. The dunes can reach up to 120 meters in height, and older dunes are vegetated. Behind the coastal dunes are lagoons, including river estuaries, closed saline lagoons, and salt lakes.

The warm Agulhas Current runs southward parallel to the coast.

== Habitat types ==
Seagrass meadows are found in sheltered waters behind coastal islands and in large estuaries.

Outcrops of sandstone support algae and corals, including coral reefs. Hard corals are reaching their southern limit, and soft corals are more common. The Bazaruto Archipelago is home to fringing reefs and patch reefs made up of soft and hard corals. High thickets of Porites and Acropora hard corals grow in the archipelago's sheltered back reefs. Fringing reefs are also found at Inhaca and Portuguese Islands near Maputo Bay.

The southernmost reef corals are found on the northern coast of Kwazulu-Natal in South Africa, between the Mozambican border and Cape Vidal. A community of hard and soft corals, sponges, and ascidians, known as the Maputaland Reef Complex, live on submerged outcrops of fossilized dune and beach rock 9 to 13 meters below the surface. The corals do not form reef structures.

Mangroves occur at Bazaruto Island, at the mouth of the Limpopo River, and around Maputo Bay, including Inhaca Island and the estuary of the Komati River.

== Fauna ==
The seagrass meadows of the Bazaruto Archipelago are home to Dugongs (Dugong dugon). Loggerhead and leatherback sea turtles lay their eggs on the region's sandy beaches. The offshore area between Závora and Vilanculos attracts whale sharks (Rhincodon typus) and manta rays (Manta alfredi and Manta birostris).

== Protected areas ==
Marine protected areas include:

- Bazaruto National Park, Mozambique
- Maputo Special Reserve, Mozambique
- Ilhas da Inhaca e dos Portugueses Faunal Reserve, Mozambique
- Ponta do Ouro Partial Marine Reserve, Mozambique
- Machangulo Private Nature Reserve, Mozambique
- iSimangaliso Wetland Park, South Africa
