= Robert Bailey (geographer) =

American geographer

Robert G. Bailey (born 1939) is an American geographer. In the mid-1990s the US Forest Service adapted the Bailey hierarchy of ecological units for use as the scientific framework for ecosystem management of the national forests.

Bailey has a PhD in geography from the University of California, Los Angeles.
