= Temperate Southern Africa =

Biogeographic region of the Earth's seas

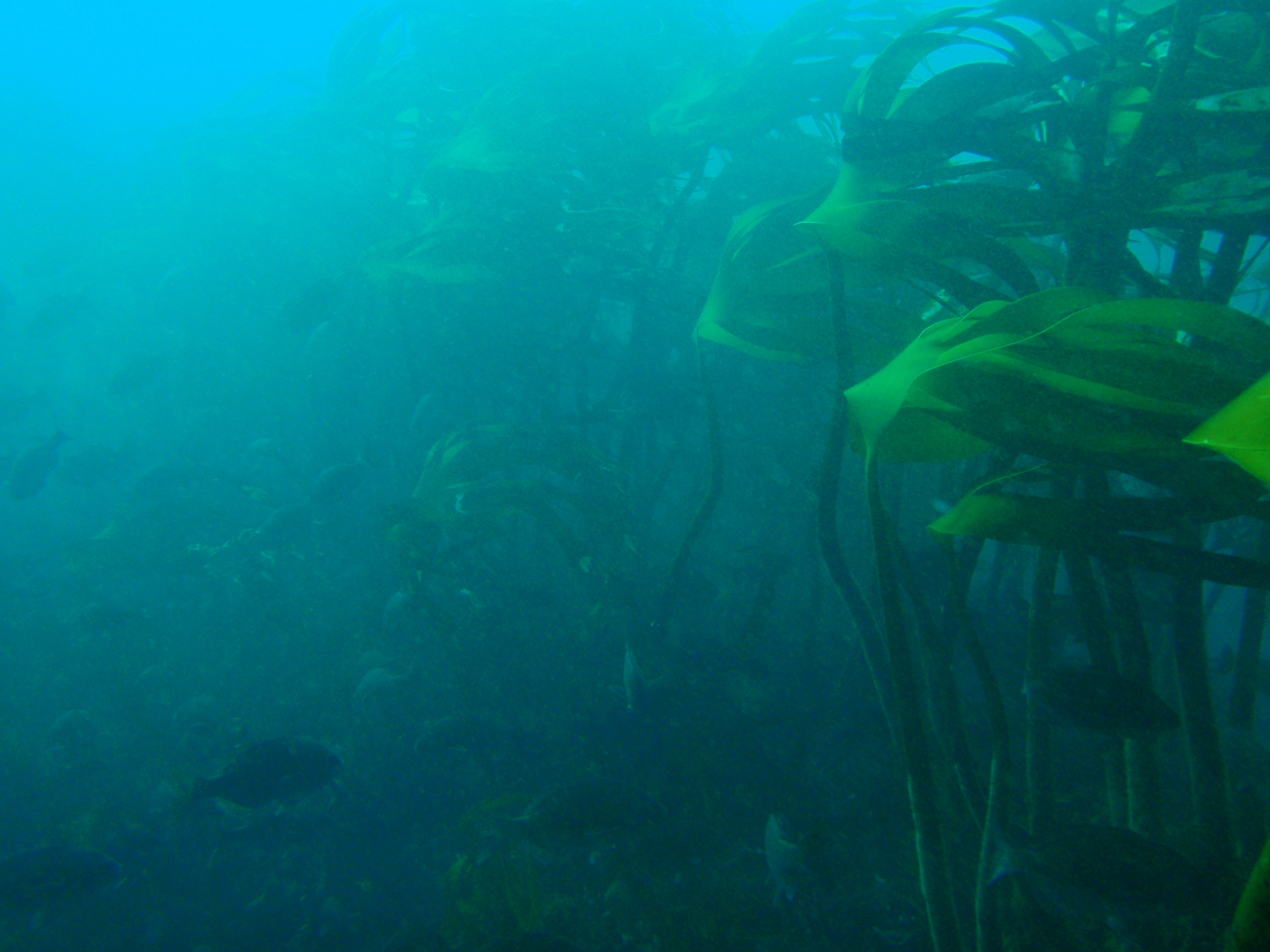
Kelp forest off the coast of Western Cape, South Africa

Temperate Southern Africa is a biogeographic region of the Earth's seas, comprising the temperate waters of southern Africa, where the Atlantic Ocean and Indian Ocean meet. It is a marine realm, one of the great biogeographic divisions of the world's oceans. It includes the coastal and continental shelf waters of South Africa and Namibia, and reaches to southern Angola. It also includes the remote islands of Amsterdam and Saint-Paul, to the east in the southern Indian Ocean.

The boundary between the Temperate Southern Africa and Western Indo-Pacific marine realms is near Lake St. Lucia, in South Africa near the border with Mozambique. The realm extends up the Atlantic coast of Africa to Tômbua in southern Angola, where it transitions to the Tropical Atlantic realm.

== Kelp forests ==
Kelp forests grow on rocky seabeds along the coast of Namibia and western South Africa, from 22 to 35° S latitude. The dominant kelp species are Macrocystis sp., Ecklonia maxima, and Laminaria pallida.

== Subdivisions ==
The Temperate Southern Africa realm is further subdivided into three marine provinces. Benguela province includes the Atlantic portion of the realm, influenced by the cold Benguela Current. Agulhas province includes the rest of the South Africa's southern and eastern coasts which are influenced by the warm Agulhas Current. The Cape of Good Hope is the boundary between the Benguela and Agulhas provinces. Amsterdam and St. Paul islands are a separate province.

The Benguela and Agulhas marine provinces are divided into two marine ecoregions.

- Benguela province
  - Namib ecoregion
  - Namaqua ecoregion
- Agulhas province
  - Agulhas ecoregion
  - Natal ecoregion
- Amsterdam–St Paul province
  - Amsterdam–St Paul ecoregion

== See also ==
- Marine ecoregions of the South African exclusive economic zone
