= Biome =

Biogeographical unit with a particular biological community

A biome (/ˈbaɪ.oʊm/, BY-ohm) is a distinct geographical region with specific climate, vegetation, and animal life. It consists of a biological community that has formed in response to its physical environment and regional climate. In 1935, Arthur Tansley added the climatic soil aspects to the idea, calling it ecosystem. The International Biological Program (1964–74) projects popularized the concept of biome.

However, in some contexts, the term biome is used in a different manner. In German literature, particularly in the Walter terminology, the term is used similarly as biotope (a concrete geographical unit), while the biome definition used in this article is used as an international, non-regional, terminology—irrespectively of the continent in which an area is present, it takes the same biome name—and corresponds to Walter's "zonobiome", "orobiome" and "pedobiome" (biomes determined by climate zone, altitude, or soil).

In the Brazilian literature, the term biome is sometimes used as a synonym of biogeographic province, an area based on species composition (the term floristic province being used when plant species are considered), or also as synonym of the "morphoclimatic and phytogeographical domain" of Ab'Sáber, a geographic space with subcontinental dimensions, with the predominance of similar geomorphologic and climatic characteristics, and of a certain vegetation form. Both include many biomes in fact.

== Classifications ==
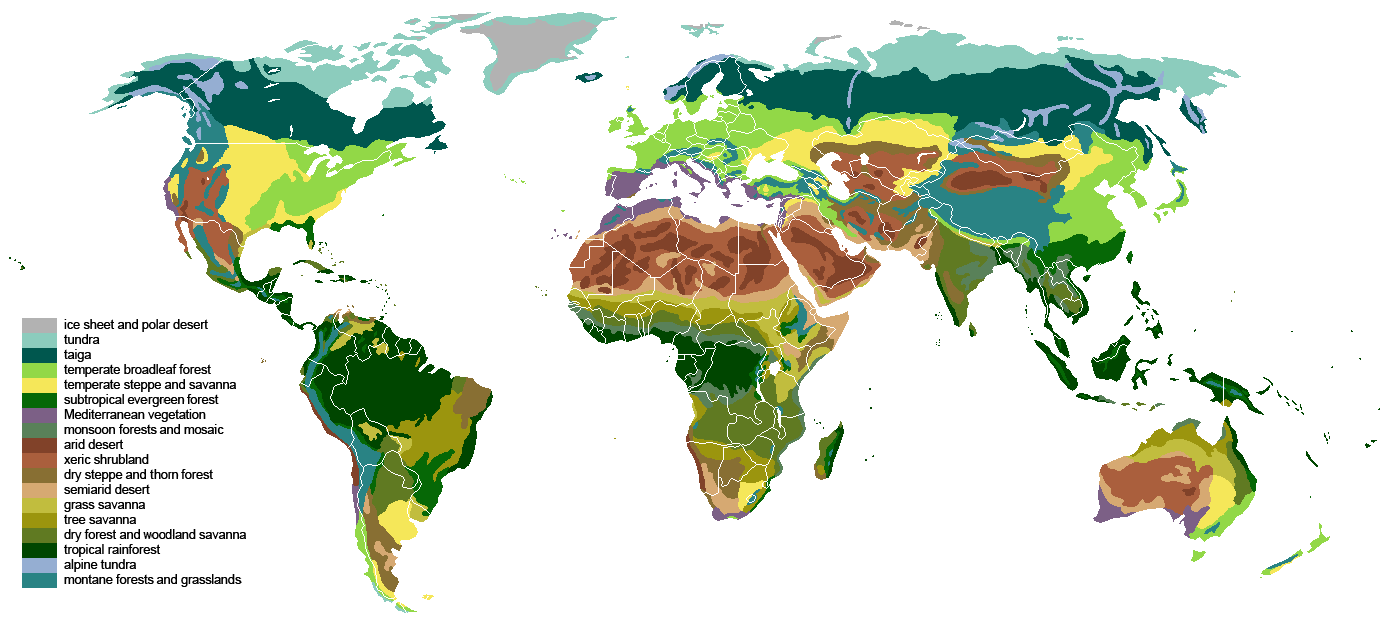
One way of mapping terrestrial biomes around the world (excluding Antarctic tundra)

To divide the world into a few ecological zones is difficult, notably because of the small-scale variations that exist everywhere on earth and because of the gradual changeover from one biome to the other. Their boundaries must therefore be drawn arbitrarily and their characterization made according to the average conditions that predominate in them.

A 1978 study on North American grasslands found a positive logistic correlation between evapotranspiration in mm/yr and above-ground net primary production in g/m^{2}/yr. The general results from the study were that precipitation and water use led to above-ground primary production, while solar irradiation and temperature lead to below-ground primary production (roots), and temperature and water lead to cool and warm season growth habit. These findings help explain the categories used in Holdridge's bioclassification scheme (see below), which were then later simplified by Whittaker. The number of classification schemes and the variety of determinants used in those schemes, however, should be taken as strong indicators that biomes do not fit perfectly into the classification schemes created.

=== Holdridge (1947, 1964) life zones ===
Holdridge life zone classification scheme. Although conceived as three-dimensional by its originator, it is usually shown as a two-dimensional array of hexagons in a triangular frame.

In 1947, the American botanist and climatologist Leslie Holdridge classified climates based on the biological effects of temperature and rainfall on vegetation under the assumption that these two abiotic factors are the largest determinants of the types of vegetation found in a habitat. Holdridge uses the four axes to define 30 so-called "humidity provinces", which are clearly visible in his diagram. While this scheme largely ignores soil and sun exposure, Holdridge acknowledged that these were important.

=== Allee (1949) biome-types ===
The principal biome-types by Allee (1949):

- Tundra
- Taiga
- Deciduous forest
- Grasslands
- Desert
- High plateaus
- Tropical forest
- Minor terrestrial biomes

=== Kendeigh (1961) biomes ===
The principal biomes of the world by Kendeigh (1961):

- Terrestrial
  - Temperate deciduous forest
  - Coniferous forest
  - Woodland
  - Chaparral
  - Tundra
  - Grassland
  - Desert
  - Tropical savanna
  - Tropical forest
- Marine
  - Oceanic plankton and nekton
  - Balanoid-gastropod-thallophyte
  - Pelecypod-annelid
  - Coral reef

=== Whittaker (1962, 1970, 1975) biome-types ===
The distribution of vegetation types as a function of mean annual temperature and precipitation

Whittaker classified biomes using two abiotic factors: precipitation and temperature. His scheme can be seen as a simplification of Holdridge's; more readily accessible, but missing Holdridge's greater specificity.

Whittaker based his approach on theoretical assertions and empirical sampling. He had previously compiled a review of biome classifications.

==== Key definitions for understanding Whittaker's scheme ====
- Physiognomy: sometimes referring to the plants' appearance; or the biome's apparent characteristics, outward features, or appearance of ecological communities or species – including plants.
- Biome: a grouping of terrestrial ecosystems on a given continent that is similar in vegetation structure, physiognomy, features of the environment and characteristics of their animal communities.
- Formation: a major kind of community of plants on a given continent.
- Biome-type: grouping of convergent biomes or formations of different continents, defined by physiognomy.
- Formation-type: a grouping of convergent formations.

Whittaker's distinction between biome and formation can be simplified: formation is used when applied to plant communities only, while biome is used when concerned with both plants and animals. Whittaker's convention of biome-type or formation-type is a broader method to categorize similar communities.

==== Whittaker's parameters for classifying biome-types ====
Whittaker used what he called "gradient analysis" of ecocline patterns to relate communities to climate on a worldwide scale. Whittaker considered four main ecoclines in the terrestrial realm.

1. Intertidal levels: The wetness gradient of areas that are exposed to alternating water and dryness with intensities that vary by location from high to low tide
2. Climatic moisture gradient
3. Temperature gradient by altitude
4. Temperature gradient by latitude

Along these gradients, Whittaker noted several trends that allowed him to qualitatively establish biome-types:

- The gradient runs from favorable to the extreme, with corresponding changes in productivity.
- Changes in physiognomic complexity vary with how favorable of an environment exists (decreasing community structure and reduction of stratal differentiation as the environment becomes less favorable).
- Trends in the diversity of structure follow trends in species diversity; alpha and beta species diversities decrease from favorable to extreme environments.
- Each growth-form (i.e. grasses, shrubs, etc.) has its characteristic place of maximum importance along the ecoclines.
- The same growth forms may be dominant in similar environments in widely different parts of the world.

Whittaker summed the effects of gradients (3) and (4) to get an overall temperature gradient and combined this with a gradient (2), the moisture gradient, to express the above conclusions in what is known as the Whittaker classification scheme. The scheme graphs average annual precipitation (x-axis) versus average annual temperature (y-axis) to classify biome-types.

==== Biome-types ====
1. Tropical rainforest
2. Tropical seasonal rainforest
  - deciduous
  - semideciduous
3. Temperate giant rainforest
4. Montane rainforest
5. Temperate deciduous forest
6. Temperate evergreen forest
  - needleleaf
  - sclerophyll
7. Subarctic-subalpine needle-leaved forests (taiga)
8. Elfin woodland
9. Thorn forest
10. Thorn scrub
11. Temperate woodland
12. Temperate shrublands
  - deciduous
  - heath
  - sclerophyll
  - subalpine-needleleaf
  - subalpine-broadleaf
13. Savanna
14. Temperate grassland
15. Alpine grasslands
16. Tundra
17. Tropical desert
18. Warm-temperate desert
19. Cool temperate desert scrub
20. Arctic-alpine desert
21. Bog
22. Tropical fresh-water swamp forest
23. Temperate fresh-water swamp forest
24. Mangrove swamp
25. Salt marsh
26. Wetland

=== Goodall (1974–) ecosystem types ===
The multi-authored series Ecosystems of the World, edited by David W. Goodall, provides a comprehensive coverage of the major "ecosystem types or biomes" on Earth:

1. Terrestrial Ecosystems
  1. Natural Terrestrial Ecosystems
    1. Wet Coastal Ecosystems
    2. Dry Coastal Ecosystems
    3. Polar and Alpine Tundra
    4. Mires: Swamp, Bog, Fen, and Moor
    5. Temperate Deserts and Semi-Deserts
    6. Coniferous Forests
    7. Temperate Deciduous Forests
    8. Natural Grasslands
    9. Heathlands and Related Shrublands
    10. Temperate Broad-Leaved Evergreen Forests
    11. Mediterranean-Type Shrublands
    12. Hot Deserts and Arid Shrublands
    13. Tropical Savannas
    14. Tropical Rain Forest Ecosystems
    15. Wetland Forests
    16. Ecosystems of Disturbed Ground
  2. Managed Terrestrial Ecosystems
    17. Managed Grasslands
    18. Field Crop Ecosystems
    19. Tree Crop Ecosystems
    20. Greenhouse Ecosystems
    21. Bioindustrial Ecosystems
2. Aquatic Ecosystems
  1. Inland Aquatic Ecosystems
    22. River and Stream Ecosystems
    23. Lakes and Reservoirs
  2. Marine Ecosystems
    24. Intertidal and Littoral Ecosystems
    25. Coral Reefs
    26. Estuaries and Enclosed Seas
    27. Ecosystems of the Continental Shelves
    28. Ecosystems of the Deep Ocean
  3. Managed Aquatic Ecosystems
    29. Managed Aquatic Ecosystems
3. Underground Ecosystems
  30. Cave Ecosystems

=== Walter (1976, 2002) zonobiomes ===
The eponymously named Heinrich Walter classification scheme considers the seasonality of temperature and precipitation. The system, also assessing precipitation and temperature, finds nine major biome types, with the important climate traits and vegetation types. The boundaries of each biome correlate to the conditions of moisture and cold stress that are strong determinants of plant form, and therefore the vegetation that defines the region. Extreme conditions, such as flooding in a swamp, can create different kinds of communities within the same biome.

Number	Zonobiome	Zonal soil type	Zonal vegetation type
ZB I	Equatorial, always moist, little temperature seasonality	Equatorial brown clays	Evergreen tropical rainforest
ZB II	Tropical, summer rainy season and cooler "winter" dry season	Red clays or red earths	Tropical seasonal forest, seasonal dry forest, scrub, or savanna
ZB III	Subtropical, highly seasonal, arid climate	Serosemes, sierozemes	Desert vegetation with considerable exposed surface
ZB IV	Mediterranean, winter rainy season and summer drought	Mediterranean brown earths	Sclerophyllous (drought-adapted), frost-sensitive shrublands and woodlands
ZB V	Warm temperate, occasional frost, often with summer rainfall maximum	Yellow or red forest soils, slightly podsolic soils	Temperate evergreen forest, somewhat frost-sensitive
ZB VI	Nemoral, moderate climate with winter freezing	Forest brown earths and grey forest soils	Frost-resistant, deciduous, temperate forest
ZB VII	Continental, arid, with warm or hot summers and cold winters	Chernozems to serozems	Grasslands and temperate deserts
ZB VIII	Boreal, cold temperate with cool summers and long winters	Podsols	Evergreen, frost-hardy, needle-leaved forest (taiga)
ZB IX	Polar, short, cool summers and long, cold winters	Tundra humus soils with solifluction (permafrost soils)	Low, evergreen vegetation, without trees, growing over permanently frozen soils

=== Schultz (1988) eco-zones ===
Schultz (1988, 2005) defined nine ecozones (his concept of ecozone is more similar to the concept of biome than to the concept of ecozone of BBC):

1. polar/subpolar zone
2. boreal zone
3. humid mid-latitudes
4. dry mid-latitudes
5. subtropics with winter rain
6. subtropics with year-round rain
7. dry tropics and subtropics
8. tropics with summer rain
9. tropics with year-round rain

=== Bailey (1989) ecoregions ===
Robert G. Bailey nearly developed a biogeographical classification system of ecoregions for the United States in a map published in 1976. He subsequently expanded the system to include the rest of North America in 1981, and the world in 1989. The Bailey system, based on climate, is divided into four domains (polar, humid temperate, dry, and humid tropical), with further divisions based on other climate characteristics (subarctic, warm temperate, hot temperate, and subtropical; marine and continental; lowland and mountain).

- 100 Polar Domain
  - 120 Tundra Division (Köppen: Ft)
  - M120 Tundra Division – Mountain Provinces
  - 130 Subarctic Division (Köppen: E)
  - M130 Subarctic Division – Mountain Provinces
- 200 Humid Temperate Domain
  - 210 Warm Continental Division (Köppen: portion of Dcb)
  - M210 Warm Continental Division – Mountain Provinces
  - 220 Hot Continental Division (Köppen: portion of Dca)
  - M220 Hot Continental Division – Mountain Provinces
  - 230 Subtropical Division (Köppen: portion of Cf)
  - M230 Subtropical Division – Mountain Provinces
  - 240 Marine Division (Köppen: Do)
  - M240 Marine Division – Mountain Provinces
  - 250 Prairie Division (Köppen: arid portions of Cf, Dca, Dcb)
  - 260 Mediterranean Division (Köppen: Cs)
  - M260 Mediterranean Division – Mountain Provinces
- 300 Dry Domain
  - 310 Tropical/Subtropical Steppe Division
  - M310 Tropical/Subtropical Steppe Division – Mountain Provinces
  - 320 Tropical/Subtropical Desert Division
  - 330 Temperate Steppe Division
  - 340 Temperate Desert Division
- 400 Humid Tropical Domain
  - 410 Savanna Division
  - 420 Rainforest Division

=== Olson & Dinerstein (1998) biomes for WWF / Global 200 ===
Terrestrial biomes of the world according to Olson & Dinerstein et al. and used by the WWF and Global 200: 01. Tropical and subtropical moist broadleaf forests; 02. Tropical and subtropical dry broadleaf forests; 03. Tropical and subtropical coniferous forests; 04. Temperate broadleaf and mixed forests; 05. Temperate coniferous forests; 06. Taiga and Boreal forest; 07. Tropical and subtropical grasslands, savannas, and shrublands; 08. Temperate grasslands, savannas, and shrublands; 09. Flooded grasslands and savannas; 10. Montane grasslands and shrublands; 11. Tundra; 12. Mediterranean forests, woodlands, and scrub; 13. Deserts and xeric shrublands; 14. Mangroves; Rock and Ice, or Abiotic Land Zones

A team of biologists convened by the World Wildlife Fund (WWF) developed a scheme that divided the world's land area into biogeographic realms (called "ecozones" in a BBC scheme), and these into ecoregions (Olson & Dinerstein, 1998, etc.). Each ecoregion is characterized by a main biome (also called major habitat type).

This classification is used to define the Global 200 list of ecoregions identified by the WWF as priorities for conservation.

For the terrestrial ecoregions, there is a specific EcoID, format XXnnNN (XX is the biogeographic realm, nn is the biome number, NN is the individual number).

==== Biogeographic realms (terrestrial and freshwater) ====
The western Palearctic terrestrial ecozone has 9 of the 14 biomes numbered by Olson & Dinerstein et al.: 04. Temperate broadleaf and mixed forests; 05. Temperate coniferous forests; 06. Taiga and Boreal forest; 08. Temperate grasslands, savannas, and shrublands; 09. Flooded grasslands and savannas; 10. Montane grasslands and shrublands; 11. Tundra; 12. Mediterranean forests, woodlands, and scrub; 13. Deserts and xeric shrublands; Rock and Ice, or Abiotic Land Zones

- NA: Nearctic
- PA: Palearctic
- AT: Afrotropic
- IM: Indomalaya
- AA: Australasia
- NT: Neotropic
- OC: Oceania
- AN: Antarctic

The applicability of the realms scheme above – based on Udvardy (1975)—to most freshwater taxa is unresolved.

==== Biogeographic realms (marine) ====
- Arctic
- Temperate Northern Atlantic
- Temperate Northern Pacific
- Tropical Atlantic
- Western Indo-Pacific
- Central Indo-Pacific
- Eastern Indo-Pacific
- Tropical Eastern Pacific
- Temperate South America
- Temperate Southern Africa
- Temperate Australasia
- Southern Ocean

==== Biomes (terrestrial) ====
1. Tropical and subtropical moist broadleaf forests (tropical and subtropical, humid)
2. Tropical and subtropical dry broadleaf forests (tropical and subtropical, semihumid)
3. Tropical and subtropical coniferous forests (tropical and subtropical, semihumid)
4. Temperate broadleaf and mixed forests (temperate, humid)
5. Temperate coniferous forests (temperate, humid to semihumid)
6. Boreal forests/taiga (subarctic, humid)
7. Tropical and subtropical grasslands, savannas, and shrublands (tropical and subtropical, semiarid)
8. Temperate grasslands, savannas, and shrublands (temperate, semiarid)
9. Flooded grasslands and savannas (temperate to tropical and subtropical, fresh or brackish water inundated)
10. Montane grasslands and shrublands (alpine or montane climate)
11. Tundra (Arctic, alpine and Antarctic)
12. Mediterranean forests, woodlands, and scrub (temperate warm, semihumid to semiarid with winter rainfall)
13. Deserts and xeric shrublands (temperate to tropical and subtropical, arid)
14. Mangroves (subtropical and tropical, salt water inundated)

==== Biomes (freshwater) ====
According to the WWF, the following are classified as freshwater biomes:

- Large lakes
- Large river deltas
- Montane freshwaters
- Temperate coastal rivers
- Temperate floodplain rivers and wetlands
- Temperate upland rivers
- Tropical and subtropical coastal rivers
- Tropical and subtropical floodplain rivers and wetlands
- Tropical and subtropical upland rivers
- Xeric freshwaters and endorheic basins
- Oceanic islands

==== Biomes (marine) ====
Biomes of the coastal and continental shelf areas (neritic zone):

- Polar
- Temperate shelves and sea
- Temperate upwelling
- Tropical upwelling
- Tropical coral

==== Summary of the scheme ====
- Biosphere
  - Biogeographic realms (terrestrial) (8)
    - Ecoregions (867), each characterized by a biome, a major habitat type (14)
      - Ecosystems (biotopes)
- Biosphere
  - Biogeographic realms (freshwater) (8)
    - Ecoregions (426), each characterized by a biome, a major habitat type (12)
      - Ecosystems (biotopes)
- Biosphere
  - Biogeographic realms (marine) (12)
    - (Marine provinces) (62)
      - Ecoregions (232), each characterized by a biome, a major habitat type (5)
        - Ecosystems (biotopes)

Example:

- Biosphere
  - Biogeographic realm: Palearctic
    - Ecoregion: Dinaric Mountains mixed forests (PA0418); biome type: temperate broadleaf and mixed forests
      - Ecosystem: Orjen, vegetation belt between 1,100 and 1,450 m, Oromediterranean zone, nemoral zone (temperate zone)
        - Biotope: Oreoherzogio-Abietetum illyricae Fuk. (Plant list)
          - Plant: Silver fir (Abies alba)

== Other biomes ==
=== Marine biomes ===
Pruvot (1896) zones or "systems":

- Littoral zone
- Pelagic zone
- Abyssal zone

Longhurst (1998) biomes:

- Coastal
- Polar seas
- Trade wind
- Westerly

Other marine habitat types (not covered yet by the Global 200/WWF scheme):

- Open sea
- Deep sea
- Hydrothermal vents
- Cold seeps
- Benthic zone
- Pelagic zone (trades and westerlies)
- Abyssal
- Hadal (ocean trench)
- Littoral/Intertidal zone
- Salt marsh
- Estuaries
- Coastal lagoons/Atoll lagoons
- Kelp forest
- Pack ice

=== Anthropogenic biomes ===
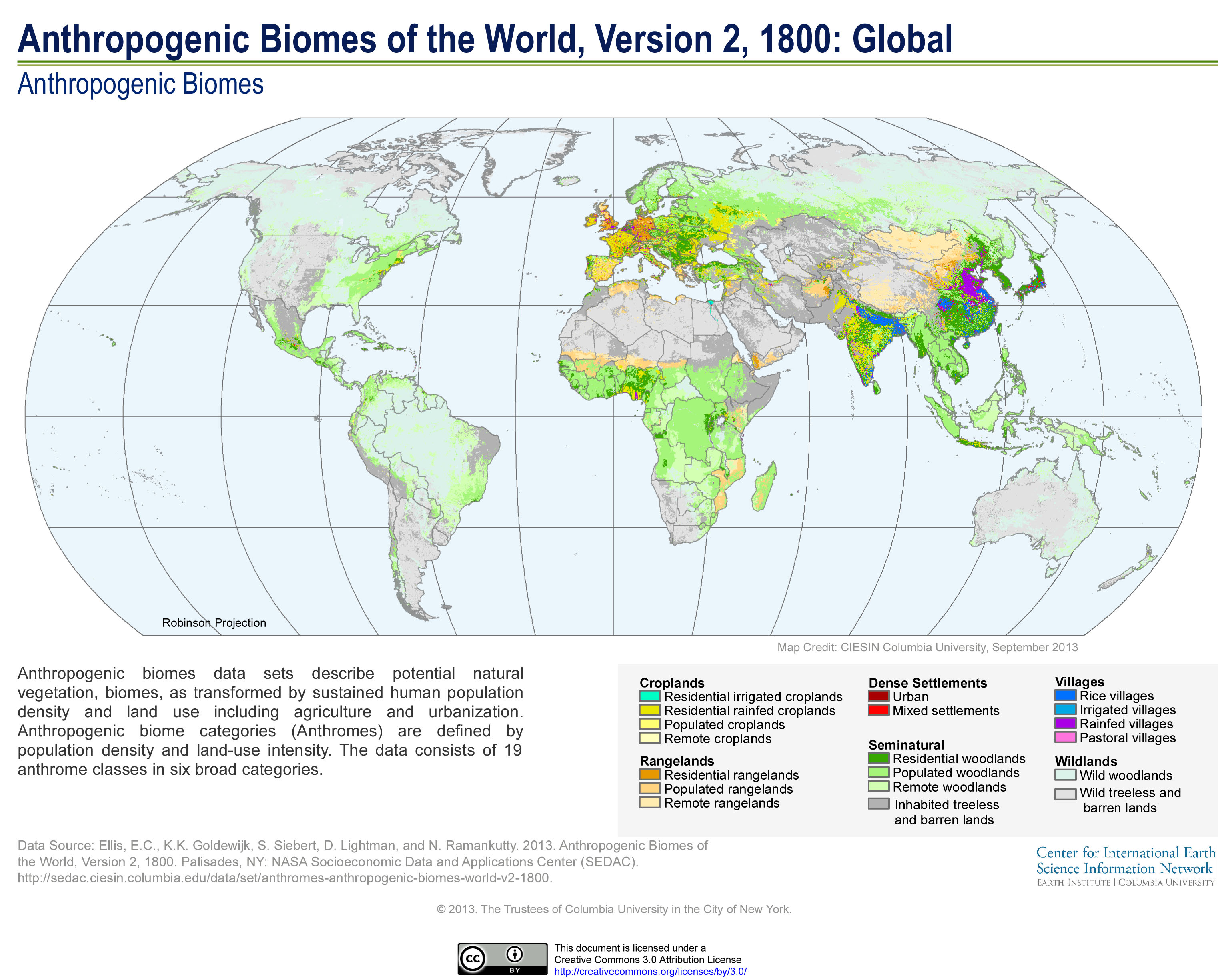
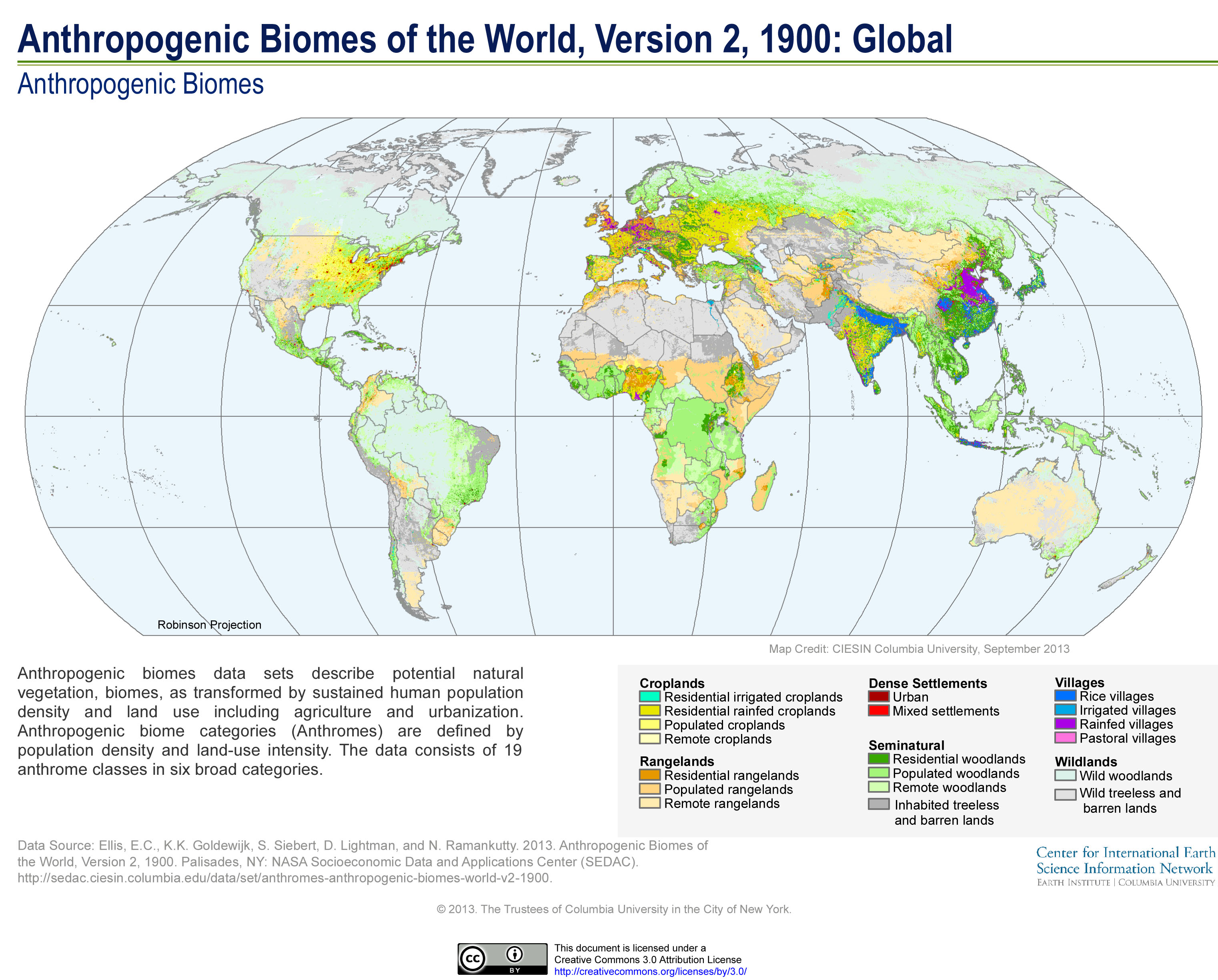
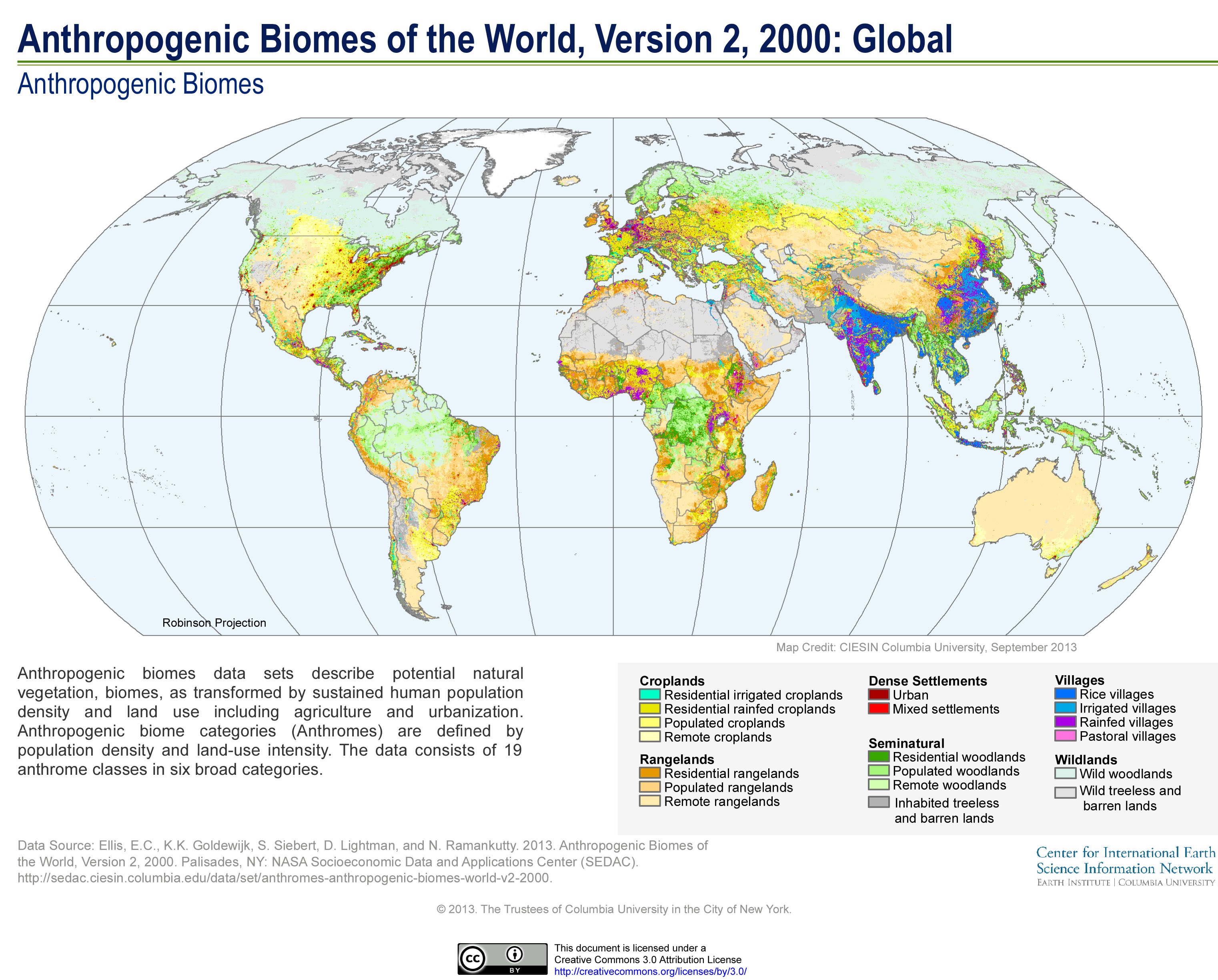
Anthropogenic biomes have grown dramatically in the past few centuries

Humans have altered global patterns of biodiversity and ecosystem processes. As a result, vegetation forms predicted by conventional biome systems can no longer be observed across much of Earth's land surface as they have been replaced by crops and rangelands or cities. Anthropogenic biomes provide an alternative view of the terrestrial biosphere based on global patterns of sustained direct human interaction with ecosystems, including agriculture, human settlements, urbanization, forestry and other uses of land. Anthropogenic biomes offer a way to recognize the irreversible coupling of human and ecological systems at global scales and manage Earth's biosphere and anthropogenic biomes.

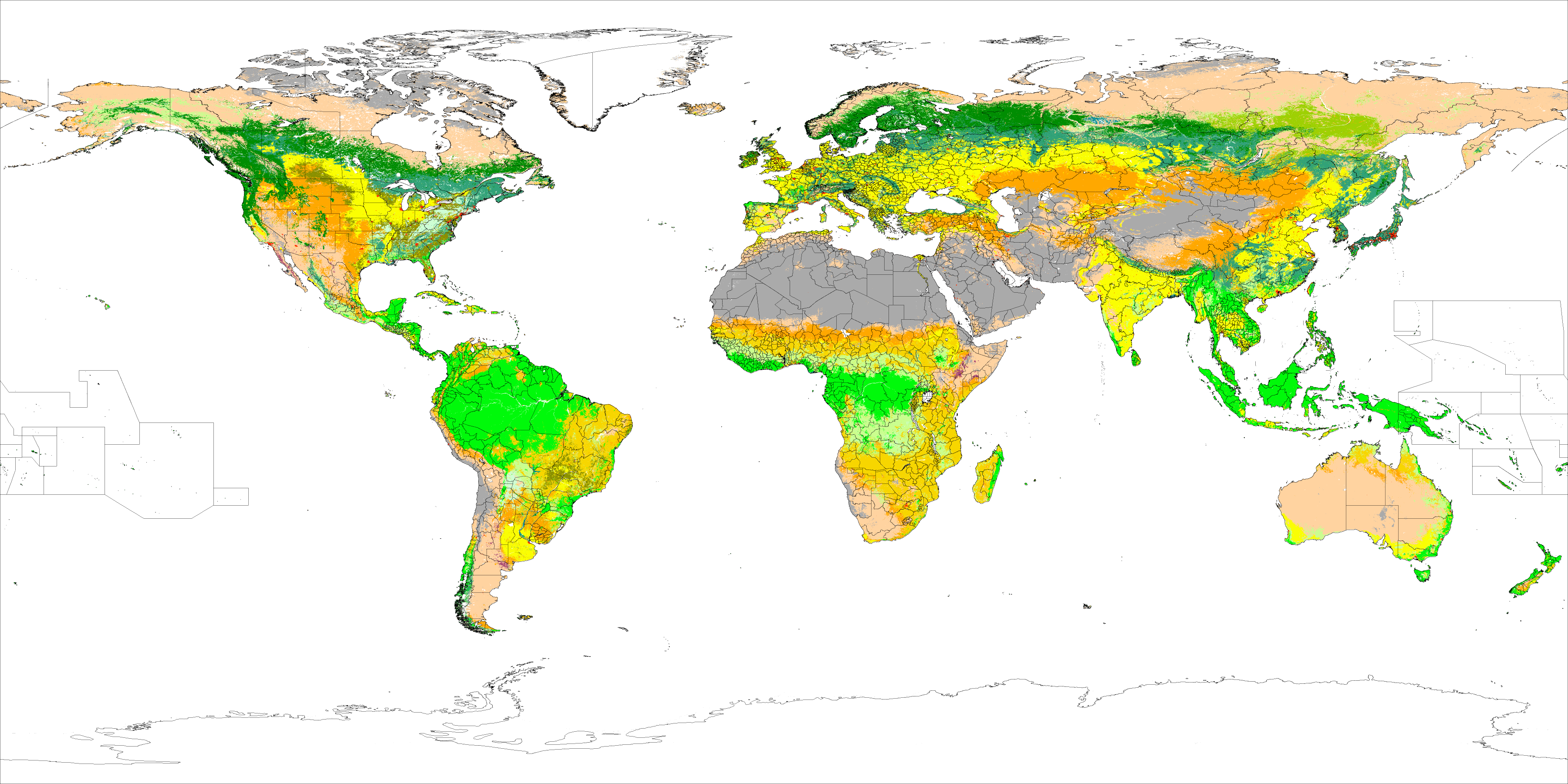
Similarities can be seen between the 14 terrestrial bioregions of Olson & Dinerstein et al. and the 17 land cover classes of the International Geosphere-Biosphere Programme, "which includes 11 natural vegetation classes, 3 developed and mosaicked land classes, and 3 non-vegetated land classes", as detected by satellites. Water Evergreen Needleleaf forest Evergreen Broadleaf forest Deciduous Needleleaf Forest Deciduous Broadleaf Forest Mixed Forest Closed Shrubland Open Shrubland Woody Savannas Savannas Grasslands Permanent Wetlands Croplands Urban and Built-Up Cropland/Natural Vegetation Mosaic Snow and Ice Barren or Sparsely Vegetated

Major anthropogenic biomes:

- Dense settlements
- Croplands
- Rangelands
- Forested
- Indoor

=== Microbial biomes ===
==== Endolithic biomes ====
The endolithic biome, consisting entirely of microscopic life in rock pores and cracks, kilometers beneath the surface, has only recently been discovered, and does not fit well into most classification schemes.

== Effects of climate change ==
Anthropogenic climate change has the potential to greatly alter the distribution of Earth's biomes. Meaning, biomes around the world could change so much that they would be at risk of becoming new biomes entirely. More specifically, between 54% and 22% of global land area will experience climates that correspond to other biomes. 3.6% of land area will experience climates that are completely new or unusual. An example of a biome shift is woody plant encroachment, which can change grass savanna into shrub savanna.

Average temperatures have risen more than twice the usual amount in both arctic and mountainous biomes, which leads to the conclusion that arctic and mountainous biomes are currently the most vulnerable to climate change. South American terrestrial biomes have been predicted to go through the same temperature trends as arctic and mountainous biomes. With its annual average temperature continuing to increase, the moisture currently located in forest biomes will dry up.

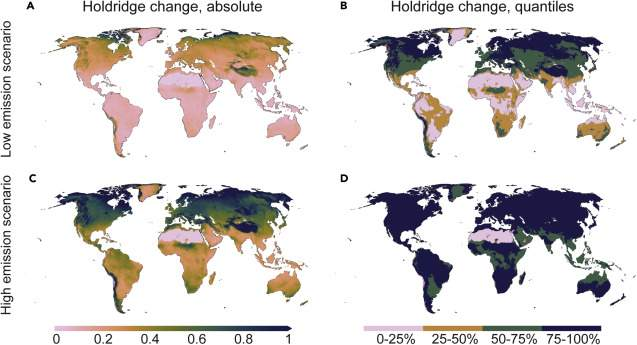
Predicted changes for Earth's biomes under two different climate change scenarios for 2081–2100. Top row is low emissions scenario, bottom row is high emissions scenario. Biomes are classified with Holdridge life zones system. A shift of 1 or 100% (darker colours) indicates that the region has fully moved into a completely different biome zone type.

Climate change is already now altering biomes, adversely affecting terrestrial and marine ecosystems. Climate change represents long-term changes in temperature and average weather patterns. This leads to a substantial increase in both the frequency and the intensity of extreme weather events. As a region's climate changes, a change in its flora and fauna follows. For instance, out of 4000 species analyzed by the IPCC Sixth Assessment Report, half were found to have shifted their distribution to higher latitudes or elevations in response to climate change.

== See also ==
- Climate classification – Systems that categorize the world's climates
- Ecotope – Ecologically distinct landscape feature
- Life zone – Concept developed by C. Hart Merriam in 1889
- Natural environment – Living and non-living things on Earth
