= Southern Africa mangroves =

Ecoregion in Mozambique and South Africa

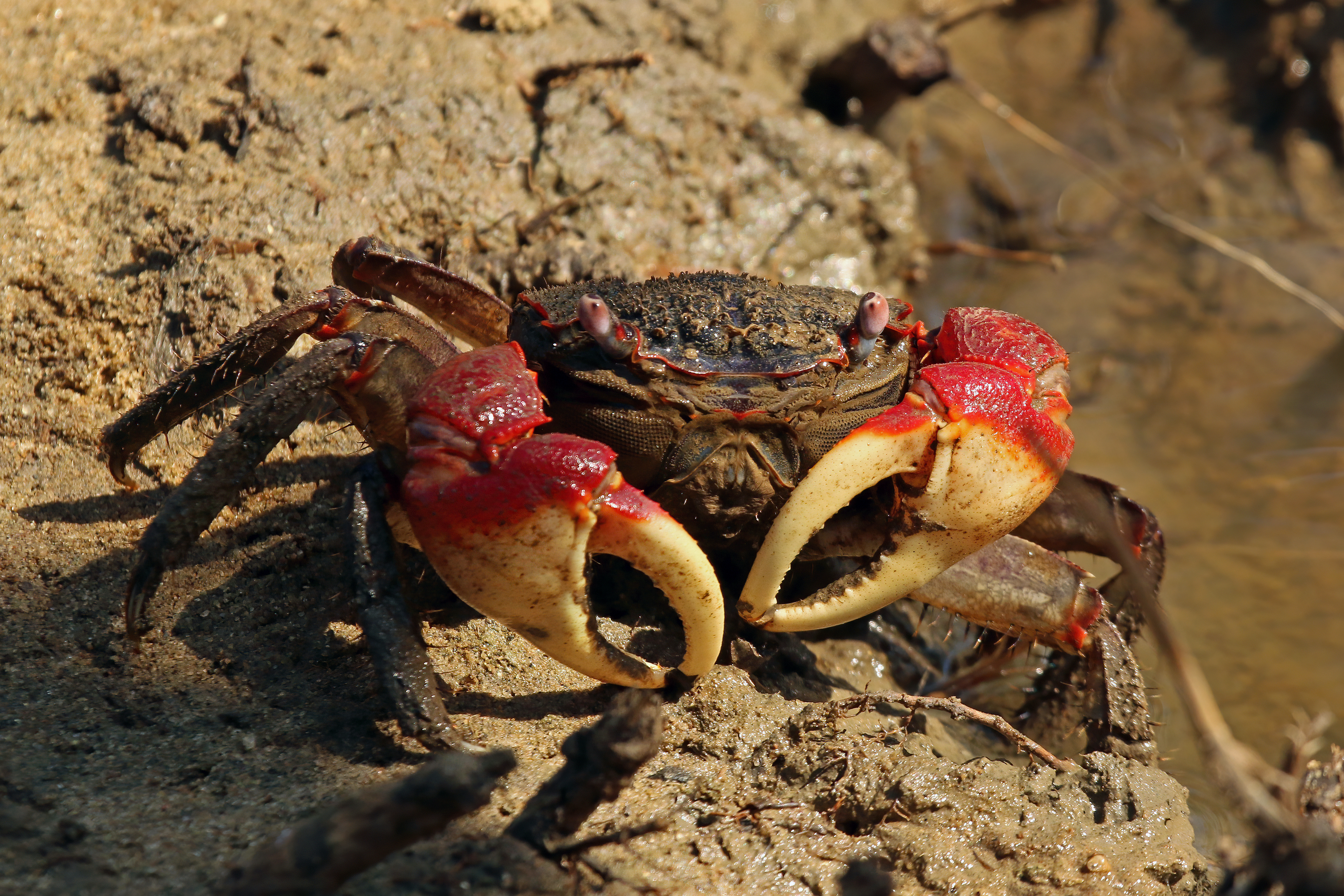
- red mangrove crab (Neosarmatium meinerti) at iSimangaliso Wetland Park, South Africa

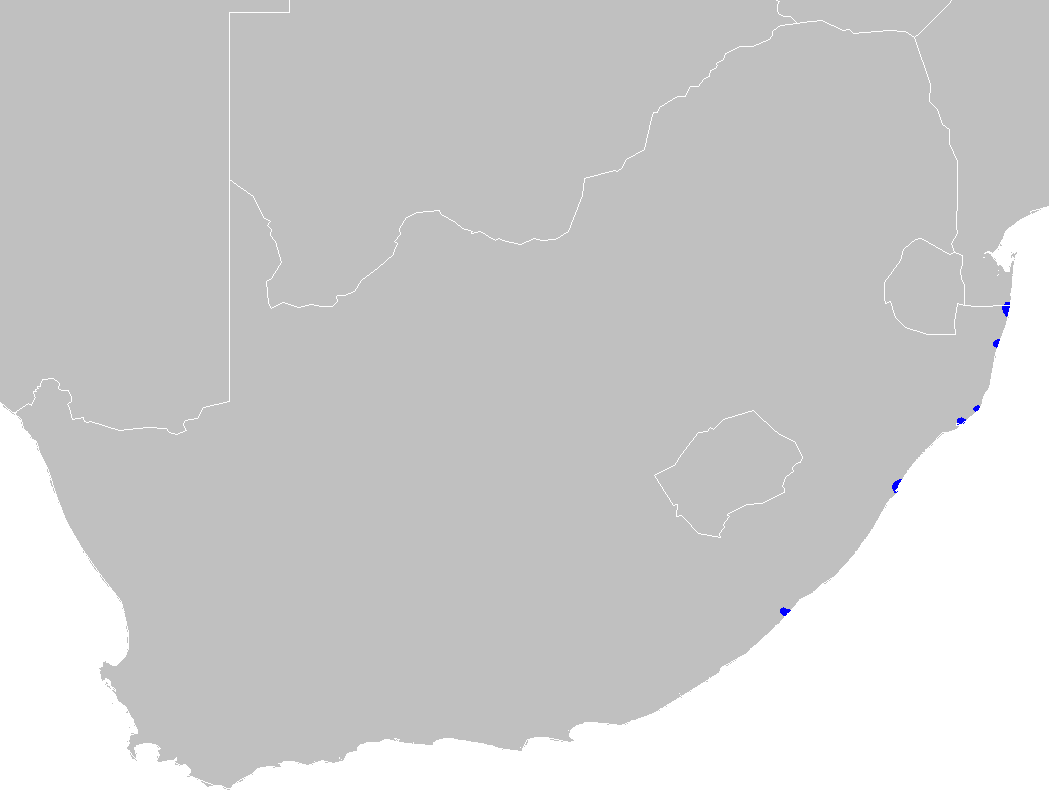
- location of the Southern Africa mangroves (in blue)

Ecology
- Realm: Afrotropical
- Biome: Mangrove

Geography
- Area: 947 km^{2} (366 mi^{2})
- Countries: South Africa; Mozambique
- Elevation: sea level

Conservation
- Protected: 229 km^{2} (24%)

The Southern Africa mangroves are mangrove ecoregion on the Mozambique's southernmost coast and the eastern coast of South Africa.

== Location and description ==
These mangroves grow in the mouths of rivers on the Indian Ocean coast of South Africa, where the sea is warmed by the Agulhas Current, in many cases they are further sheltered from the ocean by sandbanks. The largest areas are in the estuaries of the Mhlathuze River and Lake St. Lucia. Mangroves extend as far south as the Nahoon River at 32°56′S., the most southerly occurrence of mangroves in Africa.

Mangroves mostly grow in the estuaries of perennial rivers. There are approximately 1921 hectares of mangrove remaining on South Africa's coast. The largest mangrove areas are at Mhlathuze (652.1 ha), Lake St. Lucia (571 ha), Richards Bay (267 ha), Mngazana (118 ha), Mlalazi (60.7 ha), and Kosi Bay (60.7 ha), along with about a dozen smaller sites.

== Flora ==
The ecoregion is home to six mangrove species: Avicennia marina, Bruguiera gymnorhiza, Ceriops tagal, Lumnitzera racemosa, Rhizophora mucronata, and Xylocarpus granatum. Mudflats and shallows are dominated by species of Potamogeton, Ruppia, and Zostera. Beds of the seagrass Thalassodendron ciliatum are found in shallow waters.

Mangrove diversity generally increases from south to north. In the Nahoon estuary (32°56′S), only Avicennia marina, Bruguiera gymnorrhiza, and Rhizophora mucronata are present. At Kosi Bay on the South Africa–Mozambique border (27°S), six species are present – Avicennia marina, Bruguiera gymnorrhiza, Rhizophora mucronata, Ceriops tagal, Lumnitzera racemosa, and Xylocarpus granatum.

== Fauna ==
The mangroves are an important habitat for sea life, birds and animals such as turtles and crocodiles. Sea life includes fiddler crabs, mud crab (Scylla serrata), mudskippers, (Periophthalmus kalolo) and many species of sea snails and sea slugs. Some marine fishes use the mangroves as mating and spawning grounds.

Resident species of birds include the endemic mangrove kingfisher (Halcyon senegaloides). The mangroves are a breeding area for at least 48 species of birds, including lesser flamingo (Phoeniconaias minor), great white pelican (Pelecanus onocrotalus), pink-backed pelican (Pelecanus rufescens), grey-headed gull (Chroicocephalus cirrocephalus), Cape shoveler (Spatula smithii), yellow-billed duck (Anas undulata), pied avocet (Recurvirostra avosetta), saddle-billed stork (Ephippiorhychus senegalensis), yellow-billed stork (Mycteria ibis), and Caspian tern (Hydroprogne caspia).

The mangroves are also visited by large numbers of migratory bird species.

== Threats and preservation ==
Many areas of mangrove in southern Africa have been cleared for timber, urban and industrial development, including tourist facilities, and this is ongoing. Further damage to habitats is caused by pollution of rivers, while forest clearance inland causes rivers to bring down larger quantities of soils and the rivers and estuaries to be blocked.

About 24% of the ecoregion's area is protected (229 km^{2}), and another 13% is relatively intact but unprotected. Protected areas include Beachwood Mangroves Nature Reserve near Durban and iSimangaliso Wetland Park (formerly Greater St Lucia Wetland Park).
