= Marromeu Game Reserve =

- Location within Mozambique
- Location: Mozambique
- Coordinates: 18°46′16″S 35°57′03″E
- Area: 10,000 square kilometres (3,900 sq mi)

The Marromeu Game Reserve is a protected swath of 1,500 square kilometres (580 sq mi) of floodplain in the Zambezi, the only such area along the river. The reserve is characterized by vast grasslands and numerous rivers and streams. The African elephant, Lichtenstein's hartebeest, sable antelope, eland, burchell's zebra, hippopotamus, waterbuck, and reedbuck are all found there. Wild dogs, lions, leopards, cheetahs, and spotted hyenas are all predators. The Marromeu National Park is actively working to repopulate the area with buffalo after their population dwindled to 30,000. From the border of the buffalo reserve into the neighbouring Cheringoma highlands, a hunting concession of 8,252 square kilometres surrounds the Marromeu Complex, which consists of the 1,500-square-kilometer Marromeu Special Reserve. It was dedicated on 1 January 1969. It is located near Beira.

== Birdlife ==
Several species of water birds, including Great White and Pink-backed Pelicans, Yellow-billed and African Open-billed Storks, Glossy Ibis, and White-breasted Cormorants, all have substantial breeding colonies within the park, making it Mozambique's wetland with the highest water bird population density. In addition to providing a safe haven for migratory birds, the marsh serves as a breeding ground for 120 endangered Wattled Crane pairs. Other globally threatened bird species include the grey-crowned crane, the saddlebill stork, the wooly-necked stork, the goliath heron, the African skimmer, the red-winged pratincole, and the caspian tern.

== Access ==
By road from Beira.

== Climate change ==
In 2022, the IPCC Sixth Assessment Report included Marromeu Game Reserve in the list of African natural heritage sites which would be threatened by flooding and coastal erosion by the end of the century, but only if climate change followed RCP 8.5, which is the scenario of high and continually increasing greenhouse gas emissions associated with the warming of over 4 °C., and is no longer considered very likely. The other, more plausible scenarios result in lower warming levels and consequently lower sea level rise: yet, sea levels would continue to increase for about 10,000 years under all of them. Even if the warming is limited to 1.5 °C, global sea level rise is still expected to exceed 2–3 m (7–10 ft) after 2000 years (and higher warming levels will see larger increases by then), consequently exceeding 2100 levels of sea level rise under RCP 8.5 (~0.75 m (2 ft) with a range of 0.5–1 m (2–3 ft)) well before the year 4000.
