= East African mangroves =

Mangrove swamps on the Indian Ocean coast of East Africa

Coordinates: 7.3000°S 39.3600°E

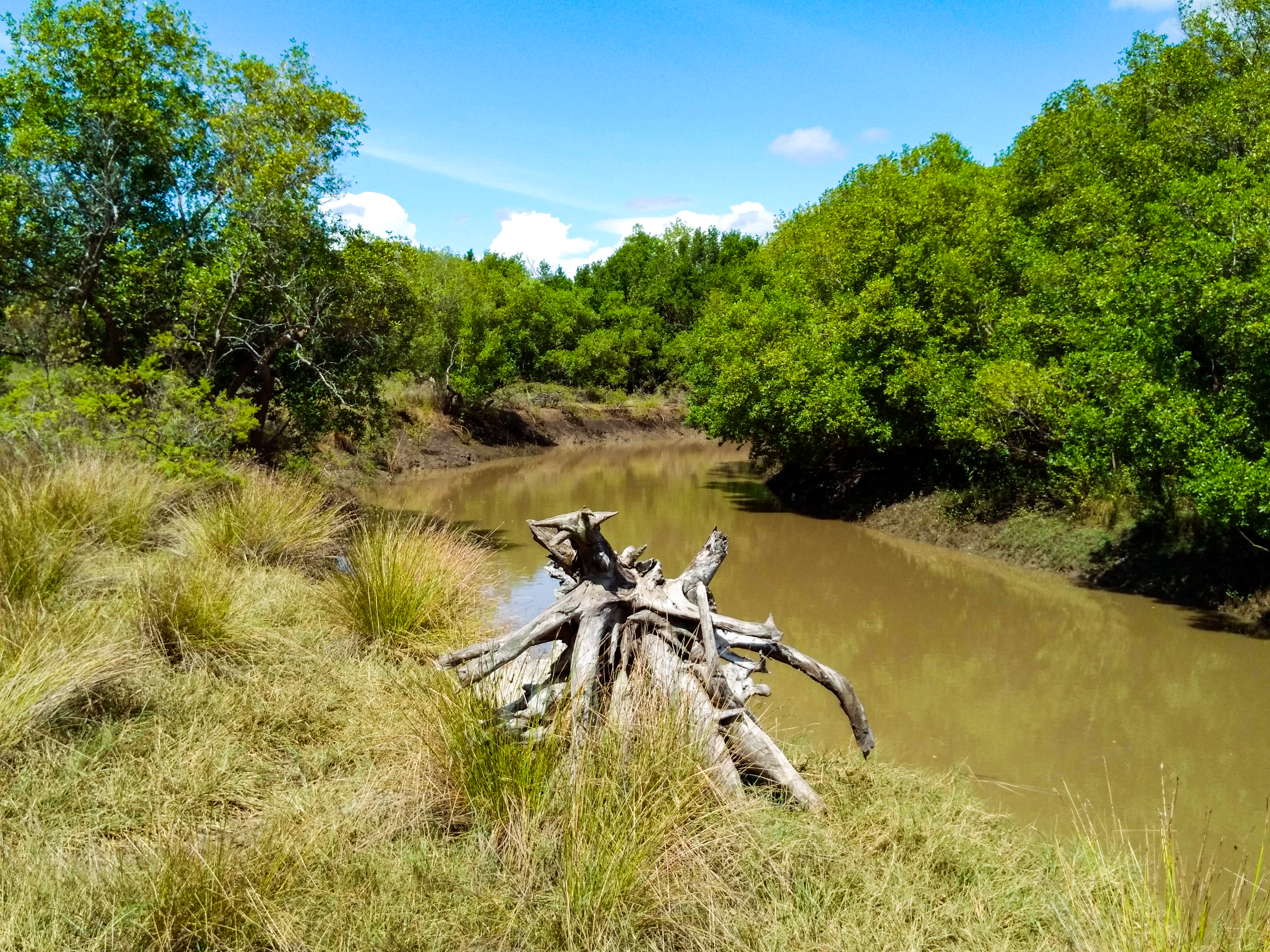
- Mangroves in Saadani National Park, Tanzania

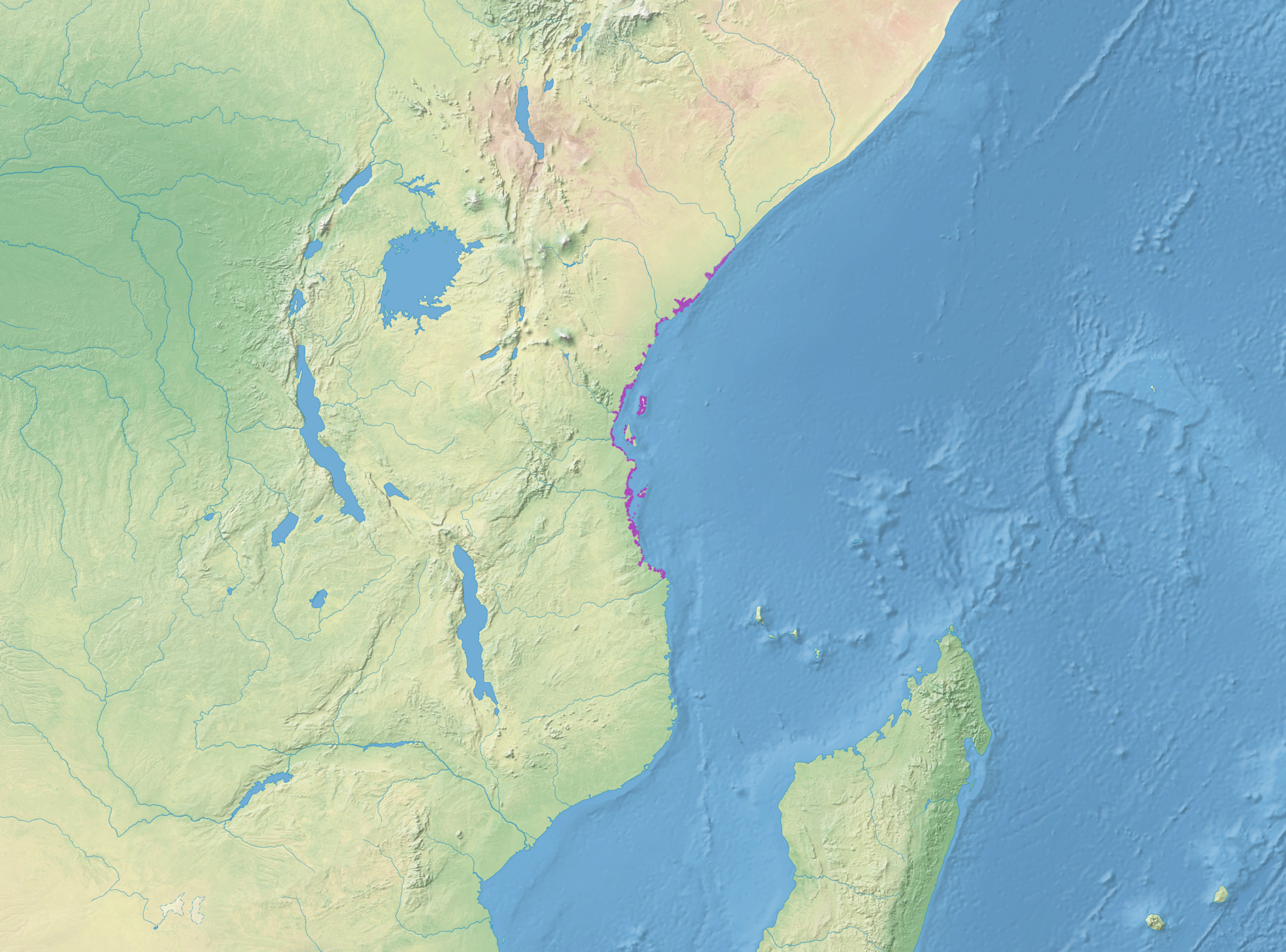
- Map of the East African mangroves (purple)

Ecology
- Realm: Afrotropical
- Biome: Mangroves
- Borders: Northern Zanzibar-Inhambane coastal forest mosaic; Southern Zanzibar-Inhambane coastal forest mosaic

Geography
- Area: 1,880 km^{2} (730 mi^{2})
- Countries: Kenya; Mozambique; Somalia, Tanzania
- Elevation: sea level

Conservation
- Conservation status: Critical/endangered
- Protected: 843 km² (45%)

The East African mangroves are a mangrove ecoregion consisting of swamps along the Indian Ocean coast of East Africa in Mozambique, Tanzania, Kenya and southern Somalia.

== Location and description ==
The ecoregion consists of two large areas of mangrove in the deltas of the Zambezi in Mozambique and the Rufiji River in Tanzania, which can extend as far as 50 km inland, as well as smaller areas along the coast. This coast experiences two monsoon seasons each year, strong ocean currents and rising seas up to 5.6m in Mozambique. Rainfall is high especially in southern Kenya and northern Tanzania.

== Flora ==
The mangroves include tall trees, up to 30m. Compared to Central African mangroves of West Africa, mangroves of East Africa have a greater variety of vegetation with two distinctive types: the mangroves on the coast itself such as the birdwatching site Mida Creek near the Arabuko Sokoke National Park and the town of Watamu, and the Lamu Archipelago both in Kenya, which are fed by constant streams of fresh water; and the mangroves in river inlets where more salt accumulates in the water. East African mangrove species are similar to those found on other coasts around the Indian Ocean. The Bazaruto Archipelago is an example of offshore mangroves sheltered by coral and intermingled with a mixture of shoreline habitats such as grassy sand dunes and rockpools.

== Fauna ==
The mangroves are an important habitat for a variety of wildlife from fish, crustaceans, and molluscs in the waters to snakes and monkeys, such as Sykes' monkey in the trees and animals including antelopes, elephants, and African buffalo who come to graze on the fringes of the swamps. Larger animals that feed in the swamp waters include hippopotamus, green turtle (Chelonia mydas), hawksbill turtle (Eretmochelys imbricata), and olive ridley (Lepidochelys olivacea) turtles, porpoises and important populations of the endangered dugong. Located alongside coral reefs, these mangroves are sheltered by the coral from ocean tides and storms, and the swamps provide food for the many fish, shrimps and other marine fauna that shelter in the coral. The swamps are also important feeding grounds for large numbers of migratory birds such as curlew sandpiper (Calidris ferruginea), little stint (Calidris minuta) and Caspian tern (Hydroprogne caspia), waterbirds such as crab-plover (Dromas ardeola), yellow-billed stork and malachite kingfisher, and seabirds such as roseate tern (Sterna dougallii).

== Threats and preservation ==
The mangroves have been harvested for timber for centuries by traders from the nearby Arabian Peninsula. All along the coast mangrove swamps have been cleared, not only for timber but for urban areas, salt panning and agriculture including rice growing and shrimp cultivation. The habitat is further diminished by pollution of rivers from urban and industrial waste and agrochemicals. Urban areas near the mangroves include: the Swahili town of Lamu, the beach town of Malindi and the large port city of Mombasa in Kenya; the port of Tanga in Tanzania; and Quelimane, the large city of Beira (famous for its prawns), Inhassoro and Vilankulo (the ports for Bazaruto), and Maxixe in Mozambique.

A 2017 assessment found that 843 km², or 45%, of the East African mangroves are in protected areas. Protected areas include Watamu Marine National Park and Ras Tenewi Marine National Park in Kenya; Mafia Island Marine Park, Jozani Chwaka Bay National Park and Saadani National Park in Tanzania; and the Bazaruto Archipelago, Inhaca and Portuguese Island, Marromeu Game Reserve, and Pomene Reserve in Mozambique. Some areas of mangrove in Kenya and Tanzania are managed as forest reserves.
