= Elasmopus leveque =

Scientific classification
- Kingdom: Animalia
- Phylum: Arthropoda
- Clade: Pancrustacea
- Class: Malacostraca
- Order: Amphipoda
- Family: Maeridae
- Genus: Elasmopus
- Species: E. leveque

Binomial name
- Elasmopus leveque Hughes & Lowry, 2011

Species of crustacean

WAM P.83326 - Holotype site: Cape Leveque

Elasmopus arafura is a marine species of amphipod in the family, Maeridae, and was first described in 2011 by Lauren E. Hughes and James K. Lowry.

It is found in the seas off Western Australia and the Northern Territory in the IMCRA regions of the Northern Shelf Province, the Northwest Shelf Province and the Central Western Province.
