= Elasmopus arafura =

Scientific classification
- Domain: Eukaryota
- Kingdom: Animalia
- Phylum: Arthropoda
- Class: Malacostraca
- Order: Amphipoda
- Family: Maeridae
- Genus: Elasmopus
- Species: E. arafura

Binomial name
- Elasmopus arafura Hughes & Lowry, 2011

Species of crustaceans

AM P.78273 - Holotype site: Oxley Island in the Arafura Sea'"`UNIQ--ref-00000006-QINU`"'

Elasmopus arafura is a marine species of amphipod in the family, Maeridae, and was first described in 2011 by Lauren E. Hughes and James K. Lowry.

It is found on reefs off the Northern Territory and Western Australia.
