= Aborolobatea insidiosa =

Scientific classification
- Kingdom: Animalia
- Phylum: Arthropoda
- Clade: Pancrustacea
- Class: Malacostraca
- Order: Amphipoda
- Family: Oedicerotidae
- Genus: Aborolobatea
- Species: A. insidiosa

Binomial name
- Aborolobatea insidiosa Hughes & Lowry, 2009

Species of crustaceans

Holotype site: One Tree Island, QLD

Aborolobatea insidiosa is a species of marine crustacean in the Oedicerotidae family, and was first described in 2009 by Lauren E. Hughes and James K. Lowry.

It is a littoral marine species found at depths of 0 to 30 m in the shallow sandy bottoms of the Great Barrier Reef.
