= Elasmopus hyperopia =

Scientific classification
- Kingdom: Animalia
- Phylum: Arthropoda
- Clade: Pancrustacea
- Class: Malacostraca
- Order: Amphipoda
- Family: Maeridae
- Genus: Elasmopus
- Species: E. hyperopia

Binomial name
- Elasmopus hyperopia Hughes & Lowry, 2011

Species of crustacean

AM P.83326 - Holotype site: Point Quobba

Elasmopus arafura is a marine species of amphipod in the family Maeridae and was first described in 2011 by Lauren E. Hughes and James K. Lowry, from a specimen collected at "The Blow-holes", Point Quobba on an exposed intertidal rock shelf.

It is found along the coastlines of Western Australia.
