= Elasmopus arrawarra =

Scientific classification
- Kingdom: Animalia
- Phylum: Arthropoda
- Clade: Pancrustacea
- Class: Malacostraca
- Order: Amphipoda
- Family: Maeridae
- Genus: Elasmopus
- Species: E. arrawarra

Binomial name
- Elasmopus arrawarra Hughes & Lowry, 2006

Species of crustaceans

AM P.78273 - Holotype site: Solitary Islands

Elasmopus arrawarra is a marine species of amphipod in the family Maeridae and was first described in 2006 by Lauren E. Hughes and James K. Lowry.

It is found on the New South Wales coastlines in littoral zone at up to 30 metres in depth, and lives on algae, sponges and ascidians.
