= Amaryllis migo =

Scientific classification
- Domain: Eukaryota
- Kingdom: Animalia
- Phylum: Arthropoda
- Class: Malacostraca
- Order: Amphipoda
- Family: Amaryllididae
- Genus: Amaryllis
- Species: A. migo

Binomial name
- Amaryllis migo Lowry & Stoddart, 2002

Species of crustacean

Holotype (AM P37173) site: Migo Island, WA'"`UNIQ--ref-00000006-QINU`"'

Amaryllis migo is a species of crustacean in the family Amaryllididae, and was first described in 2002 by James K. Lowry and Helen E. Stoddart.

It is a marine sublittoral species found in South Australia and Western Australia, in the IMCRA regions of the Southwest Shelf Province, the Great Australian Bight Shelf Transition, and the Spencer Gulf Shelf Province at depths of 5-21 m and usually amongst algae.
