= Amaryllis croca =

Scientific classification
- Kingdom: Animalia
- Phylum: Arthropoda
- Clade: Pancrustacea
- Class: Malacostraca
- Order: Amphipoda
- Family: Amaryllididae
- Genus: Amaryllis
- Species: A. croca

Binomial name
- Amaryllis croca Lowry & Stoddart, 2002

Species of crustacean

Holotype (NMV J13976) site: Hotspot Reef, near Flinders Island, SA

Amaryllis croca is a species of crustacean in the family Amaryllididae, and was first described in 2002 by James K. Lowry and Helen E. Stoddart.

It is a marine species found in the sublittoral zone in association with Bryozoans on rock faces and wharf pilings at depths of 21–31 m, on the coastlines from South Australia to New South Wales.
