= Bathyamaryllis kapala =

Scientific classification
- Kingdom: Animalia
- Phylum: Arthropoda
- Class: Malacostraca
- Order: Amphipoda
- Family: Amaryllididae
- Genus: Bathyamaryllis
- Species: B. kapala

Binomial name
- Bathyamaryllis kapala Lowry & Stoddart, 2002

Species of crustacean

(AM P36868) Holotype site'"`UNIQ--ref-00000005-QINU`"'

Bathyamaryllis kapala is a species of amphipod in the family Amaryllididae, and was first described in 2002 by James K. Lowry and Helen E. Stoddart.

Bathyamaryllis kapala occurs on the east coast of Australia. The holotype (AM P36868) is female, and was carrying 16 eggs. It was collected on a bottom trawl in 1980 by the FRV Kapala, trawling at a depth of about 900 m, off the New South Wales coast. The species is named for the vessel.
