= Central Indo-Pacific =

Biogeographic sea region

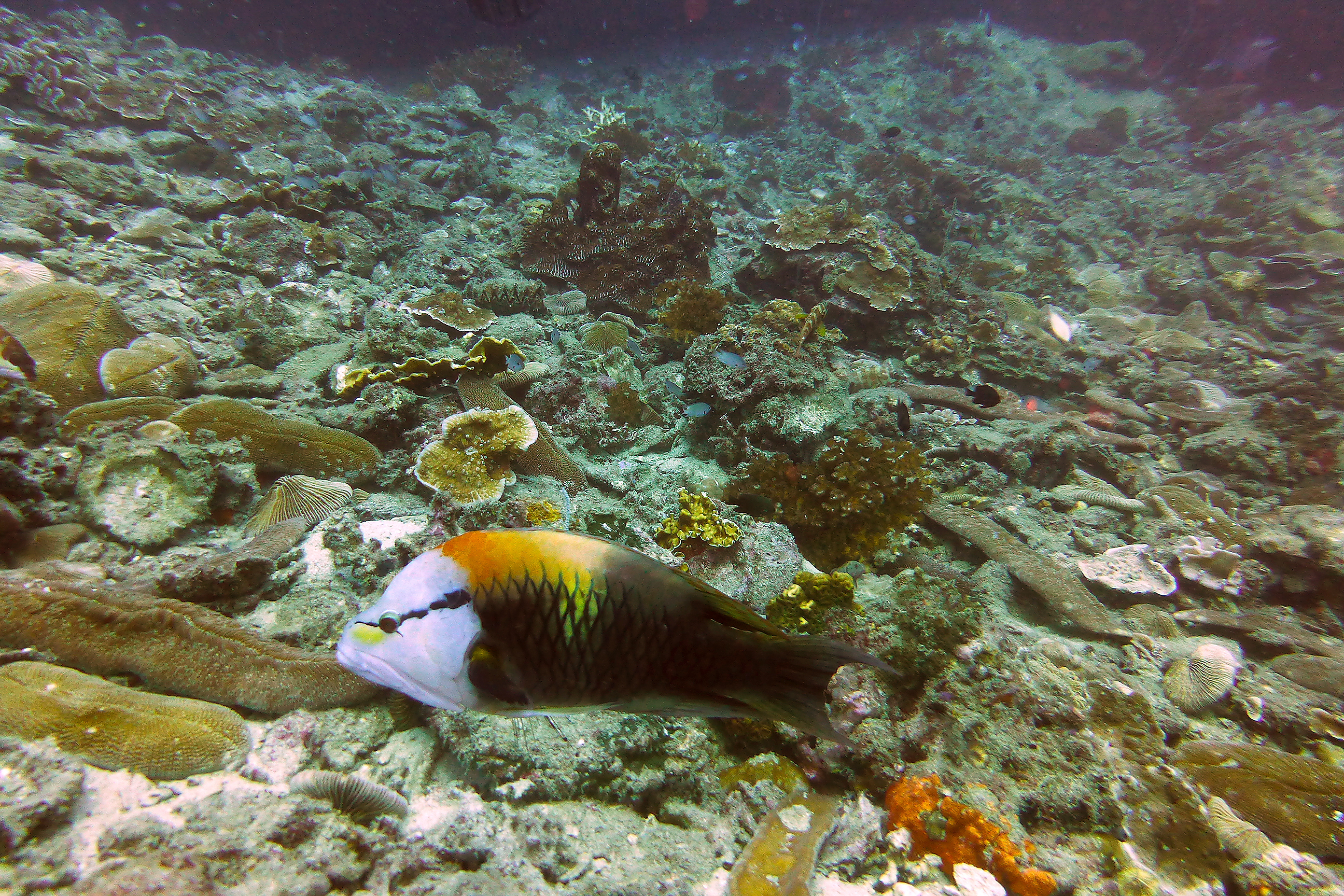
A sling-jaw wrasse off the coast of Ko Tao, Thailand

The Central Indo-Pacific is a biogeographic region of Earth's seas, comprising the tropical waters of the western Pacific Ocean, the eastern Indian Ocean, and the connecting seas.

The Central Indo-Pacific is part of the larger Indo-Pacific, which includes the tropical Indian Ocean, the western and central tropical Pacific Ocean, and the seas connecting the two in the general area of Indonesia. The Central Indo-Pacific may be classified as a marine realm, one of the great biogeographic divisions of the world's ocean basins, or as a subrealm of the Indo-Pacific.

== Location ==
The Central Indo-Pacific realm covers eastern shores of the tropical Indian Ocean, including most of the Indian Ocean coast of the Indonesian archipelago, the northern Australian coast, and the Cocos and Christmas islands. It extends through the tropical seas connecting the Pacific and Indian oceans, including the Java Sea in central Indonesia, the South China Sea between the Asian mainland and the Philippine and Malay archipelagos, and the Arafura Sea separating Australia and New Guinea. It includes the seas surrounding island groups of the western Pacific, including the Ryukyu Islands, Caroline Islands, Marianas Islands, New Guinea and the Bismarck Archipelago, Solomon Islands, Vanuatu, New Caledonia, Fiji, Tonga, and Lord Howe Island.

It is bounded on the west by the Western Indo-Pacific, with the transition at the Strait of Malacca and in southern Sumatra. The Central Indo-Pacific includes the seas surrounding the northern half of Australia, while the Temperate Australasia marine realm includes the seas surrounding the southern half of Australia. The boundaries between those two marine realms lie in Western Australia and southern Queensland. The Eastern Indo-Pacific lies to the east, extending across most of tropical Polynesia. To the north, the Taiwan Strait forms the boundary with the Temperate Northern Pacific, which also includes the larger Japanese islands.

== Coral Triangle ==
The Central Indo-Pacific includes the Coral Triangle region, which has the greatest diversity of tropical coral reef species in the world. The Coral Triangle has 605 tropical coral species, including 15 endemic species, about 76% of the world's total (798 species). The Coral Triangle has 2,228 species of reef fishes, of which 235 (7.8%) are endemic, about 37% of the world total (6000 species). It includes the largest and second-largest coral formations in the world, Australia's Great Barrier Reef and the New Caledonia Barrier Reef.

== Subdivisions ==
The Central Indo-Pacific is further subdivided into marine provinces, and the marine provinces divided into marine ecoregions:

=== South China Sea ===
- Gulf of Tonkin
- Southern China
- South China Sea Oceanic Islands

=== Sunda Shelf ===
- Gulf of Thailand
- Southern Vietnam
- Sunda Shelf/Java Sea
- Malacca Strait

=== Java Transitional ===
- Southern Java
- Cocos-Keeling/Christmas Island

=== South Kuroshio ===
- South Kuroshio

=== Tropical Northwestern Pacific ===
- Ogasawara Islands
- Mariana Islands
- East Caroline Islands
- West Caroline Islands

=== Western Coral Triangle ===
- Palawan/North Borneo
- Eastern Philippines
- Sulawesi Sea/Makassar Strait
- Halmahera
- Papua
- Banda Sea
- Lesser Sunda
- Northeast Sulawesi

=== Eastern Coral Triangle ===
- Bismarck Sea
- Solomon Archipelago
- Solomon Sea
- Southeast Papua New Guinea

=== Sahul Shelf ===
- Gulf of Papua
- Arafura Sea
- Arnhem Coast to Gulf of Carpentaria
- Bonaparte Coast

=== Northeast Australian Shelf ===
- Torres Strait and Northern Great Barrier Reef
- Central and Southern Great Barrier Reef

=== Northwest Australian Shelf ===
- Exmouth to Broome
- Ningaloo

=== Tropical Southwestern Pacific ===
- Tonga Islands
- Fiji Islands
- Vanuatu
- New Caledonia
- Coral Sea

=== Lord Howe and Norfolk Islands ===
- Lord Howe and Norfolk Islands
