= Aborolobatea paracheliformis =

Scientific classification
- Kingdom: Animalia
- Phylum: Arthropoda
- Clade: Pancrustacea
- Class: Malacostraca
- Order: Amphipoda
- Family: Oedicerotidae
- Genus: Aborolobatea
- Species: A. paracheliformis

Binomial name
- Aborolobatea paracheliformis Ledoyer, 1984

Species of crustaceans

Aborolobatea paracheliformis is a marine species of crustaceans in the Oedicerotidae family, and was first described in 1984 by French biologist Michel Ledoyer.

The type was found in the New Caledonian exclusive economic zone, and the species is found at depths of 0 to 30 m.
