= Maera irregularis =

Scientific classification
- Domain: Eukaryota
- Kingdom: Animalia
- Phylum: Arthropoda
- Class: Malacostraca
- Order: Amphipoda
- Family: Maeridae
- Genus: Maera
- Species: M. irregularis

Binomial name
- Maera irregularis Myers & Nithyanandan, 2016

Species of crustacean

Maera irregularis is a species of crustacean in the genus Maera. It lives in Kuwait.
