= Origin and dispersal of the coconut =

The origin and inter-continental dispersal of the coconut have been debated by scientists, as the species is widespread and has a complex history. It evolved in the central Indo-Pacific. It was domesticated by Austronesian peoples in Island Southeast Asia and spread during the Neolithic via their seaborne migrations as far east as the Pacific Islands, and as far west as Madagascar and the Comoros. The species played a critical role in the long sea voyages of Austronesians by providing a portable source of food and water, as well as building materials for Austronesian outrigger boats. Coconuts were spread in historic times along the coasts of the Indian and Atlantic Oceans by South Asian, Arab, and European sailors. Based on these separate introductions, coconut populations can still be divided into Pacific coconuts and Indo-Atlantic coconuts. The Indo-Atlantic type was introduced to the Americas during the colonial era in the Columbian exchange, while Austronesian sailors appear to have introduced Pacific coconuts to Panama in pre-Columbian times.

== Center of origin ==
There have been two major viewpoints on the origins of the genus Cocos: one in the Indo-Pacific, the other in South America. Modern genetic studies have identified the center of origin of the coconut as being the Central Indo-Pacific, the region between western Southeast Asia and Melanesia, where the species has its greatest genetic diversity.

Two other lines of evidence support a Central Indo-Pacific origin: linguistic and ecological:

- Linguistic evidence is provided by similarities of the local names in the Austronesian region. For example, the Polynesian and Melanesian term niu; Tagalog and Chamorro term niyog; and the Malay word nyiur or nyior.
- Ecological evidence for a Central Indo-Pacific origin includes the Indo-Pacific native range of the coconut crab; and the higher amounts of C. nucifera-specific insect pests in the region (90%) in comparison to the Americas (20%), and Africa (4%).

=== Dispersal by Austronesian peoples ===
The cultivation and spread of the coconut was closely tied to the early migrations of the Austronesian peoples who carried coconuts as canoe plants to the islands they settled.

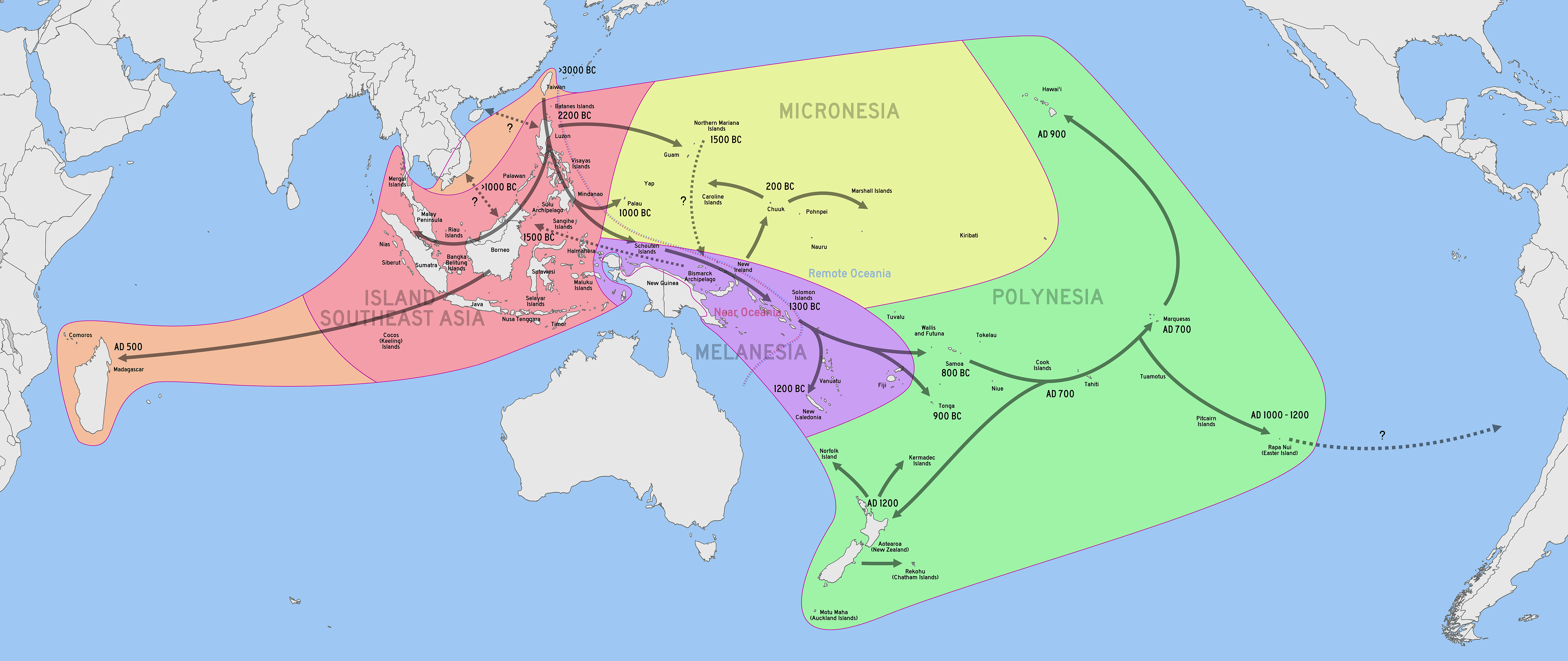
Chronological dispersal of Austronesian peoples across the Indo-Pacific

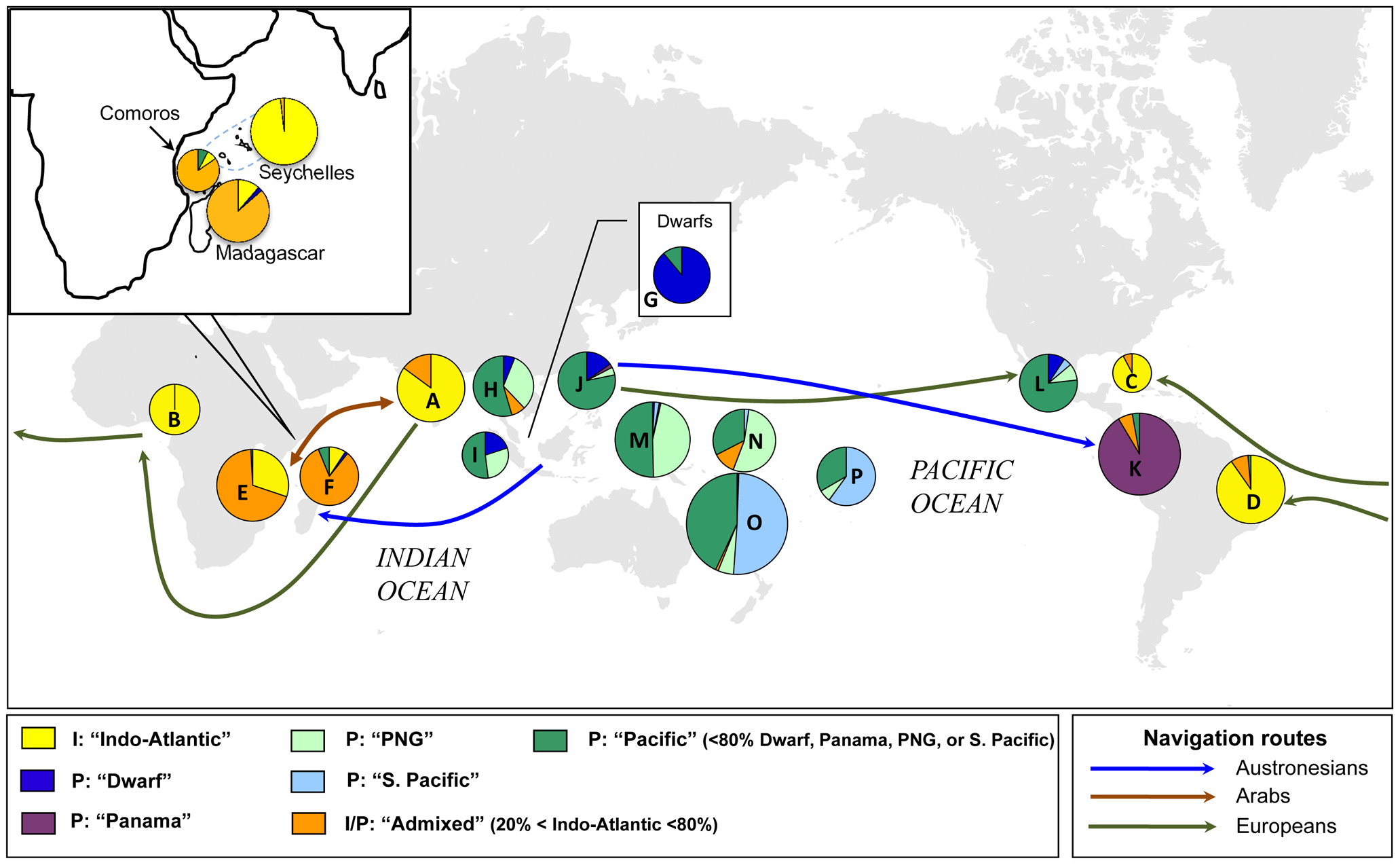
Geographical distributions of Indo-Atlantic and Pacific coconut subpopulations and their genetic composition

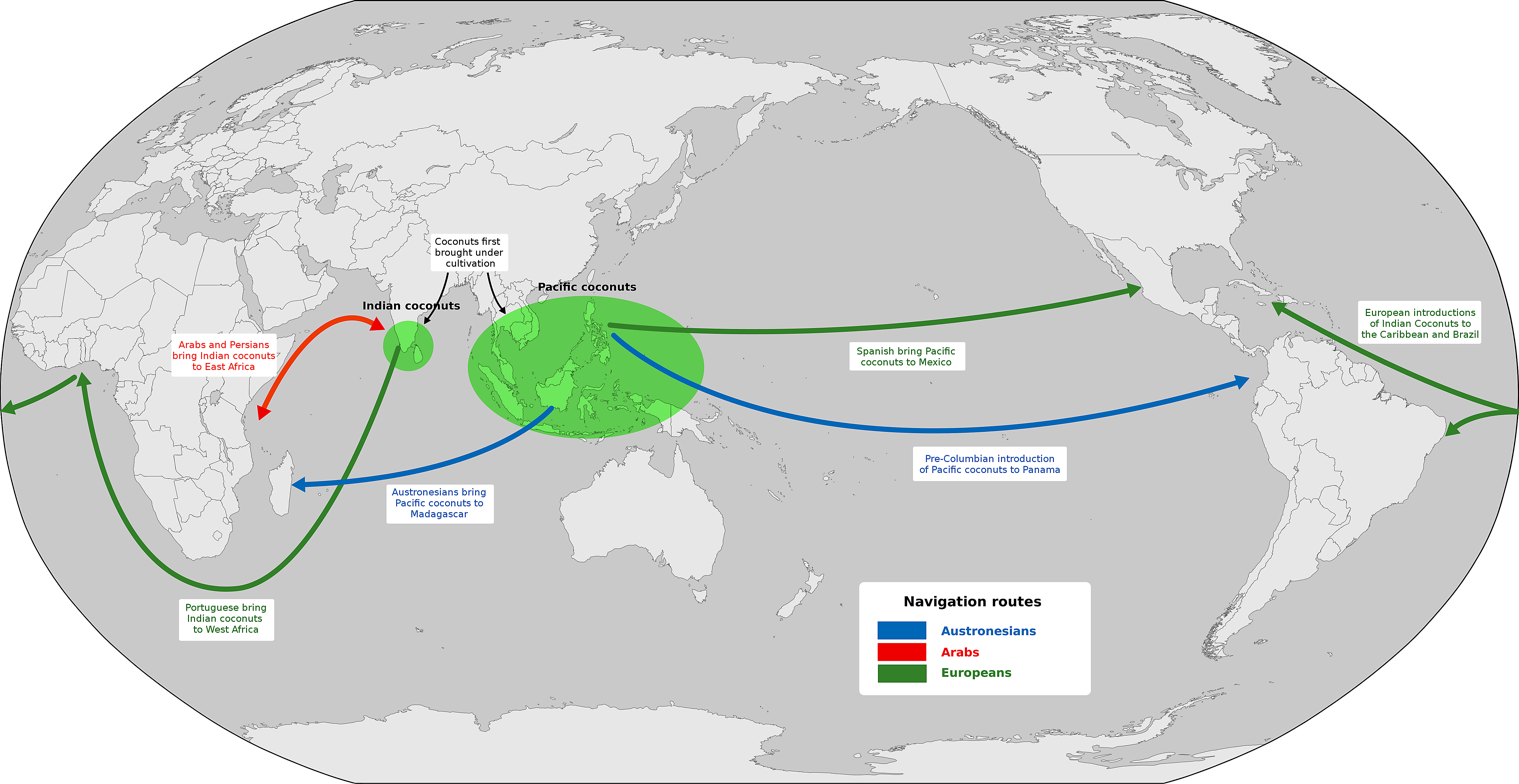
Inferred historical introduction of coconuts from the original centers of diversity in the Indian subcontinent and Island Southeast Asia

The coconut played a critical role in the migrations of the Austronesian peoples. They provided a portable source of both food and water, allowing Austronesians to survive long sea voyages to colonize new islands as well as establish long-range trade routes. Based on linguistic evidence, the absence of words for coconut in the Taiwanese Austronesian languages makes it likely that the Austronesian coconut culture developed only after Austronesians started colonizing the Philippine islands. The importance of the coconut in Austronesian cultures is evidenced by shared terminology of even very specific parts and uses of coconuts, which were carried outwards from the Philippines during the Austronesian migrations. Indo-Atlantic type coconuts were later spread by Arab and South Asian traders along the Indian Ocean basin, resulting in limited admixture with Pacific coconuts introduced earlier to Madagascar and the Comoros via the ancient Austronesian maritime trade network.

== Proposed natural intercontinental dispersal ==
Coconut fruit in the wild is light, buoyant, and highly water resistant. It has been claimed that they evolved to disperse significant distances via marine currents. C.H. Edmondson stated in 1941, on the basis of an extremely small sample, that coconuts can travel 110 days, or 5,000 km (3,000 mi), by sea and still be able to germinate. The claim is disputed. Thor Heyerdahl, based on his experience crossing the Pacific Ocean on a raft, stated that while the nuts he kept dry survived the crossing, those below deck that became wet were all ruined by salt water, and that nuts started to germinate after 70 days.

The 2014 coral atoll origin hypothesis proposed that the coconut had dispersed in an island hopping fashion using the small, sometimes transient, coral atolls. It noted that by using these small atolls, the species could easily island-hop. Over the course of evolutionary time-scales the shifting atolls would have shortened the paths of colonization, meaning that any one coconut would not have to travel very far to find new land.

Drift models based on wind and ocean currents have shown that coconuts could not have drifted across the Pacific unaided. If they were naturally distributed and had been in the Pacific for a thousand years or so, then we would expect the eastern shore of Australia, with its own islands sheltered by the Great Barrier Reef, to have been thick with coconut palms: the currents were directly into, and down along this coast. However, both James Cook and William Bligh (put adrift after the Bounty mutiny) found no sign of the nuts along this 2,000 km (1,200 mi) stretch when he needed water for his crew.

These drift models thus provide substantial circumstantial evidence that Austronesian voyagers were involved in deliberately carrying coconuts across the Pacific Ocean and that the species could not have dispersed worldwide without human agency. More recently, genomic analysis of cultivated coconut has shed light on the movement. However, admixture, the transfer of genetic material, evidently occurred between the two populations. Admixture has been limited to Madagascar and coastal east Africa, excluding the Seychelles. This pattern coincides with the known trade routes of Austronesian sailors. Additionally, a genetically distinct subpopulation of coconut on the Pacific coast of Latin America has undergone a genetic bottleneck resulting from a founder effect; its ancestral population is the Pacific coconut from the Philippines. This, together with their use of the South American sweet potato, suggests that Austronesian peoples may have sailed as far east as the Americas. In the Hawaiian Islands, the coconut is regarded as a Polynesian introduction.

== Pacific and Indo-Atlantic populations ==
A genomic study in 2011 identified two highly differentiated populations of coconuts, one originating from Island Southeast Asia (the Pacific group) and the other from the southern margins of the Indian subcontinent (the Indo-Atlantic group). The Pacific group is the only one to display clear genetic and phenotypic indications that they were domesticated; including dwarf habit, self-pollination, and the round niu vai fruit morphology with larger endosperm-to-husk ratios. The distribution of the Pacific coconuts correspond to regions settled by Austronesian voyagers indicating that its spread was largely the result of human introductions. It is most strikingly displayed in Madagascar, an island settled by Austronesian sailors at around 2000 to 1500 BP. The coconut populations on the island show genetic admixture between the two subpopulations indicating that Pacific coconuts were first brought by the Austronesian settlers, which then interbred with the later Indo-Atlantic coconuts brought by Europeans from India.

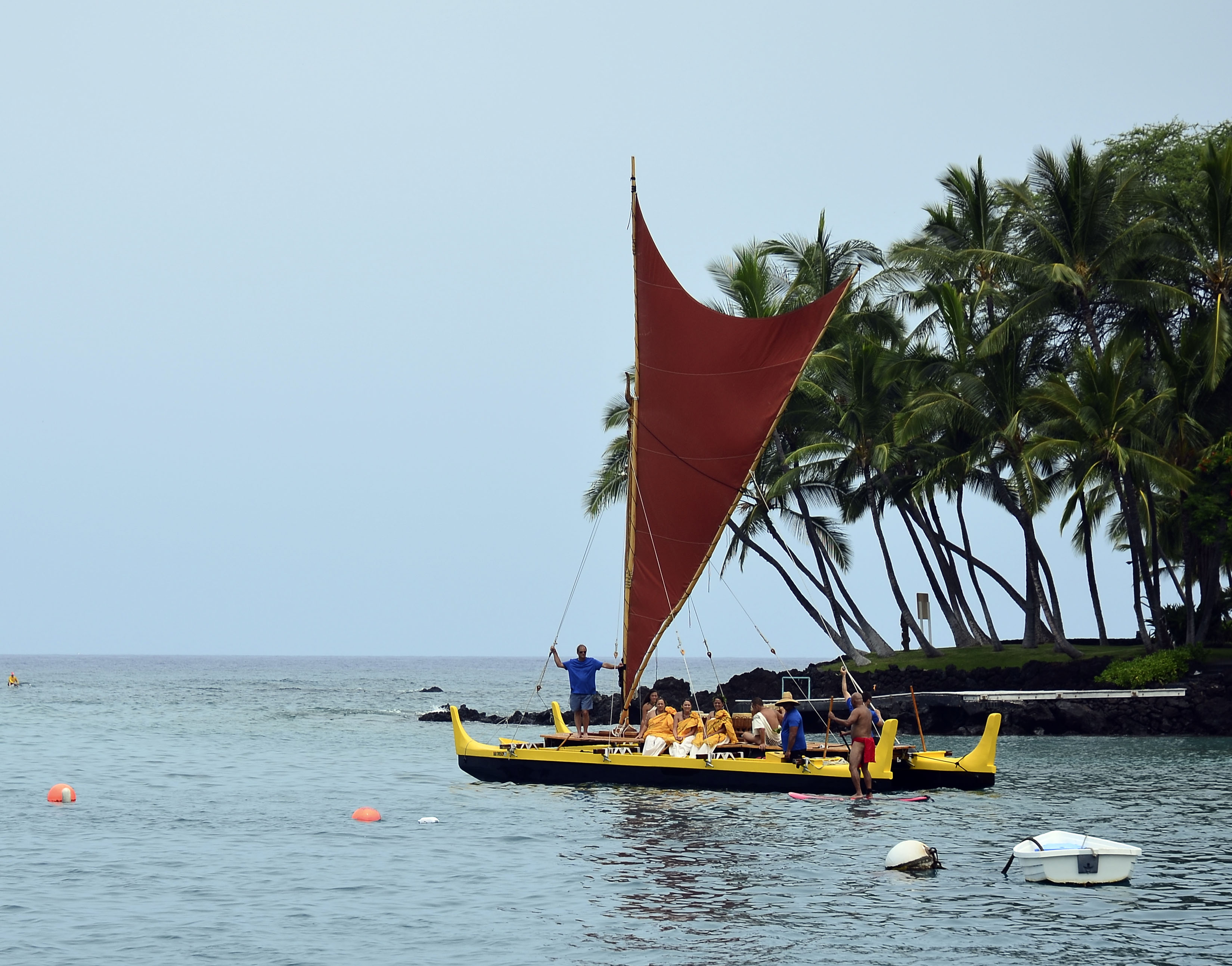
A wa'a kaulua (double-hulled canoe) from Hawaii. Catamarans were one of the early technological innovations of Austronesian peoples that allowed them to colonize the islands of the Indo-Pacific and introduce coconuts and other canoe plants along their migration routes.

Genetic studies of coconuts have confirmed pre-Columbian populations of coconuts in Panama. However, it is not native, and displays a genetic bottleneck resulting from a founder effect. A study in 2008 showed that the coconuts in the Americas are genetically closest related to the coconuts in the Philippines, and not to any other nearby coconut populations (including Polynesia). Such an origin indicates that the coconuts were not introduced naturally, such as by sea currents. The researchers concluded that it was brought by early Austronesian sailors to the Americas from at least 2,250 BP, and may be proof of pre-Columbian contact between Austronesian cultures and South American cultures. It is further strengthened by other similar botanical evidence of contact, like the pre-colonial presence of sweet potato in Oceanian cultures. During the colonial era, Pacific coconuts were further introduced to Mexico from the Spanish East Indies via the Manila galleons.

In contrast to the Pacific coconuts, Indo-Atlantic coconuts were largely spread by Arab and Persian traders into the East African coast. Indo-Atlantic coconuts were introduced into the Atlantic Ocean by Portuguese ships from their colonies in coastal India and Sri Lanka; first introduced to coastal West Africa, then onwards into the Caribbean and the east coast of Brazil. All of these introductions are within the last few centuries, relatively recent in comparison to the spread of Pacific coconuts.

Coconuts today can be grouped into two highly genetically distinct subpopulations: the Indo-Atlantic group originating from southern India and nearby regions (including Sri Lanka, the Laccadives, and the Maldives); and the Pacific group originating from the region between maritime Southeast Asia and Melanesia. Linguistic, archaeological, and genetic evidence all point to the early domestication of Pacific coconuts by the Austronesian peoples in maritime Southeast Asia during the Austronesian expansion (c. 3000 to 1500 BCE). Although archaeological remains dating to 1000 to 500 BCE suggest that the Indo-Atlantic coconuts were later independently cultivated by the Dravidian peoples, only Pacific coconuts show clear signs of domestication traits like dwarf habits, self-pollination, and rounded fruits. Indo-Atlantic coconuts, in contrast, all have the ancestral traits of tall habits and elongated triangular fruits.

Specimens have been found in the Caribbean and the Atlantic coasts of Africa and South America for less than 500 years (the Caribbean native inhabitants do not have a dialect term for them, but use the Portuguese name), but evidence of their presence on the Pacific coast of South America antedates Columbus's arrival in the Americas.

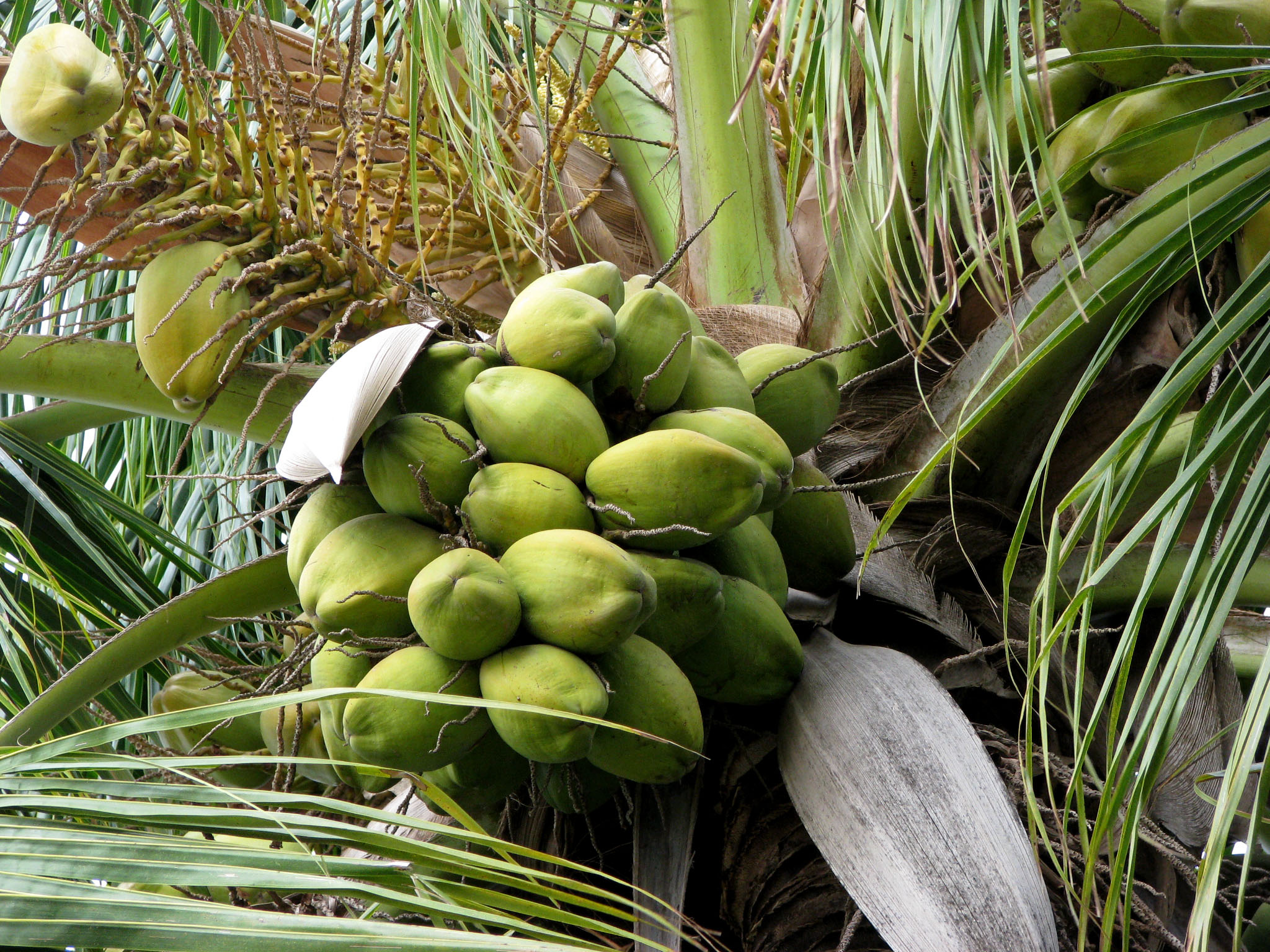
Indo-Atlantic coconut from eastern India with the elongated triangular niu kafa-type fruits

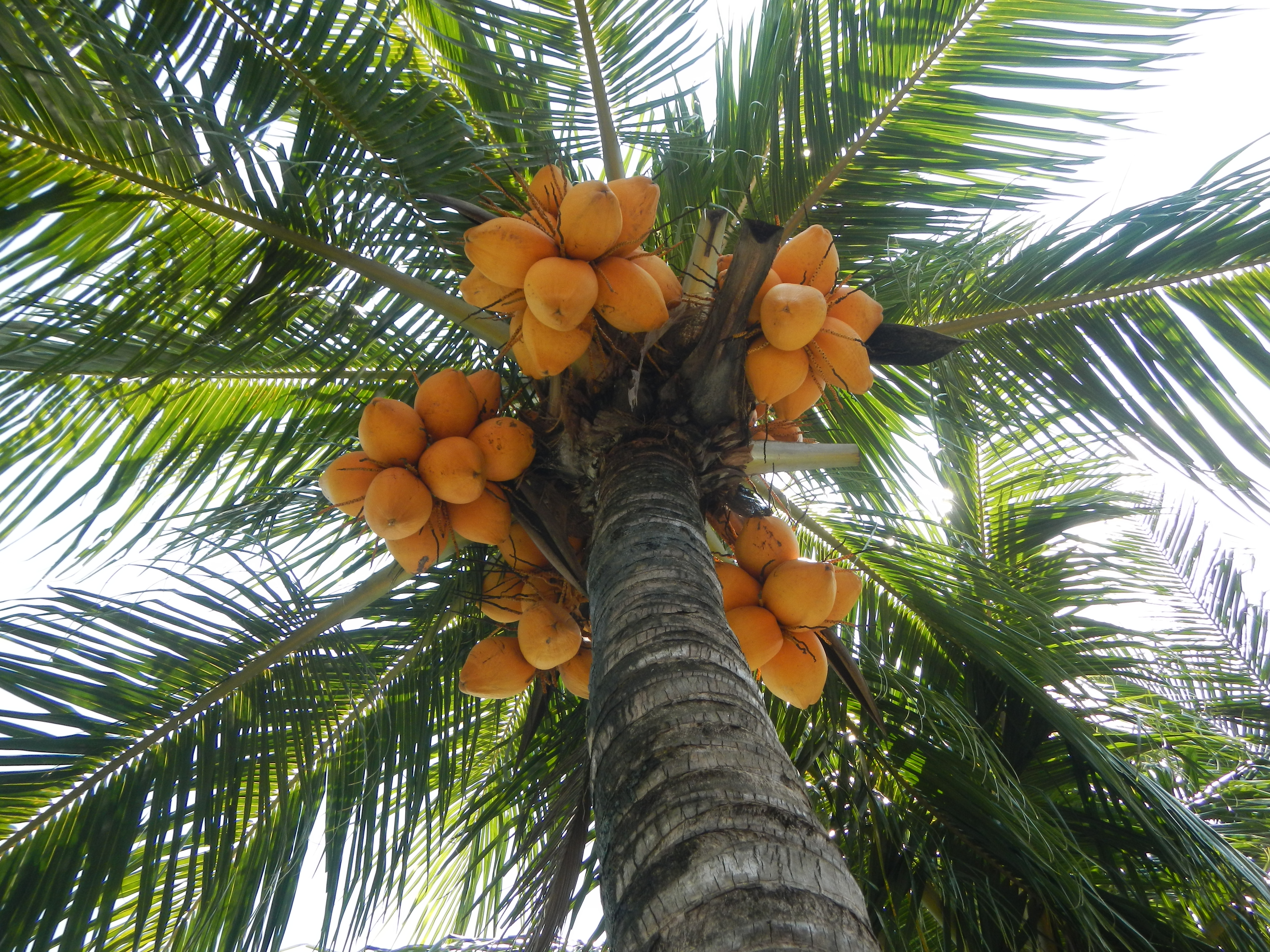
Domesticated Pacific coconut from the Philippines with bright yellow rounded niu vai-type fruits and a slow-growing dwarf habit

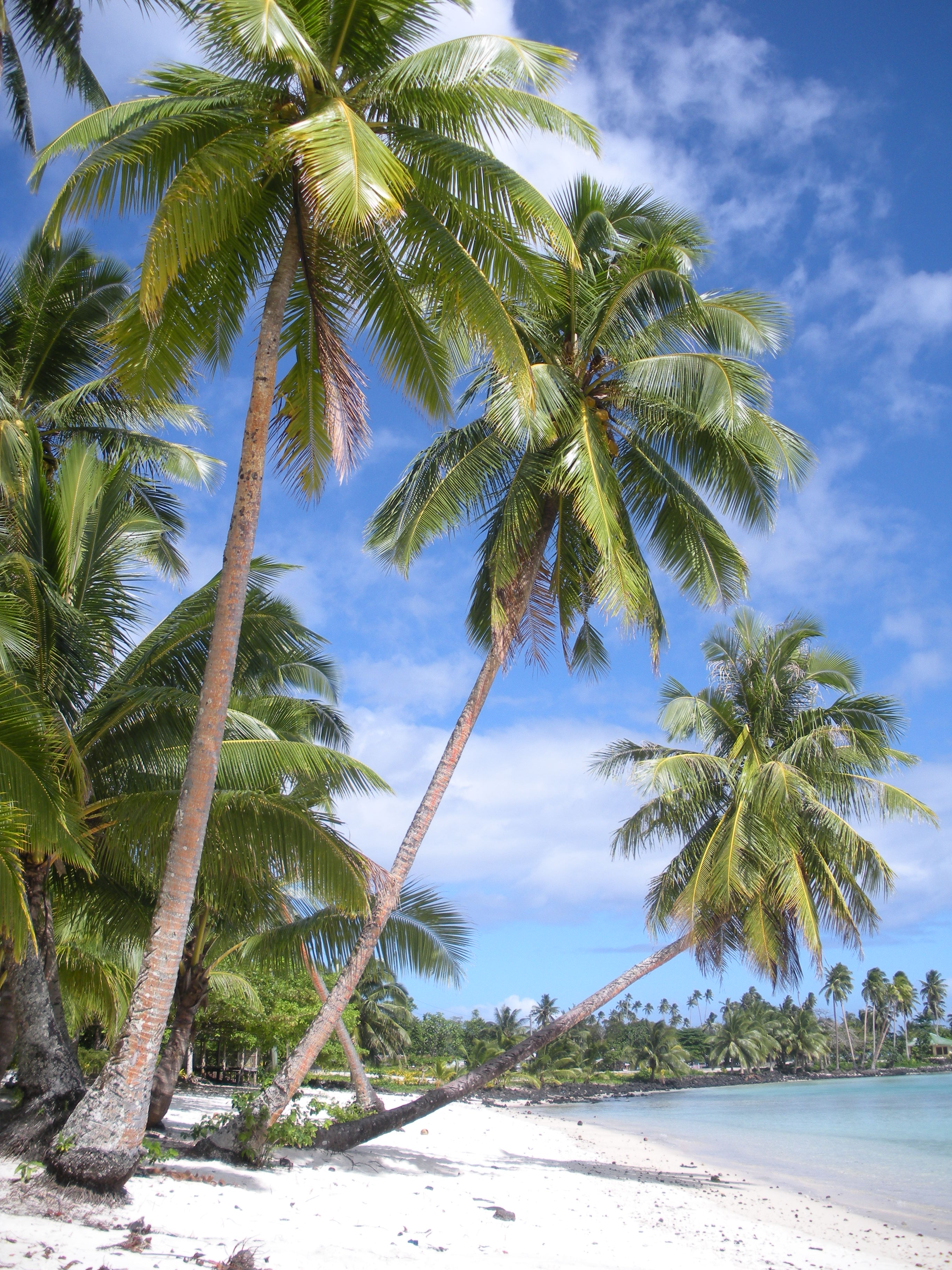
Coconut trees on a beach in Samoa

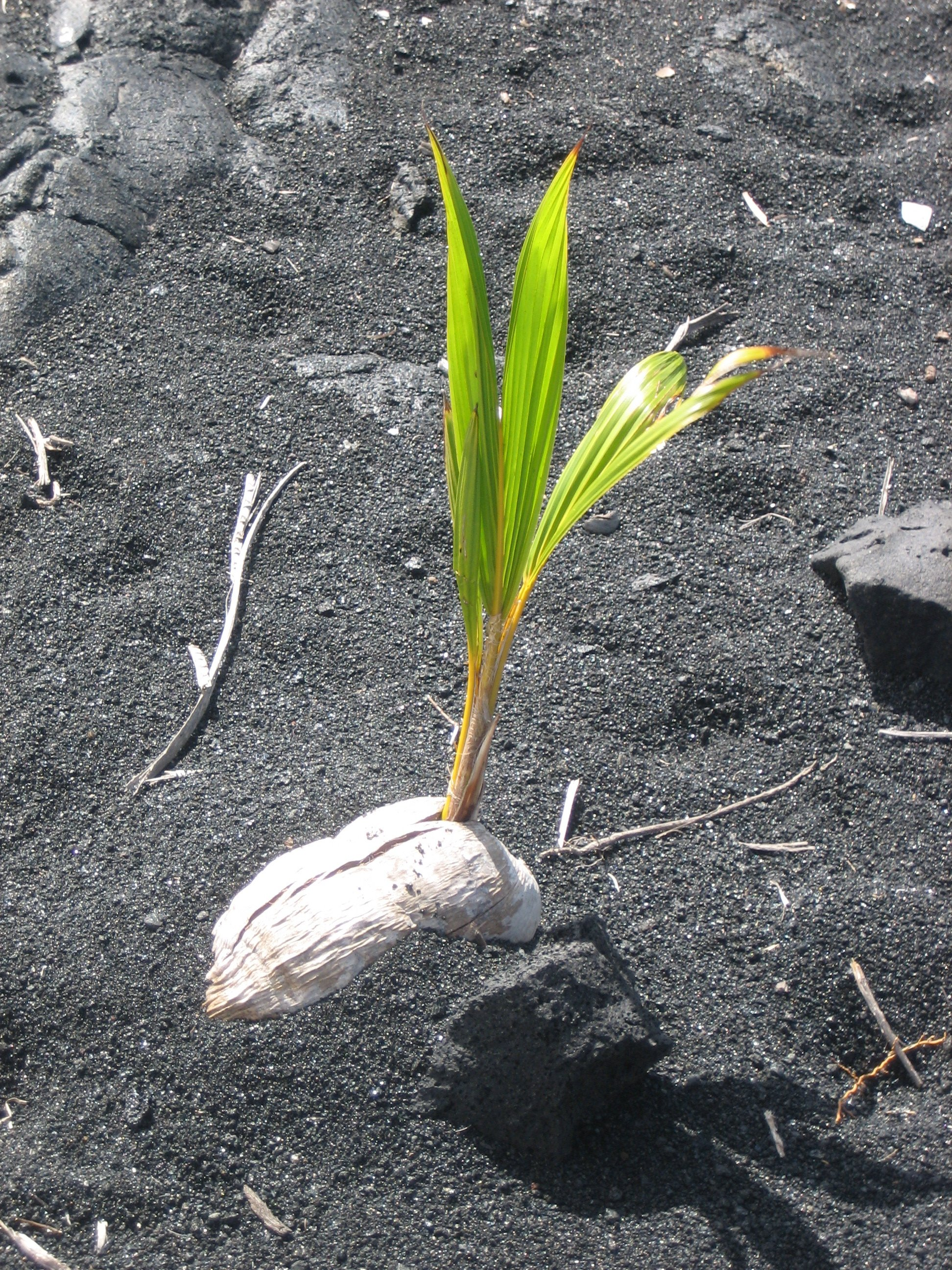
Coconut germinating on Punaluʻu Beach on the island of Hawaiʻi
