= Scopelocheiridae =

Scientific classification
- Domain: Eukaryota
- Kingdom: Animalia
- Phylum: Arthropoda
- Class: Malacostraca
- Order: Amphipoda
- Superfamily: Lysianassoidea
- Family: Scopelocheiridae; Stoddart & Lowry, 1997

Type genus
- Scopelocheirus Bate, 1857

Family of crustaceans

Scopelocheiridae is a family of crustaceans belonging to the order Amphipoda. The family was first described in 1997 by Helen E. Stoddart and James K. Lowry. The type genus is Scopelocheirus Bate, 1857.

Genera:

- Anisocallisoma Hendrycks & Conlan, 2003
- Aroui Chevreux, 1911
- Austrocallisoma Kilgallen & Lowry, 2015
- Bathycallisoma Dahl, 1959
- Eucallisoma J.L.Barnard, 1961
- Haptocallisoma Horton & Thurston, 2015
- Paracallisoma Chevreux, 1903
- Paracallisomopsis Gurjanova, 1962
- Pseudocallisoma Horton & Thurston, 2015
- Scopelocheiropsis Schellenberg, 1926
- Scopelocheirus Spence Bate, 1857
- Tayabasa Kilgallen & Lowry, 2015
