= Aristiidae =

Scientific classification
- Kingdom: Animalia
- Phylum: Arthropoda
- Class: Malacostraca
- Order: Amphipoda
- Superfamily: Aristioidea
- Family: Aristiidae; Lowry & Stoddart, 1997

Family of crustaceans

Aristiidae is a family of marine crustaceans belonging to the order Amphipoda. The family has a cosmopolitan distribution.

== Genera ==
There are five genera:

- Aristias Boeck, 1871
- Boca Lowry & Stoddart, 1997
- Memana Stoddart & Lowry, 2010
- Perrierella Chevreux & Bouvier, 1892
- Pratinas Stoddart & Lowry, 2010
