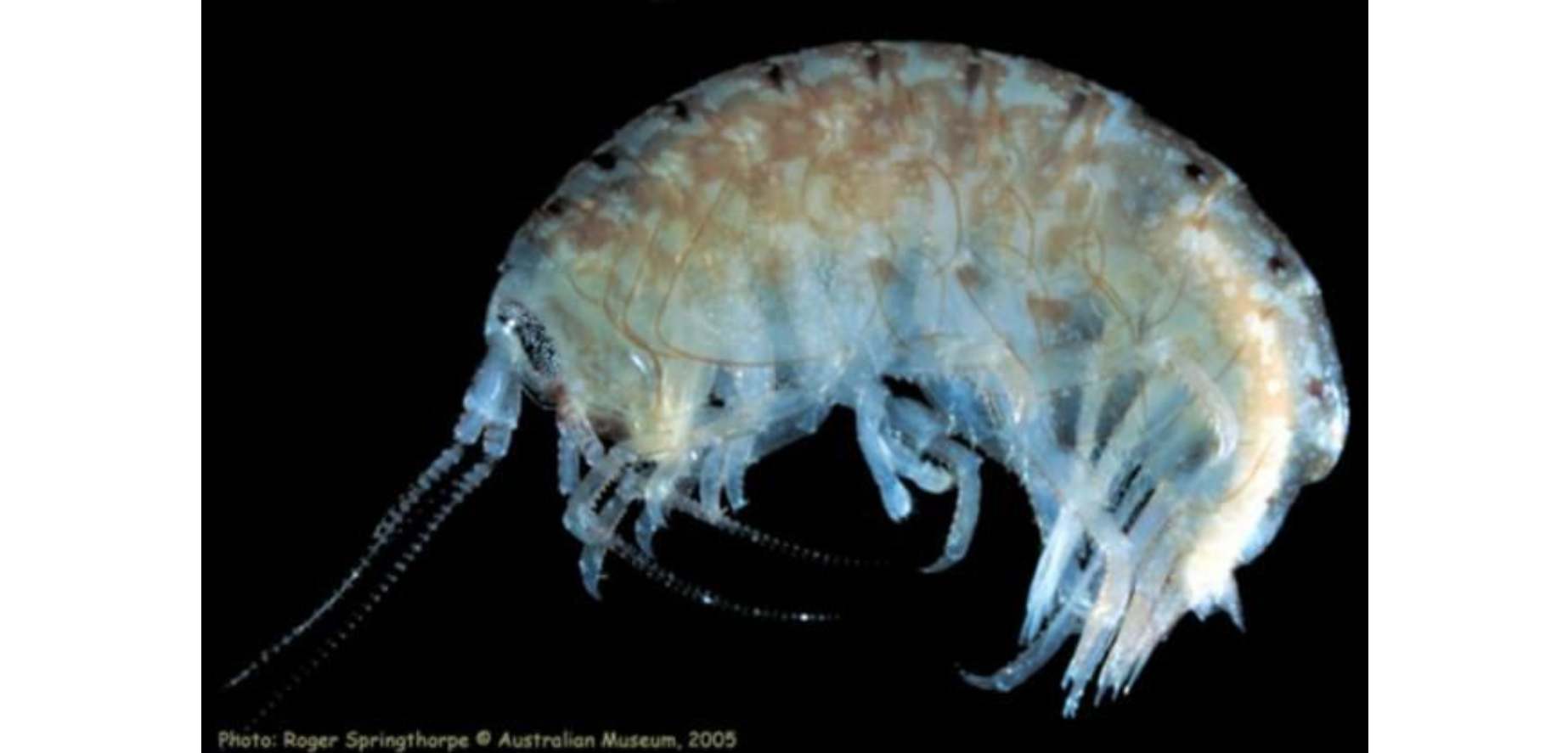
- AM P.73747

Scientific classification
- Domain: Eukaryota
- Kingdom: Animalia
- Phylum: Arthropoda
- Class: Malacostraca
- Order: Amphipoda
- Family: Amaryllididae
- Genus: Amaryllis
- Species: A. carrascoi

Binomial name
- Amaryllis carrascoi Lowry & Stoddart, 2002

= Amaryllis carrascoi =

Species of crustacean

Holotype (NMV J13954) site: Flinders Island, SA'"`UNIQ--ref-0000000A-QINU`"'

Amaryllis carrascoi is a species of crustacean in the family Amaryllididae, and was first described in 2002 by James K. Lowry and Helen E. Stoddart.

It is found on the southern coastlines of Australia, from Botany Bay, New South Wales to King George Sound, Western Australia, in sublittoral zones and generally in shallow water (1 - 30 m depth), and in association with algae, sea grasses and bryozoans or on sands.
