= Aborolobatea =

Scientific classification
- Kingdom: Animalia
- Phylum: Arthropoda
- Clade: Pancrustacea
- Class: Malacostraca
- Order: Amphipoda
- Family: Oedicerotidae
- Genus: Aborolobatea; Ledoyer, 1984

Type species
- Aborolobatea paracheliformis Ledoyer, 1984

Genus of crustaceans

Aborolobatea is a genus of crustaceans in the Oedicerotidae family, and was first described in 1984 by Michel Ledoyer.

In Australia, species of this genus are found in the IMCRA regions of the Northeast Shelf Province and the Northeast Shelf Transition.

There are two species in this genus:

- Aborolobatea insidiosa Hughes & Lowry, 2009
- Aborolobatea paracheliformis Ledoyer, 1984.
