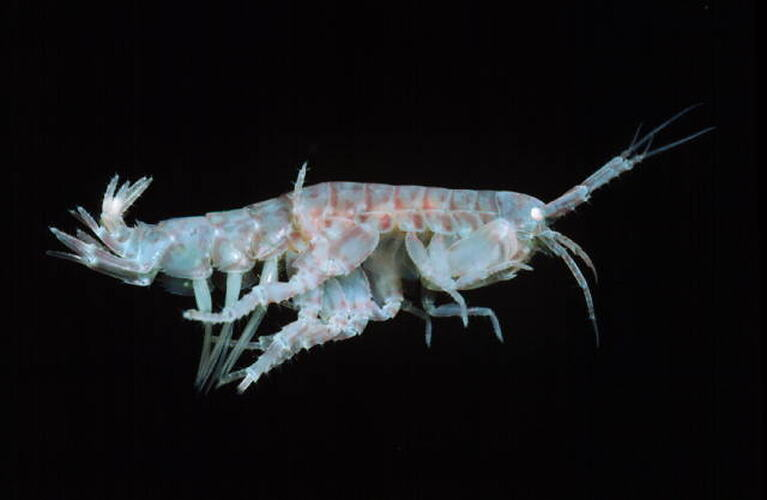

Scientific classification
- Domain: Eukaryota
- Kingdom: Animalia
- Phylum: Arthropoda
- Class: Malacostraca
- Order: Amphipoda
- Family: Maeridae
- Genus: Ceradocus
- Species: C. sellickensis

Binomial name
- Ceradocus sellickensis Sheard, 1939

= Ceradocus sellickensis =

Species of crustacean

Ceradocus sellickensis is a species of amphipod in the subgenus, Denticeradocus, and the family, Maeridae, and was first described in 1939 by Keith Sheard. The holotype (now lost) was collected at Sellicks Beach, in Gulf St Vincent. The species is endemic to Australia, and found only in South Australia.
