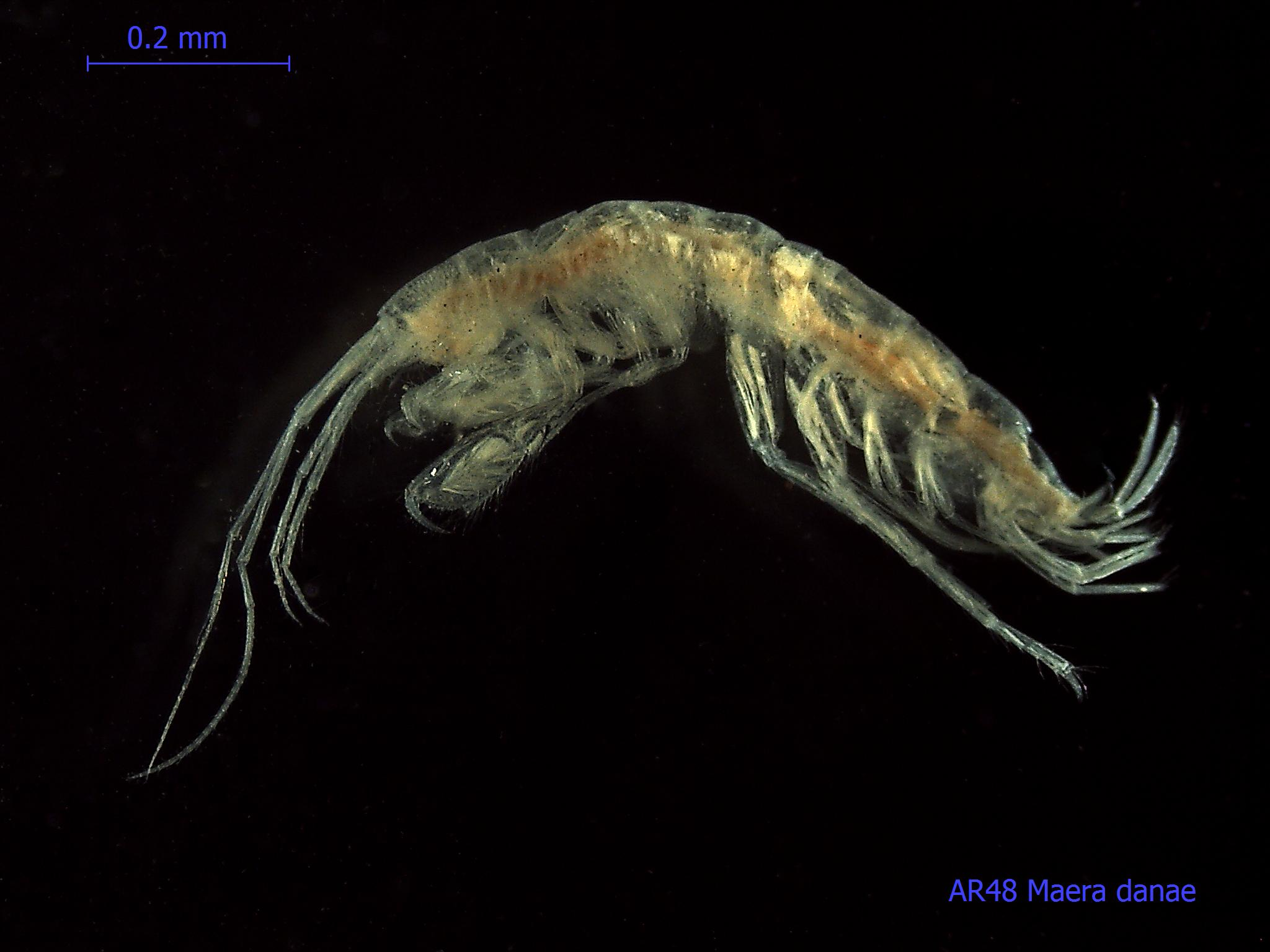

Scientific classification
- Domain: Eukaryota
- Kingdom: Animalia
- Phylum: Arthropoda
- Class: Malacostraca
- Order: Amphipoda
- Family: Maeridae
- Genus: Maera
- Species: M. danae

Binomial name
- Maera danae (Stimpson, 1853)

Synonyms
- Maera dubia Calman, 1898; Maera prionochira Bruggen, 1907

= Maera danae =

Species of crustacean

Maera danae is a species of crustacean in the genus Maera. It is found in the Western Atlantic Ocean off the coast of Eastern Canada.

It was first described in 1853 by William Stimpson as Leptothoe danae.
