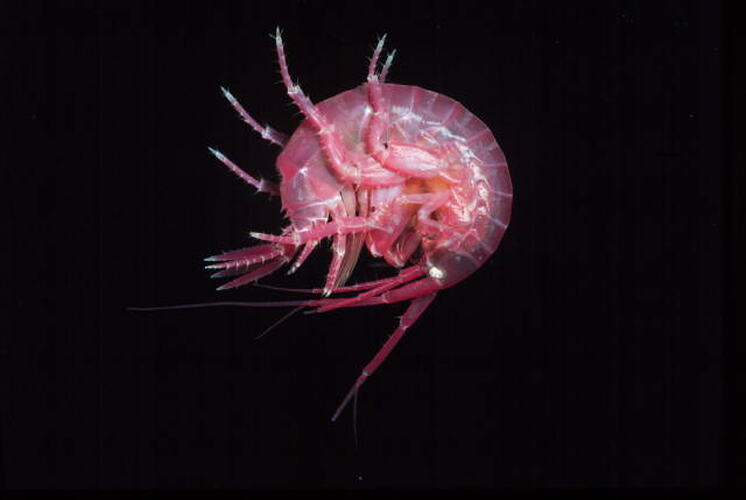
- NMV J 24127

Scientific classification
- Kingdom: Animalia
- Phylum: Arthropoda
- Clade: Pancrustacea
- Class: Malacostraca
- Order: Amphipoda
- Family: Maeridae
- Genus: Ceradocus
- Species: C. dooliba

Binomial name
- Ceradocus dooliba J.L. Barnard, 1972

= Ceradocus dooliba =

Species of crustacean

Ceradocus dooliba is a species of amphipod in the subgenus, Denticeradocus, and the family, Maeridae, and was first described in 1972 by Jerry Laurens Barnard. The holotype was collected at Capel Sound in Port Phillip Bay, in the sublittoral zone.
