= Northwest Shelf Transition =

Biogeographic region in Australia

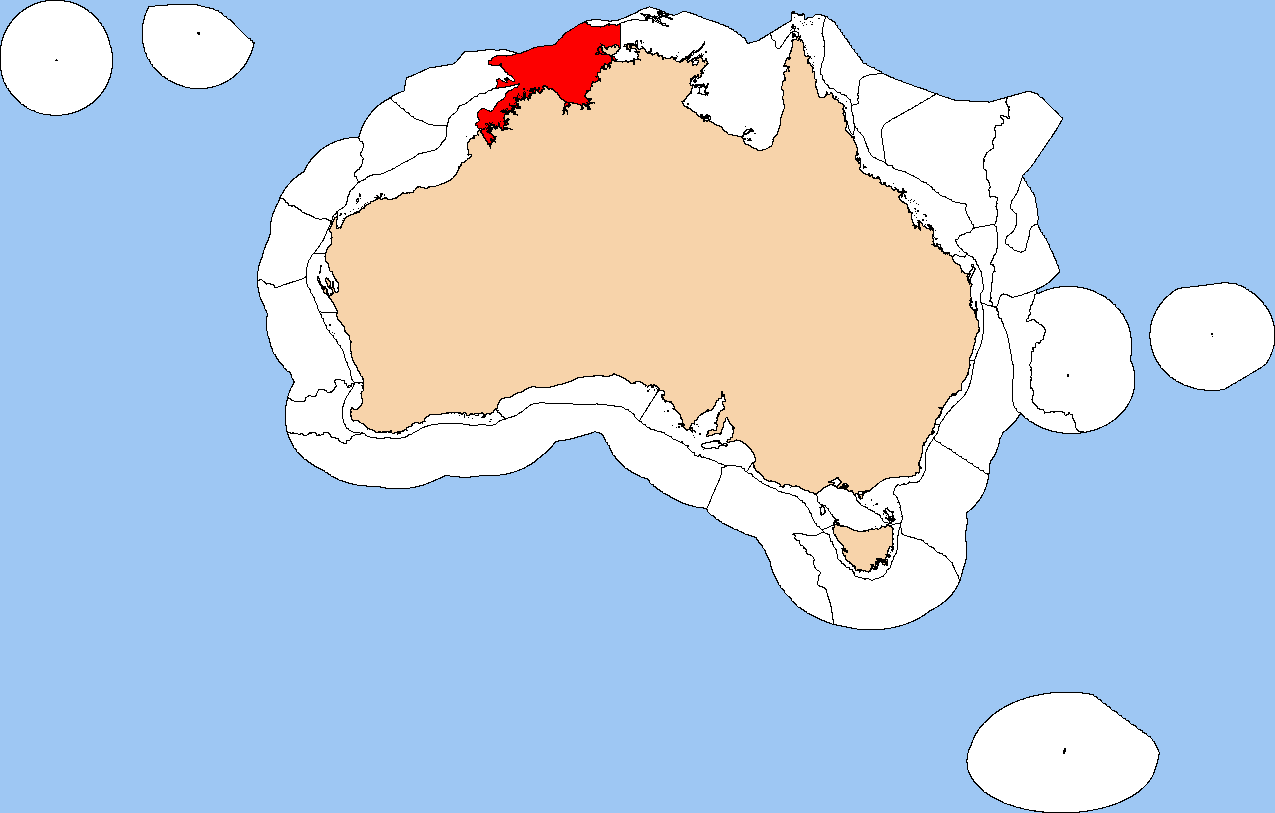
Map of the Northwest Shelf Transition

The Northwest Shelf Transition, also known as Bonaparte Coast, is a biogeographic region of Australia's continental shelf. It adjoins the Kimberley region of Western Australia and the adjacent coast of the Northern Territory.

== Geography ==
The Northwest Shelf Transition includes the coastal waters and continental shelf of northeastern Western Australia and the northwestern Northern Territory, between Cape Leveque and the Tiwi Islands. It has an area of 305,463 km^{2}, extending from the shore to 330 metres depth. Most of the region ranges from 10 to 100 metres depth.

The Northwest Shelf Province lies to the west, and the Northern Shelf Province to the east. The continental slope and deep ocean waters of the Timor Sea lie to the north.

== Oceanography ==
The waters are tropical. Surface waters are generally from the Indonesian Throughflow. The shoreline is complex, with rocky headlands, embayments, beaches, estuaries, and offshore islands. The seafloor is also complex, with submerged terraces, carbonate banks, pinnacles, reefs, and sand banks.

== Ecology ==
Sea life is typical of the tropical Central Indo-Pacific marine realm. Habitats include soft-bottom (sand and mud) and harder (rock) substrates. Coral reefs are uncommon.

The carbonate banks and pinnacles of the Joseph Bonaparte Gulf form habitats distinct from others in the region, and support high diversity of marine species including sponge gardens and octocorals. The carbonate banks are home to Olive ridley turtles, olive sea snake (Aipysurus laevis) and turtle-headed sea snake (Emydocephalus annulatus), and attract large fish like mackerel, red snapper (Lutjanus erythropterus), and goldband snapper (Pristipomoides multidens).

The Western Australian population of humpback whales (Megaptera novaeangliae) mate and give birth in the bays along the Kimberley coast during the winter months, before migrating south along the Western Australian coast to their summer feeding grounds in the Southern Ocean.

== Meso-scale bioregions ==
The Integrated Marine and Coastal Regionalisation of Australia (IMCRA) identifies six distinct meso-scale bioregions that make up the province.

- Kimberley (KIM)
- King Sound (KSD)
- Anson Beagle (ANB)
- Cambridge-Bonaparte (CAB)
- Bonaparte Gulf (BON)
- Tiwi (TWI)
