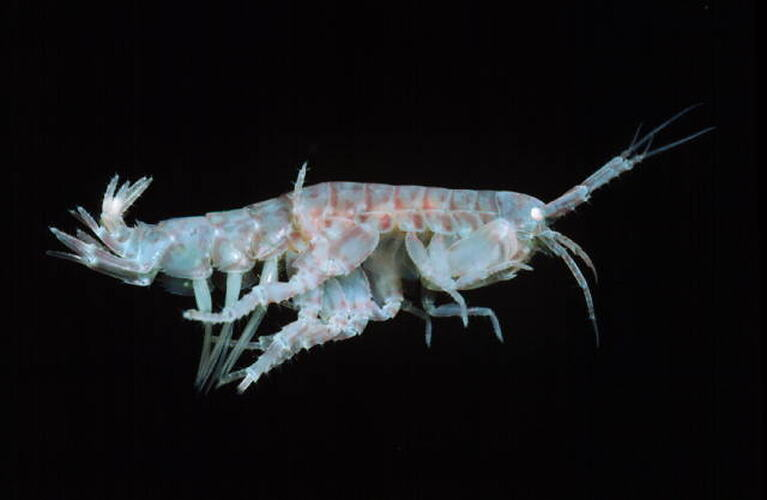
- Ceradocus sellickensis (male)

Scientific classification
- Domain: Eukaryota
- Kingdom: Animalia
- Phylum: Arthropoda
- Class: Malacostraca
- Order: Amphipoda
- Family: Maeridae
- Genus: Ceradocus; Costa, 1853

Type species
- Ceradocus orchestiipes Costa, 1853

= Ceradocus =

Genus of crustaceans

Ceradocus is a genus of amphipods in the family, Maeridae, and was first described in 1853 by Achille Costa. The type species is Ceradocus orchestiipes.

== Species ==
Species accepted by WoRMS
in the subgenus Ceradocus:

- Ceradocus laevis Oleröd, 1970
- Ceradocus oliveri Appadoo & Myers, 2006
- Ceradocus orchestiipes Costa, 1853
- Ceradocus wooree Berents, 1983

in the subgenus Ceradocus (Denticeradocus) Sheard, 1939

- Ceradocus alama Myers & Nithyanandan, 2016
- Ceradocus circe Lowry & Springthorpe, 2005
- Ceradocus cotonensis Appadoo & Myers, 2006
- Ceradocus crenatipalma Ledoyer, 1979
- Ceradocus dooliba J.L. Barnard, 1972
- Ceradocus greeni Appadoo & Myers, 2005
- Ceradocus hawaiensis J.L. Barnard, 1955
- Ceradocus inermis Hirayama, 1986
- Ceradocus isimangaliso Milne & Griffiths, 2013
- Ceradocus koreanus Kim & Kim, 1989
- Ceradocus mahafalensis Ledoyer, 1979
- Ceradocus oxyodus Berents, 1983
- Ceradocus paucidentatus J.L. Barnard, 1952
- Ceradocus ramsayi (Haswell, 1879)
- Ceradocus rubromaculatus (Stimpson, 1855)
- Ceradocus serratus (Spence Bate, 1862)
- Ceradocus sheardi Shoemaker, 1948
- Ceradocus shoalsi Appadoo & Myers, 2006
- Ceradocus spinifer Ledoyer, 1973
- Ceradocus vaderi Alves, Johnsson & Senna, 2019
- Ceradocus yandala Berents, 1983

Species not allocated to a subgenus:

- Ceradocus adangensis Wongkamhaeng & Boonyanusith, 2016
- Ceradocus andamanensis Wongkamhaeng, Coleman & Pholpunthin, 2013
- Ceradocus baudini Hughes, 2016
- Ceradocus breweri (Kunkel, 1910)
- Ceradocus capensis Sheard, 1939
- Ceradocus chevreuxi Sheard, 1939
- Ceradocus chiltoni Sheard, 1939
- Ceradocus colei Kunkel, 1910
- Ceradocus diversimanus (Miers, 1884)
- Ceradocus kiiensis Ariyama, 2019
- Ceradocus mizani Lim, Azman & Othman, 2010
- Ceradocus multidentatus Dang & Le, 2011
- Ceradocus nanhaiensis Ren, 2012
- Ceradocus natalensis Griffiths, 1974
- Ceradocus nghisonensis Dang & Le, 2011
- Ceradocus parkeri Kunkel, 1910
- Ceradocus sellickensis Sheard, 1939
- Ceradocus setosus Dang & Le, 2011
- Ceradocus shoemakeri Fox, 1973
- Ceradocus spinicauda (Holmes, 1908)
- Ceradocus tattersalli Ledoyer, 1982
