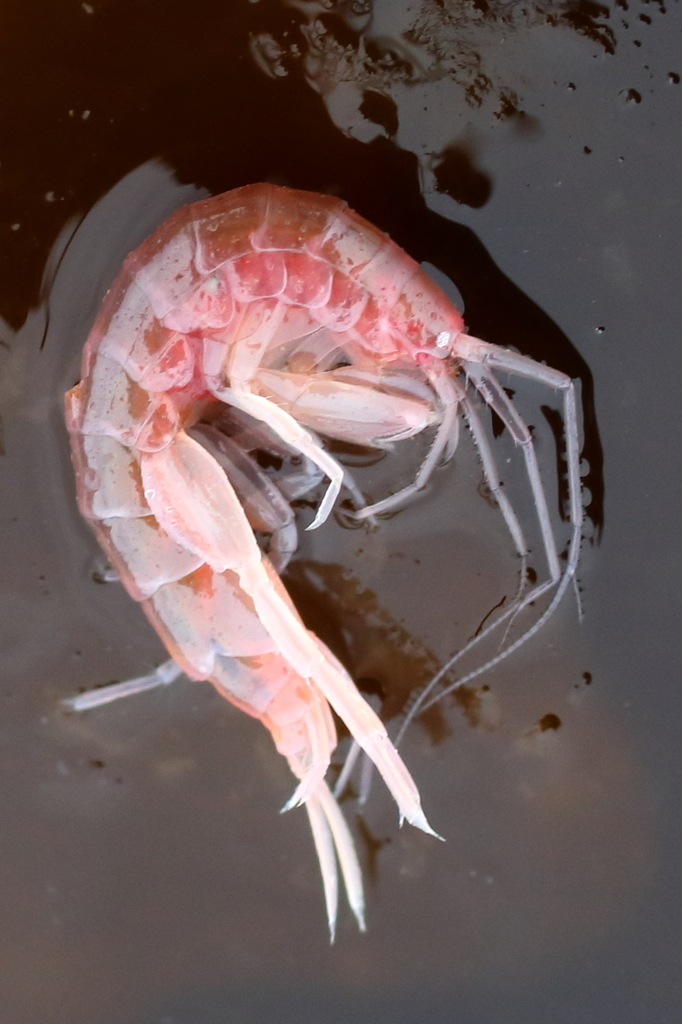
- Maera danae

Scientific classification
- Domain: Eukaryota
- Kingdom: Animalia
- Phylum: Arthropoda
- Class: Malacostraca
- Order: Amphipoda
- Family: Maeridae
- Genus: Maera; Leach, 1814

Synonyms
- Leptothoe Stimpson, 1853

= Maera (crustacean) =

Genus of amphipod crustaceans

Maera is a genus of amphipod crustacean in the family Maeridae, and was first described by William Elford Leach in 1814. The type taxon is Cancer (Gammarus) grossimanus Montagu, 1808, currently accepted as Maera grossimana (Montagu, 1808).

== Species ==
The genus contains the following species as of October 2023:

- Maera anoculata Rabindranath, 1983
- Maera bousfieldi Krapp-Schickel & Jarrett, 2000
- Maera danae (Stimpson, 1853)
- Maera denticoxa Ariyama, Kodama & Tomikawa, 2020
- Maera edwardsi Chevreux, 1920
- Maera fusca Spence Bate, 1864
- Maera grossimana (Montagu, 1808)
- Maera hirondellei Chevreux, 1900
- Maera irregularis Myers & Nithyanandan, 2016
- Maera jerrica Krapp-Schickel & Jarrett, 2000
- Maera loveni (Bruzelius, 1859)
- Maera lucinae Krapp-Schickel, 2004
- Maera nelsonae Krapp-Schickel & Jarrett, 2000
- Maera pachytelson Karaman & Ruffo, 1971
- Maera sagamiensis Ariyama, 2020
- Maera schieckei Karaman & Ruffo, 1971
- Maera similis Stout, 1913
- Maera sodalis Karaman & Ruffo, 1971
- Maera spinimana Ren, 2012
- Maera tenera Sars, 1885
- Maera umarae García-Madrigal, 2010
