= Bathyamaryllis =

Scientific classification
- Domain: Eukaryota
- Kingdom: Animalia
- Phylum: Arthropoda
- Class: Malacostraca
- Order: Amphipoda
- Family: Amaryllididae
- Genus: Bathyamaryllis; Pirlot, 1933

Type species
- Bathyamaryllis perezii Pirlot, 1933

Genus of crustaceans

Bathyamaryllis is a genus of amphipods belonging to the family Amaryllididae. The genus was first described in 1933 by Jean M. Pirlot, and the type species is Bathyamaryllis perezii Pirlot, 1933.

Species:

- Bathyamaryllis biscayensis Kaim-Malka, 2014
- Bathyamaryllis haswelli (Stebbing, 1888)
- Bathyamaryllis kapala Lowry & Stoddart, 2002
- Bathyamaryllis ouvea Lowry & Stoddart, 1994
- Bathyamaryllis perezii Pirlot, 1933
- Bathyamaryllis pulchellus (Bonnier, 1896)
