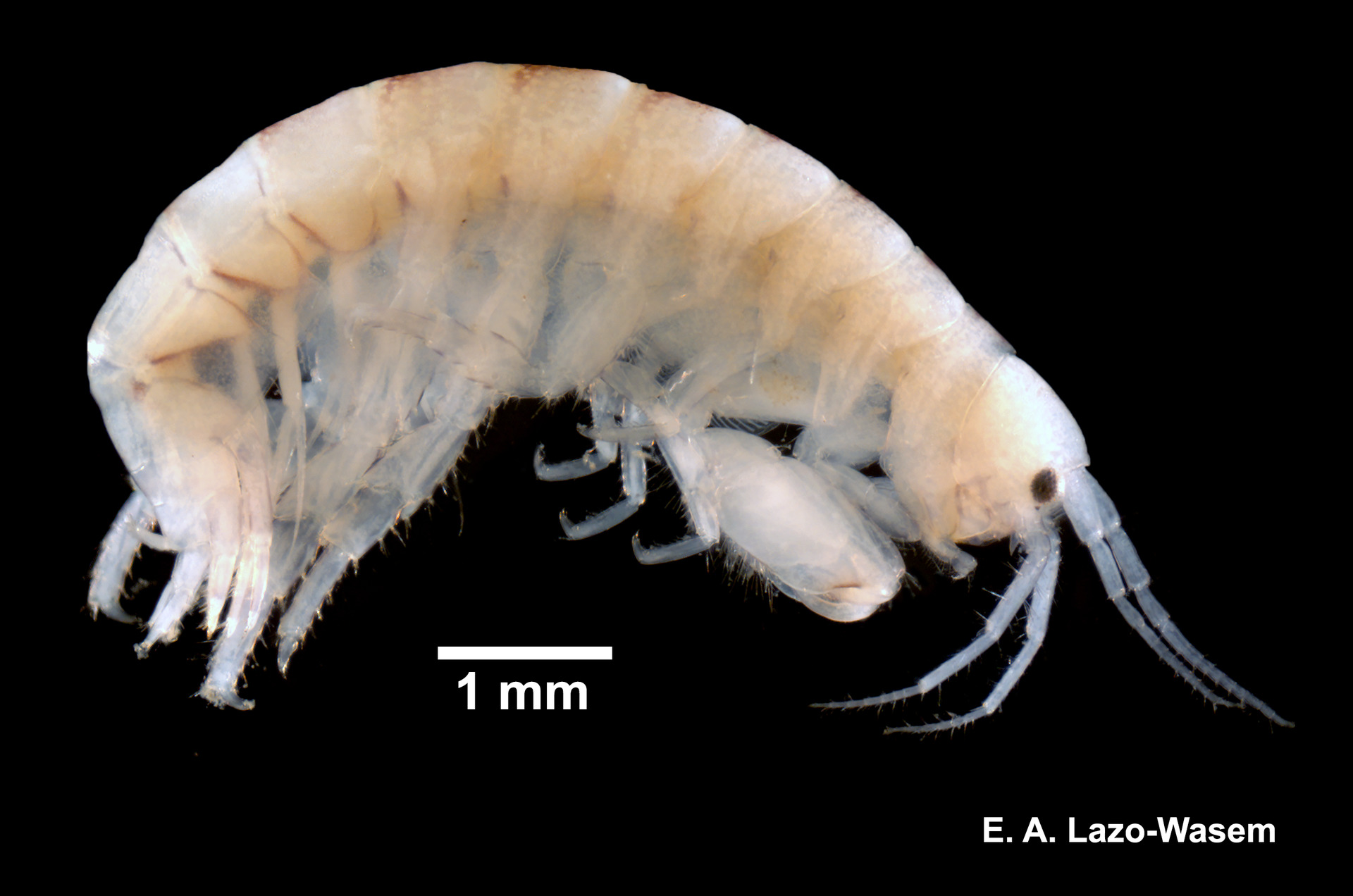
- Elasmopus levis

Scientific classification
- Domain: Eukaryota
- Kingdom: Animalia
- Phylum: Arthropoda
- Class: Malacostraca
- Order: Amphipoda
- Family: Maeridae
- Genus: Elasmopus; Costa, 1853

Type species
- Elasmopus rapax Costa, 1853

Synonyms
- Neogammaropsis Stout, 1913

= Elasmopus =

Genus of crustaceans

Elasmopus is a cosmopolitan genus of amphipods in the family, Maeridae, and was first described in 1853 by Achille Costa. The type species is Elasmopus rapax Costa, 1853.

== Species ==
There are 143 species accepted by WoRMS Some appear below.

- Elasmopus aduncus Myers, 1995
- Elasmopus alalo Myers, 1986
- Elasmopus alkhiranensis Myers & Momtazi, 2015
- Elasmopus antennatus (Stout, 1913)
- Elasmopus arafura Hughes & Lowry, 2011
- Elasmopus arrawarra Hughes & Lowry, 2006
- Elasmopus atolgidus J.L. Barnard, 1965
- Elasmopus atollicus Myers, 2014
- Elasmopus balkomanus Thomas & J.L. Barnard, 1988
- Elasmopus hawaiensis Schellenberg, 1938
- Elasmopus holgurus J.L. Barnard, 1962
- Elasmopus hooheno J.L. Barnard, 1970
- Elasmopus hyperopia Hughes & Lowry, 2011
- Elasmopus incarocai Alves, Johnsson & Senna, 2016
- Elasmopus incomptus Hughes, 2015
- Elasmopus integer Myers, 1989
- Elasmopus japonicus Stephensen, 1932
- Elasmopus karamani Souza-Filho & Senna, 2009
- Elasmopus karlae García-Madrigal, 2010
- Elasmopus koreanus Kim & Kim, 1991
- Elasmopus laminischia Myers, 2016
- Elasmopus lapu Myers, 1985
- Elasmopus laufolii Myers, 1986
- Elasmopus lecroyae García-Madrigal, 2010
- Elasmopus lejeunei Souza-Filho & Senna, 2009
- Elasmopus lemaitrei Ortiz & Lalana, 1994
- Elasmopus leveque Hughes & Lowry, 2011
