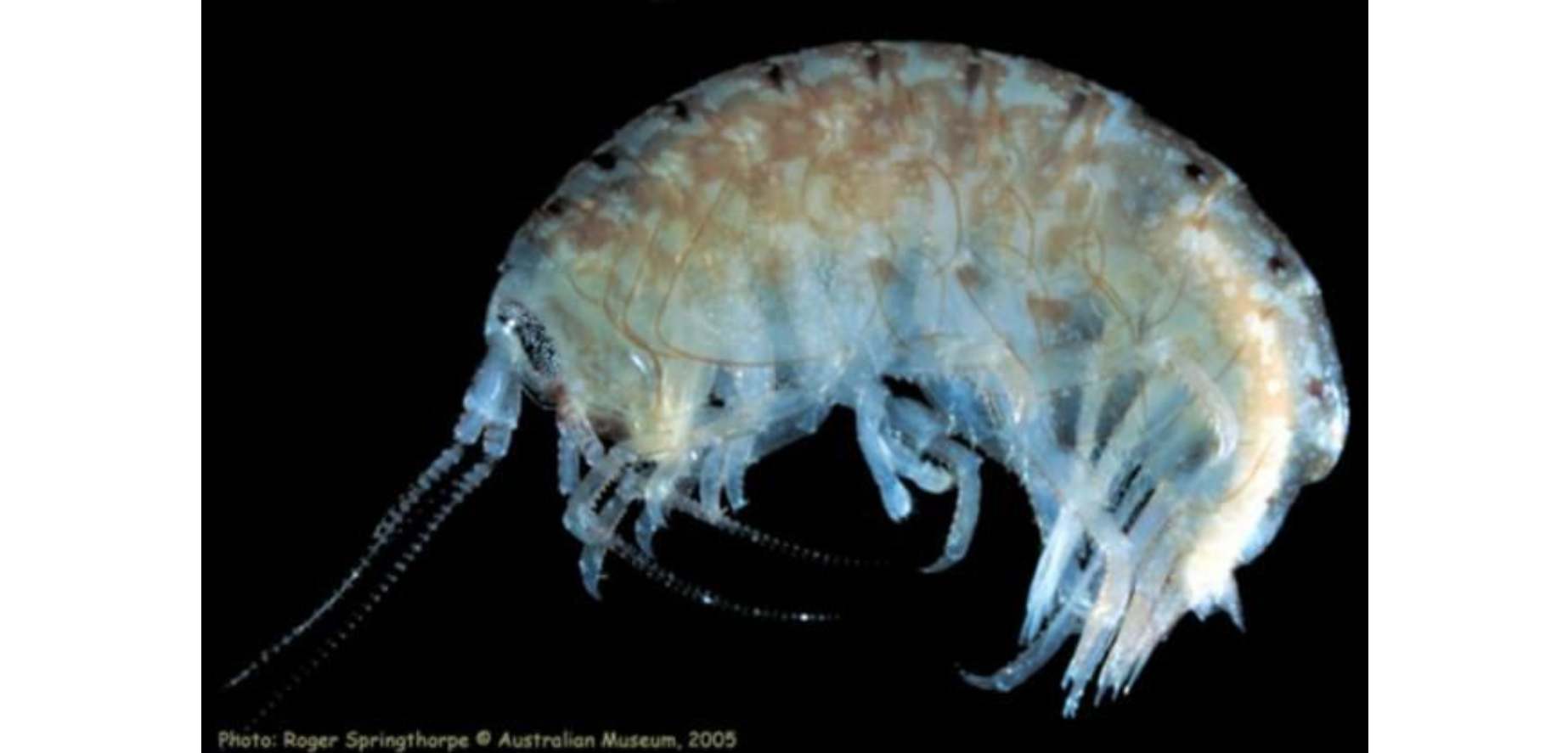
- Amaryllis carrascoi (AM P.73747)

Scientific classification
- Domain: Eukaryota
- Kingdom: Animalia
- Phylum: Arthropoda
- Class: Malacostraca
- Order: Amphipoda
- Family: Amaryllididae
- Genus: Amaryllis; Haswell, 1879

Type species
- Amaryllis macrophthalma Haswell, 1879

= Amaryllis (crustacean) =

Genus of crustaceans

Amaryllis is a genus of amphipods belonging to the family Amaryllididae. The genus was first described in 1879 by William Aitcheson Haswell, and the type species is Amaryllis macrophthalma Haswell, 1879 (by subsequent designation).

The species of this genus are found in Southern Hemisphere.

Species:

- Amaryllis atlantica Senna & Serejo, 2008
- Amaryllis brevicornis Haswell, 1879
- Amaryllis carrascoi Lowry & Stoddart, 2002
- Amaryllis croca Lowry & Stoddart, 2002
- Amaryllis dianae Lowry & Stoddart, 2002
- Amaryllis kamata Lowry & Stoddart, 2002
- Amaryllis keablei Lowry & Stoddart, 2002
- Amaryllis macrophthalma Haswell, 1879
- Amaryllis maculata G.Vinogradov, 2004
- Amaryllis migo Lowry & Stoddart, 2002
- Amaryllis moona Lowry & Stoddart, 2002
- Amaryllis olinda Lowry & Stoddart, 2002
- Amaryllis philatelica Lowry & Stoddart, 2002
- Amaryllis quokka Lowry & Stoddart, 2002
- Amaryllis spencerensis Lowry & Stoddart, 2002
