= Northeast Shelf Transition =

Marine bioregion in northeastern Australia

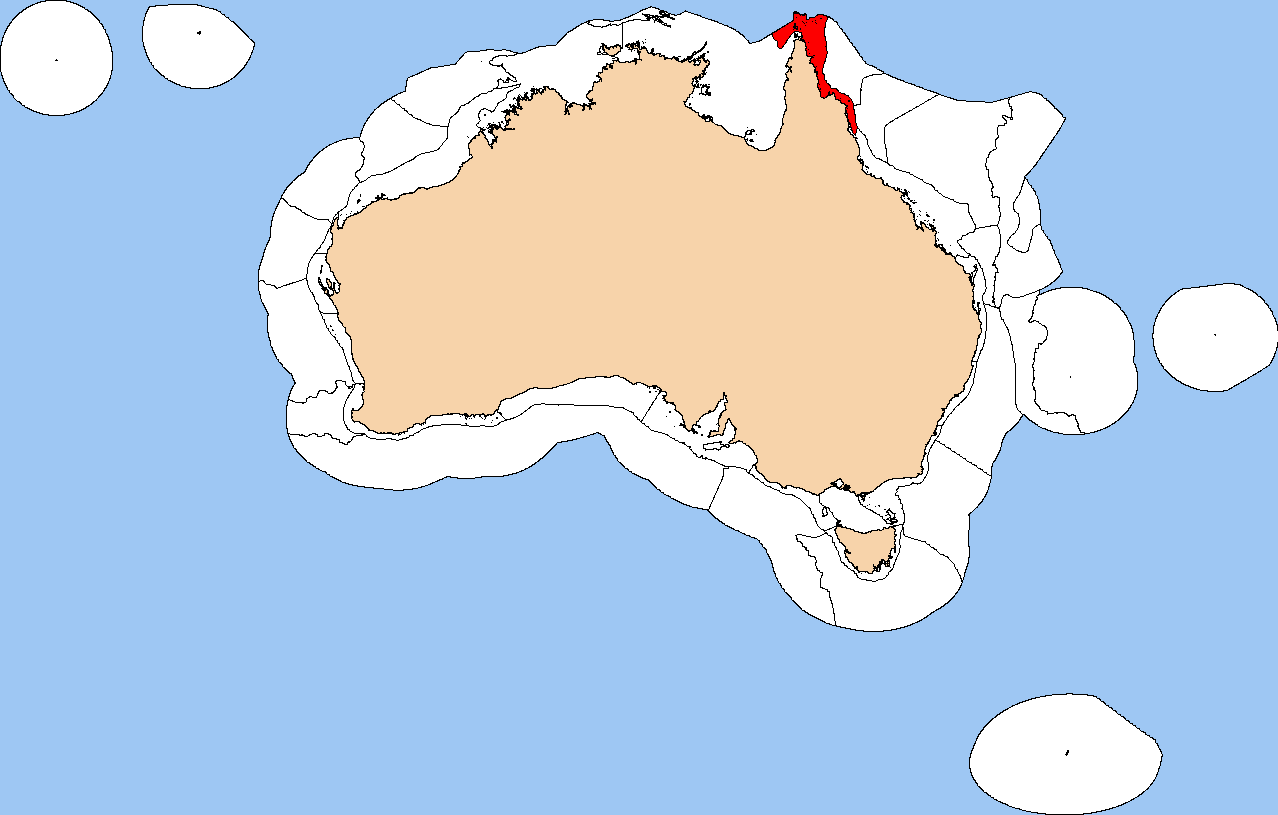
Map of the Northeast Shelf Transition

The Northeast Shelf Transition is a biogeographic region of Australia's coastal and continental shelf waters. It includes the tropical coastal waters of the northern Great Barrier Reef and the Torres Strait in northeastern-most Australia. It is a provincial level bioregion in the Integrated Marine and Coastal Regionalisation of Australia (IMCRA) system. It corresponds to the Torres Strait and Northern Great Barrier Reef marine ecoregion in the WWF's Marine Ecoregions of the World system.

== Geography ==
The Northeast Shelf Province extends along the eastern coast of Australia, from west of Cape York, the northern tip of Australia, southwards to Cooktown/Cairns. It extends from the shore to the edge of the continental shelf, and includes the Northern portion of the Great Barrier Reef and the waters around the Torres Strait Islands. On the west it adjoins the Northern Shelf Province, which includes the Gulf of Carpentaria and Australian portion of the Arafura Sea. On the south it adjoins the Northeast Shelf Province, which includes the central and southern portion of the Great Barrier Reef.

=== Meso-scale bioregions ===
The province contains three meso-scale bioregions:

- East Cape York (ECY)
- Torres Strait (TS)
- Ribbons (RBN)

== Ecology ==
The biota includes the a large group of Central Indo-Pacific species that reach their eastern limit on Australia's eastern coast, and a smaller group of northeastern Australian endemic species from the North Eastern Province.
