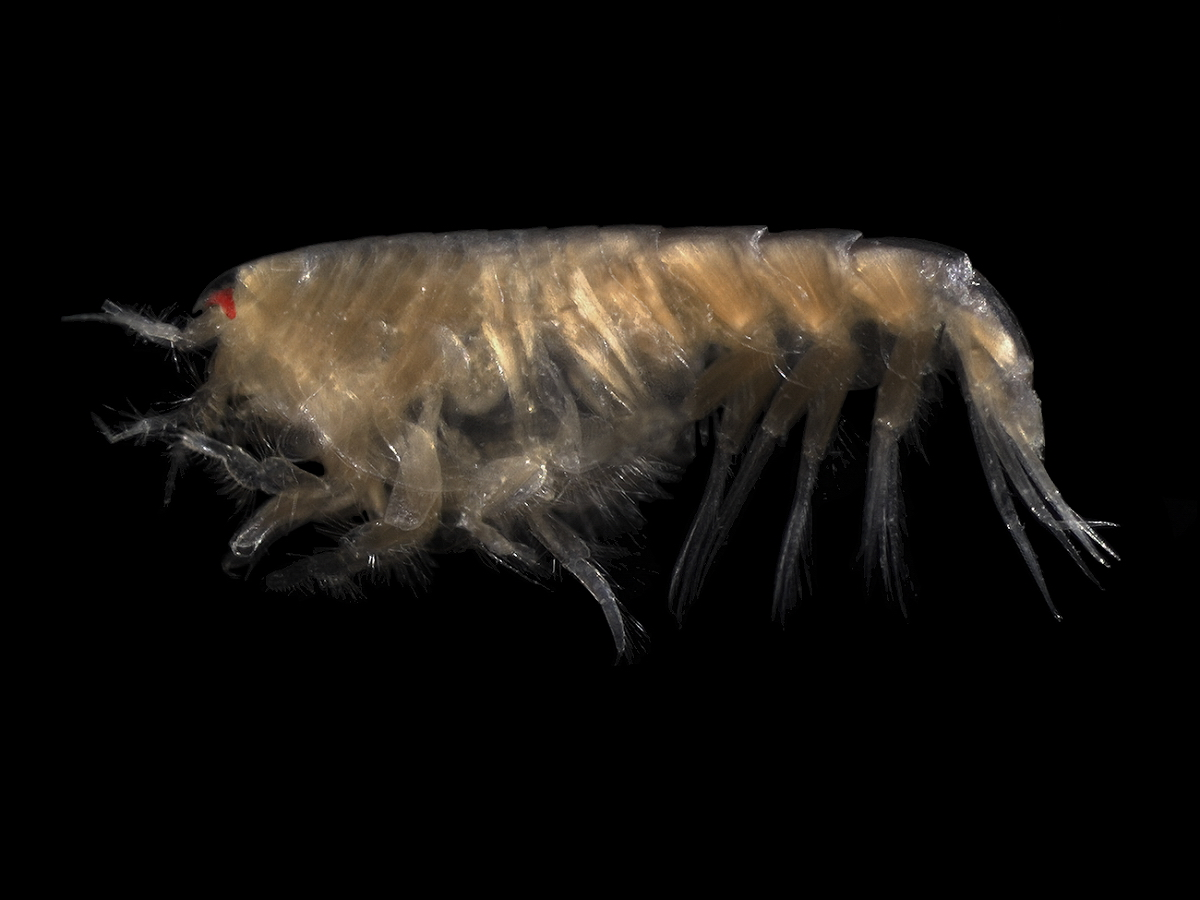
- Pontocrates altamarinus

Scientific classification
- Kingdom: Animalia
- Phylum: Arthropoda
- Clade: Pancrustacea
- Class: Malacostraca
- Order: Amphipoda
- Superfamily: Oedicerotoidea
- Family: Oedicerotidae; Lilljeborg, 1865

Genera
- See text

= Oedicerotidae =

Family of crustaceans

Oedicerotidae is a family of amphipods. It comprises the following genera:

- Aborolobatea Ledoyer, 1984
- Acanthostepheia Boeck, 1871
- Aceroides Sars, 1895
- Americhelidium Bousfield & Chevrier, 1996
- Ameroculodes Bousfield & Chevrier, 1996
- Anoediceros Pirlot, 1932
- Arrhinopsis Stappers, 1911
- Arrhis Stebbing, 1906
- Bathymedon Sars, 1892
- Carolobatea Stebbing, 1899
- Caviphaxus Ren, 1992
- Chitonomandibulum Jo, 1990
- Cornudilla Barnard & Karaman, 1991
- Deflexilodes Bousfield & Chevrier, 1996
- Eochelidium Bousfield & Chevrier, 1996
- Finoculodes J. L. Barnard, 1971
- Gulbarentsia Stebbing, 1894
- Halicreion Boeck, 1871
- Hartmanodes Bousfield & Chevrier, 1996
- Hongkongvena Hirayama, 1992
- Kroyera Bate, 1857
- Limnoculodes Bousfield & Chevrier, 1996
- Lopiceros J. L. Barnard, 1961
- Machaironyx Coyle, 1980
- Monoculodes Stimpson, 1853
- Monoculodopsis Ledoyer, 1973
- Monoculopsis Sars, 1895
- Oedicerina Stephensen, 1931
- Oediceroides Stebbing, 1888
- Oediceropsis Lilljeborg, 1865
- Oediceros Krøyer, 1842
- Pacifoculodes Bousfield & Chevrier, 1996
- Paramonoculopsis Alonso de Pina, 1997
- Paraperioculodes Barnard, 1931
- Parexoediceros Bousfield, 1983
- Paroediceroides Schellenberg, 1931
- Paroediceros Sars, 1895
- Perioculodes Sars, 1895
- Perioculopsis Schellenberg, 1925
- Pontocrates Boeck, 1871
- Pseudoculodes
- Rostroculodes Bousfield & Chevrier, 1996
- Sinoediceros Shen, 1995
- Synchelidium Sars, 1895
- Westwoodilla Bate, 1862
