= Northern Shelf Province =

Marine biogeographic region of northern Australia

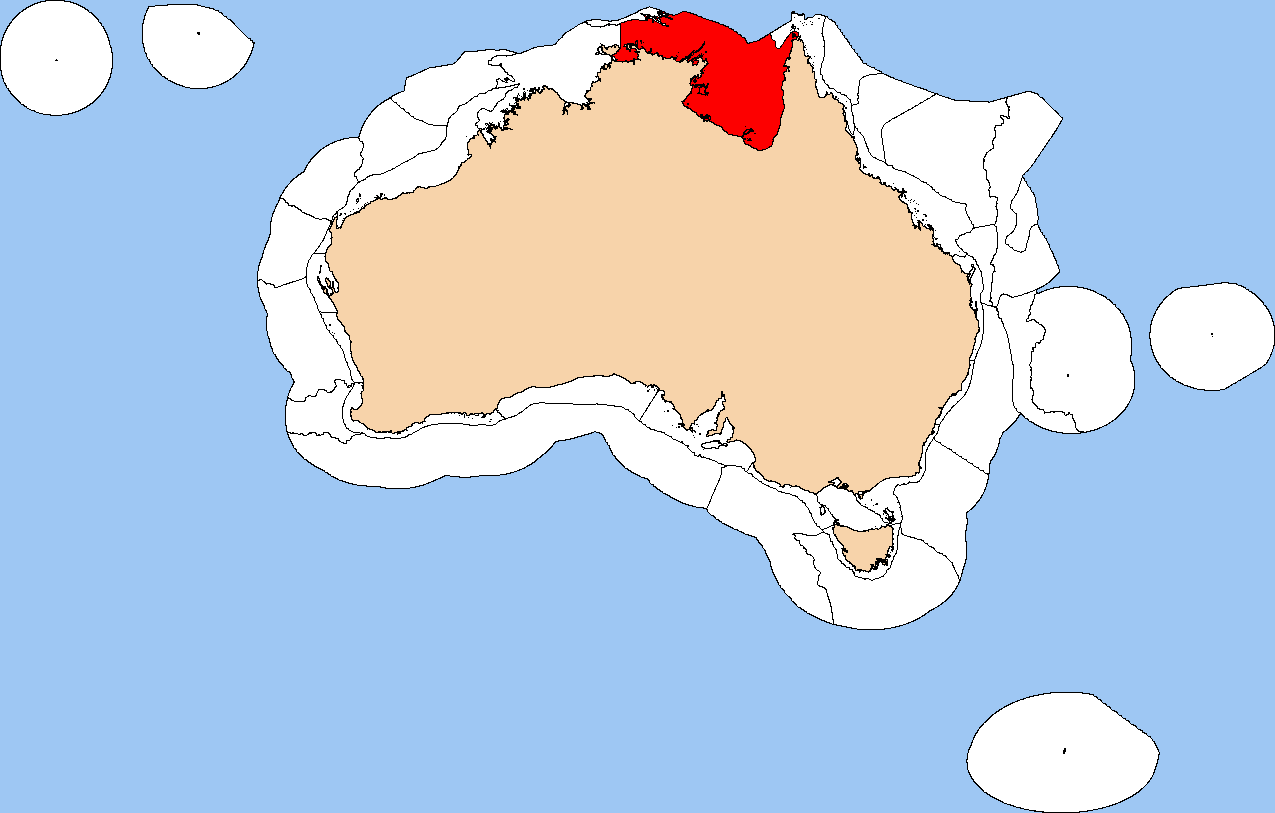
Map of the Northern Shelf Province

The Northern Shelf Province, also known as Arnhem Coast to Gulf of Carpentaria, is a biogeographic region of Australia's continental shelf. It includes the coastal waters of Arnhem Land and the Gulf of Carpentaria in Northern Australia.

== Geography ==
The Northwest Shelf Transition includes the coastal waters and continental shelf of Northern Australia, extending from the Northern Territory's Tiwi Islands eastwards along the coast of Arnhem Land and the Gulf of Carpentaria to Cape York.

The Northwest Shelf Transition lies to the west, and the Northeast Shelf Transition to the northeast. To the north the shallow continental shelf extends outside Australian waters to New Guinea.

== Meso-scale bioregions ==
The Integrated Marine and Coastal Regionalisation of Australia (IMCRA) identifies ten distinct meso-scale bioregions that make up the province.

- Van Diemens Gulf (VDG)
- Cobourg (COB)
- Arafura (ARA)
- Arnhem Wessel (AWS)
- Carpentaria (CAR)
- Groote (GRO)
- Pellew (PEL)
- Wellesley (WLY)
- Karumba-Nassau (KAN)
- West Cape York (WCY)
