= Northwest Shelf Province =

Bio-geographic region in MEOW scheme

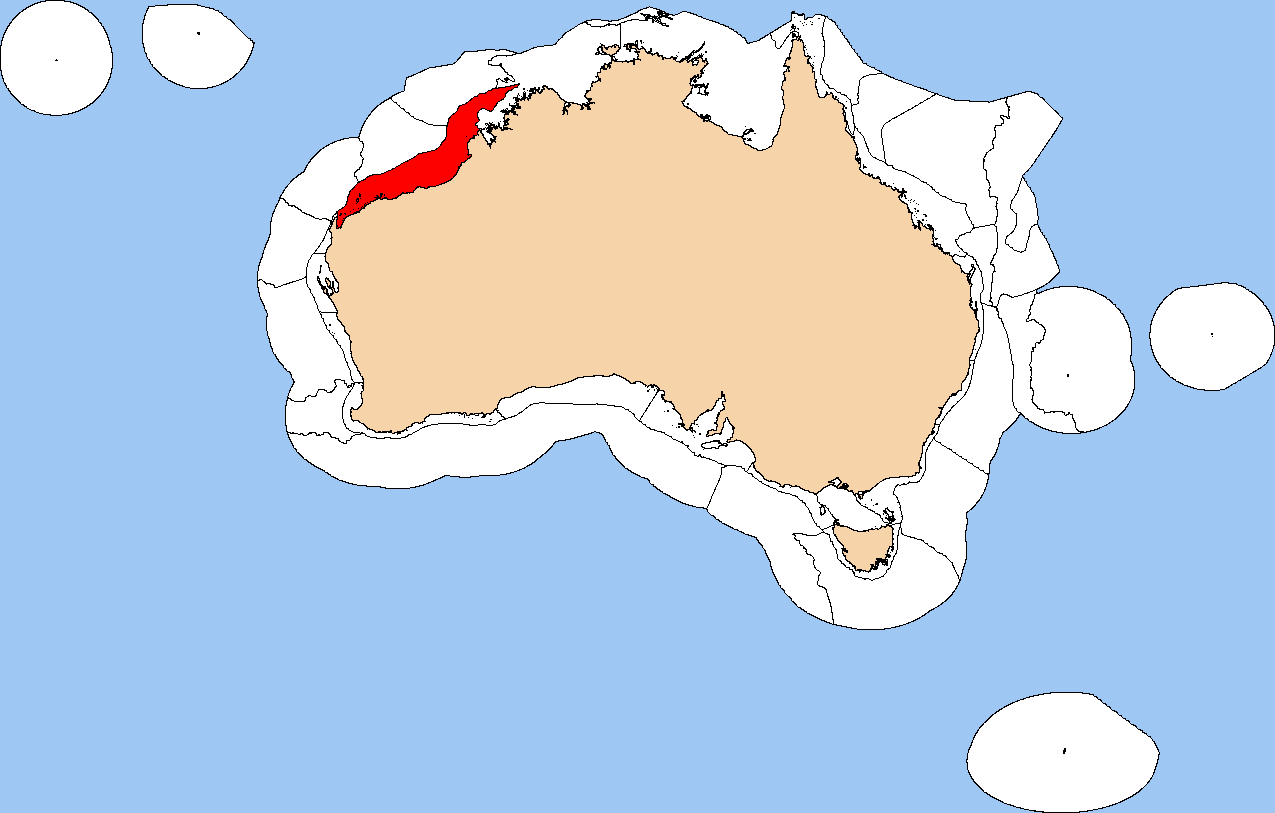
Map of the Northwest Shelf Province

The Northwest Shelf Province, also known as Exmouth to Broome, is a biogeographic region of Australia's continental shelf.

== Geography ==
The Northwest Shelf Province includes the coastal waters and continental shelf of north-western Western Australia between North West Cape and Cape Leveque. It has an area of 238,759 km^{2}, extending from the shore to 200 m depth. It varies in width from about 50 km at Exmouth Gulf to more than 250 km off Cape Leveque.

The Northwest Shelf Province adjoins the Central Western Shelf Transition or Ningaloo region on the southwest. The Northwest Shelf Transition lies east of Cape Leveque. To the north the continental slope descends towards the Indian Ocean's abyssal plain.

== Oceanography ==
The waters are tropical. Surface waters are derived from the Indonesian Throughflow, and circulate through the province via branches of the South Equatorial and Eastern Gyral currents. Tidal ranges are generally high.

The Northwest Coast, including the Pilbara Coast and Eighty Mile Beach, is the most cyclone-prone region of the entire Australian coastline. On average two cyclones cross the coast each year, one of which is severe.

== Meso-scale bioregions ==
The Integrated Marine and Coastal Regionalisation of Australia (IMCRA) identifies five distinct meso-scale bioregions that make up the province.

- Pilbara (nearshore) (PIN) includes the turbid coastal waters along the Pilbara Coast, including Exmouth Gulf, and nearshore islands between North West Cape and Cape Keraudren. Nearshore Pilbara includes extensive areas of mangrove.
- Pilbara (offshore) (PIO) includes the offshore waters of Pilbara, below 10 metres depth, along with several offshore islands. The clearer waters support coral reefs and sponge beds.
- Eighty Mile Beach (EMB) is a long sandy beach which extends from Cape Keraudren to Cape Missiessy. The beach is up to 100 metres wide with a very shallow gradient. Mud flats extend 1 to 5 km offshore from the beach. On the landward side are dunes, a few coastal lagoons, and dry Pindan woodland. Eighty Mile Beach is important habitat for migratory and resident shorebirds.
- Canning (CAN) includes the coast of Dampierland between Cape Missiessy and Cape Leveque, the northern tip of the Dampier Peninsula. The town of Broome is located on the Canning coast.
- North West Shelf (NWS) lies offshore, between the Pilbara (offshore), Eighty Mile Beach, and Canning bioregions and edge of the continental shelf. Much oil and natural gas extraction takes place there.
