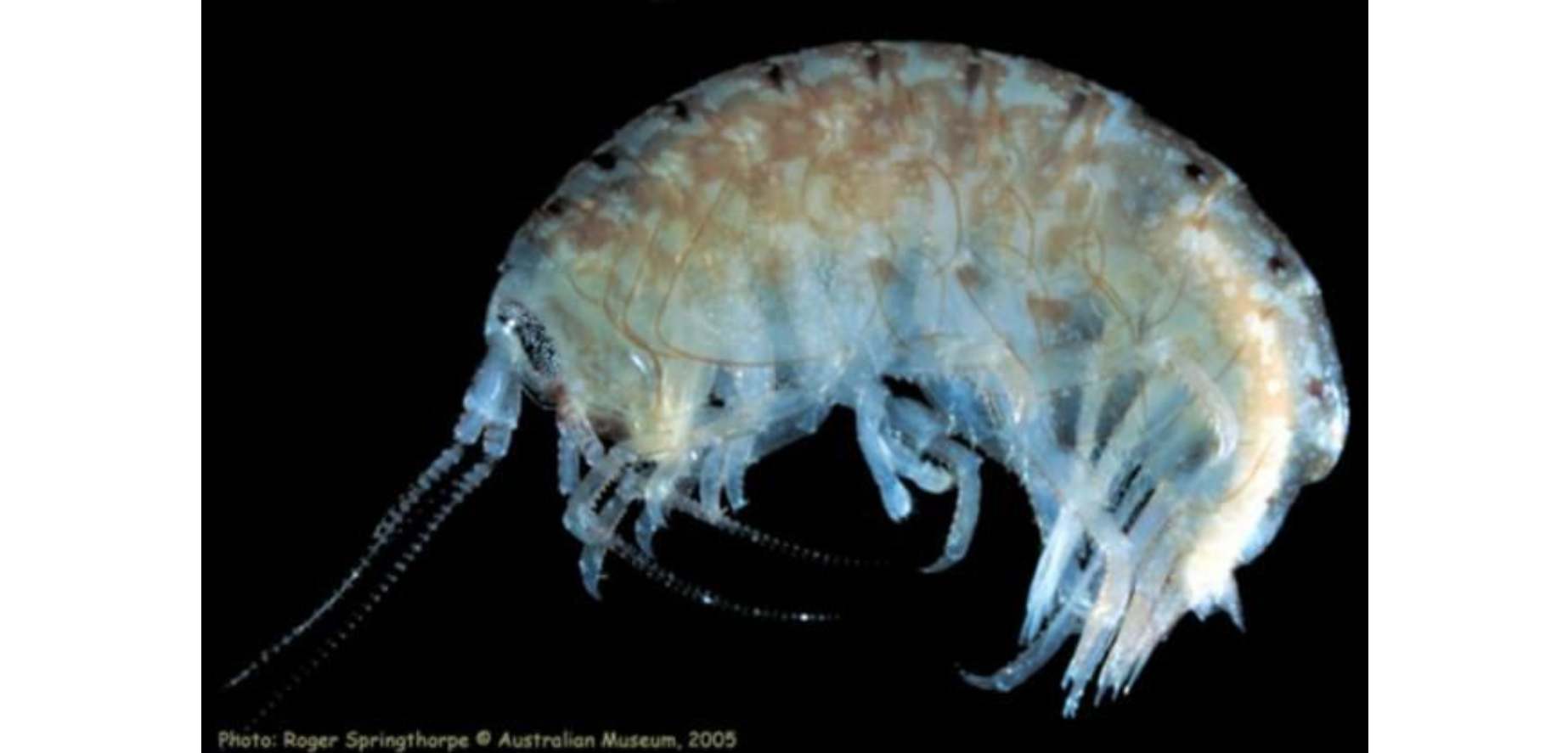
- Amaryllis carrascoi

Scientific classification
- Kingdom: Animalia
- Phylum: Arthropoda
- Class: Malacostraca
- Order: Amphipoda
- Suborder: Amphilochidea
- Infraorder: Lysianassida
- Parvorder: Lysianassidira
- Superfamily: Lysianassoidea
- Family: Amaryllididae; Lowry & Stoddart, 2002

Type genus
- Amaryllis Haswell, 1879

= Amaryllididae =

Family of crustaceans

Amaryllididae is a family of marine benthic amphipods found throughout the Southern Hemisphere. These smooth, laterally compressed amphipods can be distinguished by the accessory setal row of the mandible having a distal tuft. It was first described in 2002 by James K. Lowry and Helen E. Stoddart. It contains the following genera:

- Amaryllis Haswell, 1879
- Bamarooka Lowry & Stoddart, 2002
- Bathyamaryllis Pirlot, 1933
- Bertoliella
- Devo Lowry & Stoddart, 2002
- Erikus Lowry & Stoddart, 1987
- Pseudamaryllis Andres, 1981
- Vijaya Walker, 1904
- Wonga Lowry & Stoddart, 2002
