= Lauren E. Hughes =

Australian carcinologist

- Born: Lauren Elizabeth Hughes
- Education: University of New England
- Scientific career
- Workplaces: Australian Museum; Natural History Museum, London
- Thesis: Biodiversity of Amphipods in the Solitary Islands New South Wales, Australia (2007)
- Author abbrev. (zoology): Hughes

Lauren Elizabeth Hughes is an Australian carcinologist and curator. She specialises in the study of amphipods.

== Education and career ==
Hughes graduated from the University of New England, Armidale with a PhD in 2007. Her thesis was titled "Biodiversity of Amphipods in the Solitary Islands New South Wales, Australia".

As of 2022, Hughes is principal curator of invertebrates at the Natural History Museum, London. Prior to this, she worked at the Australian Museum in Sydney.

Hughes and zoologist James K. Lowry have described a number of amphipods in a number of joint papers.

Her zoological author abbreviation is Hughes.

== See also ==
- Taxa named by Lauren E. Hughes
