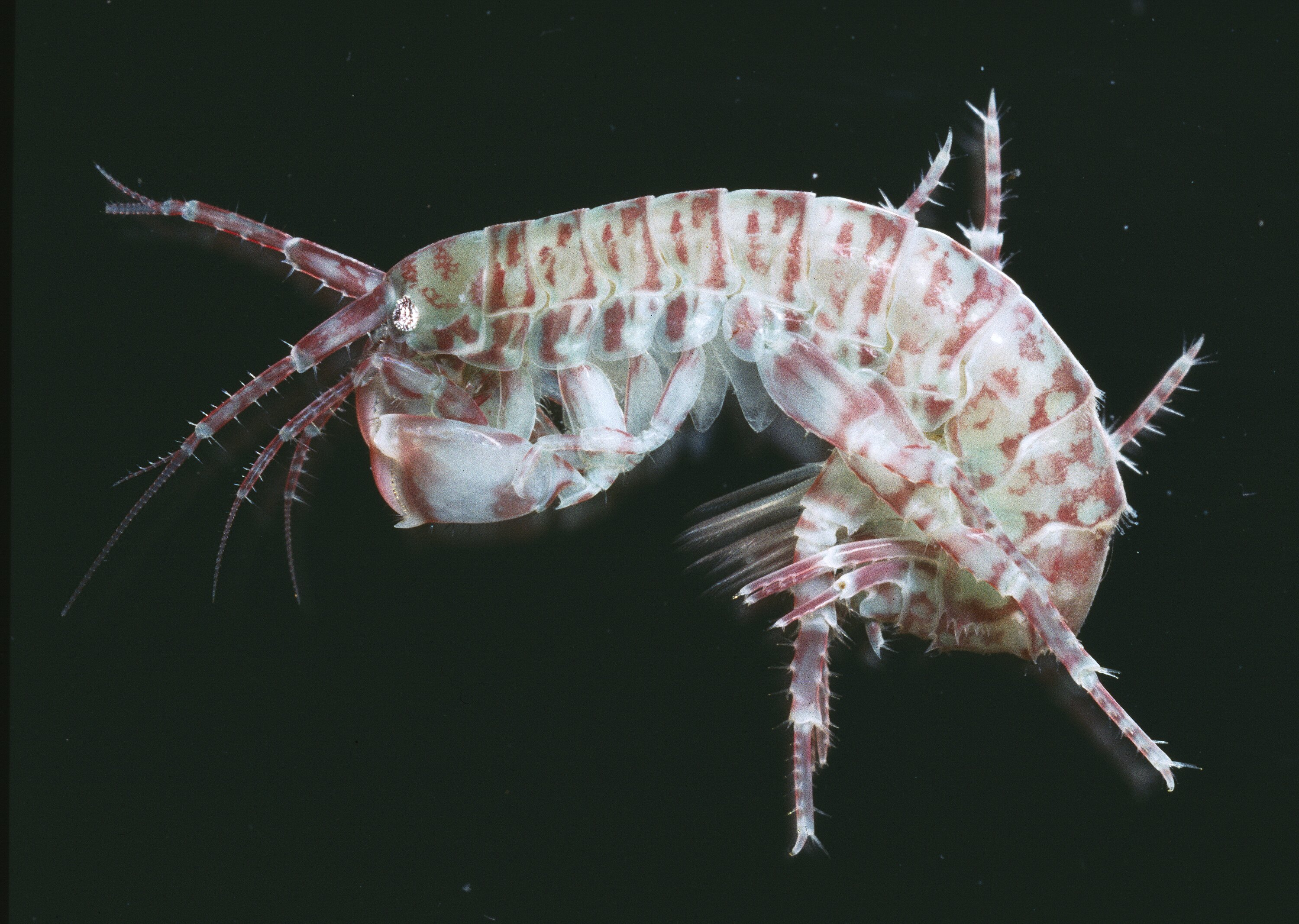
- Ceradocus sellickensis

Scientific classification
- Domain: Eukaryota
- Kingdom: Animalia
- Phylum: Arthropoda
- Class: Malacostraca
- Order: Amphipoda
- Suborder: Senticaudata
- Infraorder: Hadziida
- Parvorder: Hadziidira
- Superfamily: Hadzioidea
- Family: Maeridae; Krapp-Schickel, 2008

= Maeridae =

Family of amphipods

Maeridae is a family of marine amphipods, which was first described by Taudl Krapp-Schickel in 2008.

== Genera ==
Accepted genera:

- Anamaera Thomas & Barnard, 1985
- Anelasmopus Oliveira, 1953
- Animoceradocus G. Karaman, 1984
- Austromaera Lowry & Springthorpe, 2005
- Bathyceradocus Pirlot, 1934
- Beaudettia J.L. Barnard, 1965
- Ceradocoides Nicholls, 1938
- Ceradocopsis Schellenberg, 1926
- Ceradocus Costa, 1853
- Ceradomaera Ledoyer, 1973
- Clessidra Krapp-Schickel & Vader, 2009
- Coxomaerella G. Karaman, 1981
- Dumosus Thomas & Barnard, 1985
- Elasmopoides Stebbing, 1908
- Elasmopus Costa, 1853
- Glossomaera Krapp-Schickel, 2009
- Hamimaera Krapp-Schickel, 2008
- Hoho Lowry & Fenwick, 1983
- Ifalukia J.L. Barnard, 1972
- Jerbarnia Croker, 1971
- Linguimaera Pirlot, 1936
- Lupimaera Barnard & Karaman, 1982
- Maera Leach, 1814
- Maeracoota Myers, 1997
- Maerella Chevreux, 1911
- Maeropsis Chevreux, 1919
- Mallacoota Barnard, 1972
- Megaceradocus Mukai, 1979
- Metaceradocoides Birstein & M. Vinogradov, 1960
- Meximaera Ledoyer, 1983
- Miramaera Lowry & Springthorpe, 2005
- Othomaera Krapp-Schickel, 2000
- Paraceradocus Stebbing, 1899
- Parelasmopus Stebbing, 1888
- Pseudelasmopus Ledoyer, 1978
- Quadrimaera Krapp-Schickel & Ruffo, 2000
- Quadrivisio Stebbing, 1907
- Ruffomaera Krapp-Schickel, 2008
- Saurodocus Yerman & Krapp-Schickel, 2008
- Spathiopus Thomas & Barnard, 1985
- Thalassostygius Vonk, 1990
- Wimvadocus Krapp-Schickel & Jarrett, 2000
- Zygomaera Krapp-Schickel, 20
