= James K. Lowry =

New Zealand/Australian zoologist specialising in amphipods

James Kenneth Lowry (1942 - 2021) was a zoologist specialising in amphipods.

He was born in Kansas City, Missouri, and grew up near Chesapeake Bay. This led to a B.A in biology from the University of Richmond followed by an M.A in marine science from the College of William and Mary, where he worked on the benthic fauna of the Antarctic island, Anvers Island. His interest in Antarctic benthic fauna led to his Ph.D. from the University of Canterbury (New Zealand) in 1976 with the thesis, Studies on the macrobenthos of the Southern Ocean, researching which, he spent two winters at the New Zealand base on Ross Island near McMurdo Station, and during which time he survived five days on Antarctic sea ice, with three fellow students, after a late-evening sail went wrong.

He retired as a principal research scientist at the Australian Museum, where he worked from 1976 to 2011.

His zoological author abbreviation is Lowry.

== See also ==
- Taxa named by James K. Lowry.
