= Austropheonoides =

Scientific classification
- Domain: Eukaryota
- Kingdom: Animalia
- Phylum: Arthropoda
- Class: Malacostraca
- Order: Amphipoda
- Family: Cyproideidae
- Genus: Austropheonoides; J.L. Barnard, 1972

Type species
- Austropheonoides mundoe J.L. Barnard, 1972

Genus of crustaceans

Austropheonoides is a genus of amphipods in the Cyproideidae family, and was first described in 1972 by Jerry Laurens Barnard

Species of this genus are found in the Australian IMCRA regions of Southwest Shelf Province, the Great Australian Bight Shelf Transition, Spencer Gulf Shelf Province, and the Tasmanian Shelf Province, that is, off the coastlines of Western Australia, South Australia and Tasmania at depths of about 200 metres on the seabed.

== Species ==
From both GBIF and IRMNG:

- Austropheonoides mallee J.L.Barnard, 1974
- Austropheonoides mundoe J.L.Barnard, 1972
- Austropheonoides splendens Moore, 1981
- Austropheonoides takkure J.L.Barnard, 1974
- Austropheonoides truganini Moore, 1981
