= Cyproideidae =

Scientific classification
- Kingdom: Animalia
- Phylum: Arthropoda
- Clade: Pancrustacea
- Class: Malacostraca
- Order: Amphipoda
- Superfamily: Amphilochoidea
- Family: Cyproideidae; J. L. Barnard, 1974

Genera
- 18, see text

Family of crustaceans

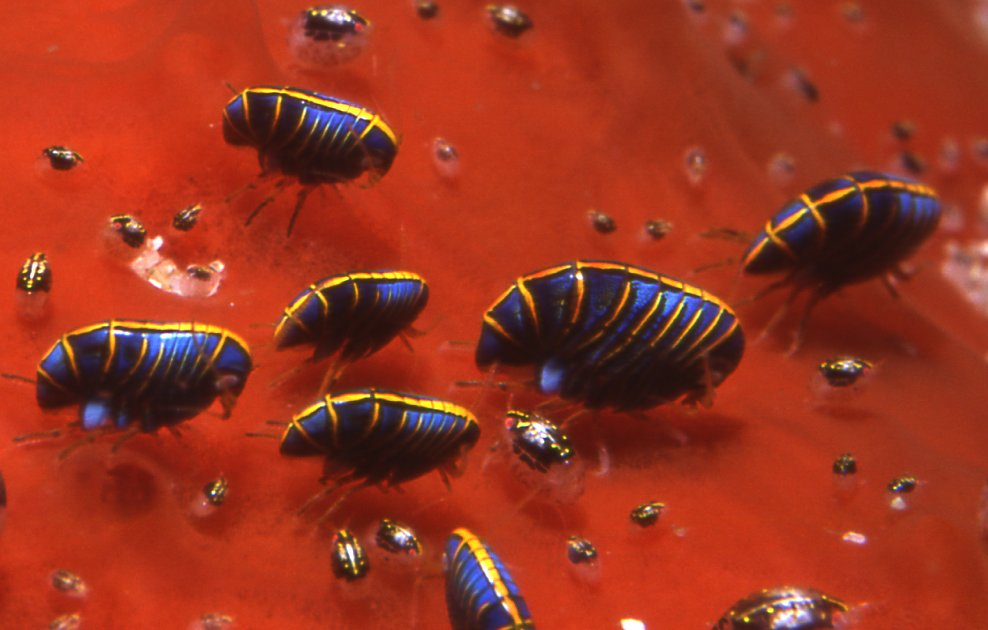

Cyproideidae is a family of amphipod crustaceans. Eighteen genera and 43 species have been described as of 2009. They occur mostly in the Southern Hemisphere, where they form associations with corals, sponges, crinoids and hydroids.

== Genera ==
The following 18 genera are included:

- Austropheonoides J. L. Barnard, 1972
- Cyproidea Haswell, 1879
- Gbroidea Lowry & Azman, 2008
- Hoplopheonoides Shoemaker, 1956
- Hoplopleon K. H. Barnard, 1932
- Mokuoloe J. L. Barnard, 1970
- Moolapheonoides J. L. Barnard, 1974
- Narapheonoides J. L. Barnard, 1972
- Neocyproidea Hurley, 1955
- Paracyproidea Stebbing, 1899
- Peltocoxa Catta, 1875
- Peltopes K. H. Barnard, 1930
- Pseudopeltocoxa Schiecke, 1977
- Stegoplax Sars, 1883
- Terepeltopes Hirayama, 1983
- Unguja Griffiths, 1976
- Unyapheonoides J. L. Barnard, 1972
- Victorhensenoides Rauschert, 1996
