= Maasara =

Village in Dakahlia Governorate, Egypt

- Location within Egypt
- Coordinates: 30°39′20″N 31°16′50″E
- Country: Egypt
- Governate: Dakahlia

Population (2006)
  - Total: 5,756
- Time zone: UTC+2 (EET)
  - Summer (DST): UTC+3 (EEST)

Maasara (Arabic: المعصرة) is a village that belongs to Mit Ghamr, Dakahlia Governorate, in Egypt.

According to the 2006 Egypt Census, the total population of Al Maasara and its sub-villages was about 5,756 persons of which 3,055 are males and 2,701 are females.

== See also ==
- Demographics of Egypt
- Central Agency for Public Mobilization and Statistics
