= Orthodox Christianity in Egypt =

The term Orthodox Christianity in Egypt may refer to:

- Eastern Orthodox Christianity in Egypt, representing communities and institutions of Eastern Orthodox Church, in Egypt
- Oriental Orthodox Christianity in Egypt, representing communities and institutions of Oriental Orthodox Church, in Egypt

== See also ==
- Orthodox Christianity (disambiguation)
- Egypt (disambiguation)
