= Egypt (disambiguation) =

Egypt is a country in Africa and Asia.

Egypt may also refer to:

== Places ==
=== Egypt ===
- the country of the lower Nile Valley
- historically:
  - Ancient Egypt (prehistory – 30 BC)
  - Egypt (Roman province) (30 BC – AD 639)
  - Arab Egypt (639–1250)
  - Mamluk Sultanate (1250–1517)
  - Ottoman Egypt (1517–1914), divided into two main periods:
    - Egypt Eyalet (1517–1867), a state under direct rule of the Ottoman Empire
    - Khedivate of Egypt (1867–1914), an autonomous tributary state of the Ottoman Empire
  - Sultanate of Egypt (1914–1922) under British colonial influence
  - Kingdom of Egypt (1922–1953)
  - Republic of Egypt (1953–58)

=== Australia ===
- Egypt, Queensland, a rural locality in Lockyer Valley Region

=== United Kingdom ===
- Egypt, Berkshire, a location in England
- Egypt, Buckinghamshire, a hamlet in England
- Egypt, Hampshire, a location in England
- Egypt, West Yorkshire, England
- Egypt, an area of Tollcross, Glasgow, Scotland

=== United States ===
- Egypt, Arkansas
- Egypt, Georgia
- Egypt, Mississippi (disambiguation)
- Egypt, Ohio
- Egypt, Belmont County, Ohio
- Egypt, Pennsylvania
- Egypt, Texas (disambiguation), any of several place names
- Egypt, West Virginia
- Little Egypt (region), a regional name indicating southern Illinois
- New Egypt, New Jersey

== Titles ==
=== Video games ===
- Egypt (1991 video game), a game for the Famicom
- Egypt 1156 B.C., a 1997 adventure video game
  - Egypt II: The Heliopolis Prophecy, a 2000 sequel
  - Egypt III, a 2004 sequel

=== Music ===
- Egypt (album), a 2004 album by Youssou N'Dour
- Egypt (Bethel Music and Cory Asbury song), a 2020 by Bethel Music and Cory Asbury
- "Egypt", a song by Kate Bush from her 1980 album Never for Ever
- "Egypt", a song by Mercyful Fate from their 1993 album In the Shadows
- "Egypt", a song by Symphony X from their 2000 album V: The New Mythology Suite

=== Other uses ===
- Egypt (TV series), a 2005 BBC TV docudrama on the history of Egyptology
- Egypt (comics), an American comic book miniseries started in 1995
- "Egypt", a poem by Patti Smith included in her 1978 book Babel

== Other ==
- Egypt Sherrod (born 1976), American radio personality
- Egypt (bird), a Scottish English term for the Spotted Flycatcher
- Mizraim, the Hebrew and Aramaic Name for Egypt, son of Ham in the Bible
- Egypt (electoral coalition), an electoral coalition formed for the 2015 Egyptian parliamentary election
- SS Egypt, a P&O liner which sunk in the English Channel in 1922

== See also ==
- Egyptian (disambiguation)
- Little Egypt (disambiguation)
