= Orthodoxy in Egypt =

The term Orthodoxy in Egypt may refer to:

- Eastern Orthodoxy in Egypt, representing adherents, communities and institutions of various Eastern Orthodox Churches, in Egypt
- Oriental Orthodoxy in Egypt, representing adherents, communities and institutions of various Oriental Orthodox Churches, in Egypt

== See also ==
- Orthodoxy (disambiguation)
- Orthodox Church (disambiguation)
- Egypt (disambiguation)
