= Egyptian =

Egyptian describes something of, from, or related to Egypt,

Egyptian or Egyptians may refer to:

== Nations and ethnic groups ==
- Egyptians, ethnic group native to Egypt
  - Egyptian culture, a complex and stable culture with thousands of years of recorded history
  - Egyptian cuisine, the local culinary traditions of Egypt
- Egypt, the modern country in northeastern Africa
  - Egyptian Arabic, the language spoken in contemporary Egypt
  - A citizen of Egypt; see Demographics of Egypt
- Ancient Egypt, a civilization from c. 3200 BC to 343 BC
  - Ancient Egyptian architecture, the architectural structure style
  - Ancient Egyptian cuisine, the cuisine of ancient Egypt
  - Egyptian language, the oldest known language of Egypt and a branch of the Afroasiatic language family
- Copts, the ethnic Egyptian Christian minority
  - Coptic language or Coptic Egyptian, the latest stage of the Egyptian language, spoken in Egypt until the 17th century, surviving in Coptic liturgy
- Romani people a.k.a. Gypsy, an ethnic group living mostly in Europe and the Americas
  - Egyptians (Balkans), an Albanian-speaking ethnic minority of Kosovo and Macedonia

== Culture and Religion ==
- Egyptian mythology
- Kemetism (ancient Egyptian religion)

== Art and entertainment ==
- Egyptian (band), an American indie rock band
- The Egyptians (band), an English band
- The Egyptian, a 1945 historical novel by Mika Waltari
- The Egyptian (film), a 1954 film by Michael Curtiz, based on Waltari's novel
- Piano Concerto No. 5 (Saint-Saëns) a.k.a. The Egyptian, a piano concerto by Camille Saint-Saëns

== Other uses ==
- Egyptian (typeface), a type of serif typeface characterized by thick, block-like serifs
- The Egyptian (prophet), a nameless 1st-century messianic revolt leader
- Little Egypt (region), something of, from, or related to the region of Southern Illinois
- Egyptian Lover (born 1963), American musician, vocalist, producer and DJ
- Egyptian Healy (1866–1899), pitcher for Major League Baseball in the 19th century
- Egyptian (ship), various ships with that name
- Egyptian Arabic Wikipedia, Wikipedia in Egyptian dialect of Arabic

== See also ==
- Egypt (disambiguation)
- Egyptienne (disambiguation)
