= Census in Egypt =

The practice of conducting a periodic census began in Egypt in the second millennium BC, where it was used for tax gathering and to determine fitness for military services.

== Pre-modern censuses ==
=== Pharaonic era ===
The earliest Egyptian census was the cattle count, which counted not people but livestock (especially but not exclusively cows) for taxation purposes. During the early Old Kingdom it was taken every two years; the frequency increased over time. Human censuses in Egypt first appeared in the late Middle Kingdom and develops in the New Kingdom. Herodotus wrote that Ahmose I, first monarch of the New Kingdom, required every Egyptian to declare annually to the nomarch, "whence he gained his living". Under the Ptolemies and the Romans several censuses were conducted in Egypt by government officials.

=== Roman era ===
Roman censuses in Egypt estimated the population at 4.5 million inhabitants in the year 14 AD and 5 million in 164 AD.

=== Islamic era (600 AD) ===
A census also took place in the era of Hesham Abdel Malek ben Marwan in the year 600 AD including the number of people, their ages and residences.

=== Napoleonic era (1798) ===
In 1798, Egypt's population was estimated at 3 million when Napoleon invaded the country.

=== 1848 and 1868 Censuses ===
After preliminary enumerations in some urban areas and villages the first countrywide census was carried out in 1848. A modern analysis of the 1848 census records, which attempts to adjust for various discrepancies in the data, concluded that Egypt's population was 4.476 million people back then. The 1848 census is said to be the first in a non-Western country to include demographic, social, and economic data on practically all individuals including females, children, and slaves. Digitization of the 1848 and 1868 census records is underway based on documents in the National Archives of Egypt.

== Modern censuses ==
=== Population censuses ===
During the last 135 years, Egypt has carried out around 14 official population censuses: the first was in 1882 and the most recent in 2017.

Official population censuses in Egypt since 1882
No.	Year	Population	Census	Carried out during	Image
1	1882	6,806,381	1882 Egyptian Census	Reign of the Khedive; Tewfik Pasha (1879-1892)	(1852–1892)
2	1897	9,734,405	1897 Egyptian Census	Reign of the Khedive; Abbas II Helmy (1892-1914)	(1874–1944)
3	1907	11,189,978	1907 Egyptian Census	Reign of the Khedive; Abbas II Helmy (1892-1914)	(1805–1852)
4	1917	12,716,255	1917 Egyptian Census	Reign of Sultan; Fuad I (1917-1936)	(1868–1836)
5	1927	14,177,864	1927 Egyptian Census	Reign of Sultan; Fuad I (1917-1936)	(1868–1836)
6	1937	15,921,000	1937 Egyptian Census	Reign of Sultan; Farouk I (1936-1952)	(1920–1965)
7	1947	18,967,000	1947 Egyptian Census	Reign of Sultan; Farouk I (1936-1952)	(1920–1965)
8	1960	26,085,000	1960 Egyptian Census	Government of President; Gamal Abdel Nasser (1954-1970)	(1918–1970)
9	1966	30,076,000	1966 Egyptian Census	Government of President; Gamal Abdel Nasser (1954-1970)	(1918–1970)
10	1976	36,626,000	1976 Egyptian Census	Government of President; Anwar El-Sadat (1970-1981)	(1918–1981)
11	1986	48,205,049	1986 Egyptian Census	Government of President; Hosni Mubarak (1981-2011)	(1928–2020)
12	1996	59,276,672	1996 Egyptian Census	Government of President; Hosni Mubarak (1981-2011)	(1928–2020)
13	2006	72,798,031	2006 Egyptian Census	Government of President; Hosni Mubarak (1981-2011)	(1928–2020)
14	2017	94,798,827	2017 Egyptian Census	Government of Marshal; Abdel Fattah el-Sisi (2014-Present)	(1954-)
-	2022	103,011,914	Estimates CAPMAS		

Census Year	Population (in thousands)	Population density (inhabitants/km^{2})
1882	6,712	6.65
1897	9,669	9.58
1907	11,190	11.09
1917	12,718	12.60
1927	14,178	14.05
1937	15,921	15.78
1947	18,967	18.79
1960	26,085	25.84
1966	30,076	29.79
1976	36,626	36.28
1986	48,254	47.80
1996	59,312	58.76
2006	72,798	70.70

=== 1882 ===
- 1882 — The first census in Egypt had been carried out. The total population was 6.7 million.

=== 1947 ===
- According to the 1947 census, Egypt's population had reached 19 million inhabitants.

Province or governorate	Population (1947 census)
Alexandria	928,237
Aswan	285,551
Asyut	1,379,875
Beheira	1,242,478
Beni Suef	613,365
Cairo	2,100,486
Dakahlia	1,366,085
Damietta	124,104
Faiyum	671,885
Frontiers	216,872
Gharbia	2,316,619
Girga (currently Sohag Governorate)	1,288,425
Giza	822,424
Ismailia	132,810
Minya	1,061,417
Monufia	1,168,777
Port Said	178,432
Qalyubia	687,169
Qena	1,106,296
Sharqia	1,290,890
Suez	108,250
Total population	19,090,447

=== Summary of results from 1976 to 2017 ===
- A census in 1976 revealed that the population had risen to 36.6 million.
- In 1986, a census indicated that the population of Egypt reached a total of 50.4 million, including about 2.3 million Egyptians working in other countries.
- In 1996, the census found a population of 59.3 million.
- In 2006, the thirteenth census in the Egyptian census series revealed that the Egypt's population hit 76.5 million inside and outside the country.
- A new census was done in 2017. Census day was 18 April 2017 and Egypt's population on that date was estimated to be 94,798,827.

== Summary of results of 2006 census ==
=== Nationwide demographics ===
Some statistics for the whole country
Statistic	Numerical result
Changes in population compared to the 1996 census
All age groups combined	22%
Under 6 years old	168%
Under 15 years old	256%
Over 45 years old	289%
Number of Households	17,265,567
Household Population	72,131,096
Family average	4 to 5
Number of university graduates	5,476,704
Number of Illiterates 2006	16,806,657
Raw Birth Rate	26
Raw Death Rate	6

=== Population by governorate ===
Governorate	1996	2006	Change %
Cairo	6,800,991	7,786,640	14.49
Giza	4,784,095	6,272,571	31.11
Sharqia	4,281,068	5,340,058	24.74
Dakahlia	4,223,338	4,985,187	18.04
Beheira	3,994,297	4,737,129	18.60
Gharbia	3,404,339	4,010,298	17.80
Alexandria	3,339,076	4,110,015	23.09
Minya	3,310,129	4,179,309	26.26
Qalyubia	3,281,135	4,237,003	29.13
Sohag	3,123,114	3,746,377	19.96
Asyut	2,802,334	3,441,597	22.81
Monufia	2,760,429	3,270,404	18.47
Qena	2,442,016	3,001,494	22.91
Kafr el-Sheikh	2,223,383	2,618,111	17.75
Faiyum	1,989,772	2,512,792	26.29
Beni Suef	1,859,213	2,290,527	23.20
Aswan	960,510	1,184,432	23.31
Damietta	913,555	1,092,316	19.57
Ismailia	714,828	942,832	31.90
Port Said	472,331	570,768	20.84
Suez	417,526	510,935	22.37
Luxor	361,138	451,318	24.97
North Sinai	252,160	339,752	34.74
Matruh	212,001	322,341	52.05
Red Sea	157,314	288,233	83.22
New Valley	141,774	187,256	32.08
South Sinai	54,806	149,335	172.48
Total Egypt	59,276,672	72,579,030	22.44

== Future projections ==
At current pace, Egypt's population is expected to reach 160 million by 2050. However, if the current rate of reproduction diminishes, the population may be limited to 120 million by 2050. Egypt already has one of the highest real population densities in the world.

== See also ==
- Central Agency for Public Mobilization and Statistics
- Demographics of Egypt
- Population history of Egypt
- Population and housing censuses by country
