= Egypt, Texas =

Egypt, Texas may refer to:

- Egypt, Leon County, Texas
- Egypt, Montgomery County, Texas
- Egypt, Wharton County, Texas
- Little Egypt, Texas, in Dallas County
