= Merimde Beni Salama =

Settlement in Ancient Egypt

Coordinates: 30.316°N 30.850°E

Merimde Beni Salama is a Neolithic settlement in Egypt, in the West delta of the Nile, 45 km northwest of Cairo. It is the typesite of Merimde culture. The settlement was occupied for about 800 years, from around 5000 to 4200 BC. The population may have reached as many as 16,000. The site represents the earliest evidence for a fully sedentary settlement in the Nile valley.

== History of research ==
The site was discovered by Hermann Junker during his West Delta Expedition. He excavated the site from 1923 to 1939. In 1976, excavations were continued by the Egyptian Antiquities Organisation.

In 1977-1982, excavations were conducted by the German Institute of Archaeology in Cairo under the direction of Josef Eiwanger.

== Description ==
=== Lithic assemblages ===
Merimde is located near the terraces at the Wadi el-Gamal. A wide variety of Paleolithic lithic assemblages have been discovered in the area. Finds around Merimde Beni Salama fall into four broad phases, the Lower Palaeolithic, the Middle Palaeolithic, the Epipalaeolithic and the Neolithic. All these correlate with many other dated lithic assemblages in the broader region, such as in Upper Egypt, Nubia, and Libya, as well as in the Nile Delta.

The Qarunian stone industry in the Faiyum, and the Helwanian industry (Helwan points) provide the closest similarities to those at Wadi Gamal terraces. Both of them are microlithic, consisting mostly of bladelets and blades.

=== Settlement ===
Early on, the settlement had been considered to be ca. 25 hectares, but recent research expanded this to at least 40 hectares, and possibly as much as 60 hectares.

The earliest radiocarbon date for Merimde Beni Salama is 5300 BC. Agriculture and animal breeding were a feature at the site right from the beginning.

According to Eiwanger, there were 3 functional phases of the settlement, with a total of 5 layers. After Phase I, there was a clear interruption in the settlement activity.

In Phase II, the settlement became more compact and substantial, with storage pits and hearths. Dwellings were in the form of rush and reed shelters. The role of cattle breeding also increased, but hunting still played an important role. Wheat, barley, sorghum and vetch were cultivated.

At this stage, the settlement was inhabited by communities with strong African influences. Sorghum is a crop that is native to Africa, where it was first domesticated.

During Phase III, the first human depictions known from Egypt were found, such as a figurine with visible hair, eyes and breasts.

Northeast of Merimde Beni Salama, in the western Delta, a Neolithic settlement at Sais had been identified in 1999. Numerous cultural parallels with Merimde are found here. Agriculture appears at Sais at about the same time as Merimde.

The adoption of a settled hunting and agricultural lifestyle in the Delta area may be connected to gradual changes in climatic conditions from 4600 BC onwards. It is believed that the Middle Holocene Moist phase started at that time.

== See also ==
- Population history of Egypt
- African humid period

== Literature ==
- Joanne Rowland, Geoffrey Tassie (2014), Prehistoric Sites along the Edge of the Western Nile Delta: Report on the Results of the Imbaba Prehistoric Survey 2013–14. The Journal of Egyptian Archaeology 100(1):49-65 doi:10.1177/030751331410000104 Project: The Prehistory of the Nile Delta
- Joanne M. Rowland (2021), New Perspectives and Methods Applied to the 'Known' Settlement of Merimde Beni Salama, Western Nile Delta. in Joanne M. Rowland, Giulio Lucarini, Geoffrey J. Tassie (eds.), Revolutions. The Neolithisation of the Mediterranean Basin: the Transition to Food Producing Economies in North Africa, Southern Europe and the Levant, Berlin Studies of the Ancient World.
- Eiwanger J. Merimde Beni-salame. In Bard, Kathryn A, ed., Encyclopedia of the Archaeology of Ancient Egypt. London/New York. 1999; 501–505
- Josef Eiwanger (1992). Merimde-Benisalame 3, Die Funde der jungeren Merimdekultur. Mainz
