= Egyptian (ship) =

Several vessels have been named Egyptian.

- Egyptian (1799 ship) was launched in 1788 in France. She was taken in prize circa 1799 and became a Liverpool-based slave ship. She made two complete voyages in the triangular trade in enslaved people. She was condemned at Jamaica after having delivered her slaves on her third voyage.
- Egyptian (1825 ship) was launched in 1825 at Shields. She began trading to India in 1827 under a licence from the British East India Company (EIC). In 1830 and 1831 she brought immigrants to the Swan River Colony. In 1839 and 1840 she transported convicts from England or Ireland to Tasmania. She was wrecked on 20 October 1843 while sailing from England to Sierra Leone.
- Egyptian (1826 ship) was launched in 1826 at Quebec. She made a voyage to Mauritius, sailing under a licence from the British East India Company (EIC). She was last listed in 1838.
