= Little Egypt =

Little Egypt may refer to:

- Little Egypt (archaeological site), Mississippian culture site located in Murray County, Georgia
- Little Egypt (dancer), stage name of three belly dancers
- A nickname for Southern Illinois
- A neighborhood in Astoria, Queens, New York City
- Little Egypt, Texas, in Dallas County
- A neighborhood in Cumberland, Maryland.
- Little Egypt, novel by Lesley Glaister
- Little Egypt (film), 1951 American film starring Rhonda Fleming
- "Little Egypt (Ying-Yang)", 1961 song written by Jerry Leiber and Mike Stoller
- Little Egypt, a wrestler in the Gorgeous Ladies of Wrestling series
