= Égyptienne =

Égyptienne or L'Égyptienne may refer to:

== Music ==
- L'Égyptienne, a 1728 harpsichord composition by Rameau
- L'Égyptienne (Lecocq), an 1890 operetta
- "L'Égyptienne" (song), a 1997 song by Belgian singer Natacha Atlas and French group Les Négresses Vertes

== Other ==
- Égyptienne (ship), the name of various ships during the French Revolutionary and Napoleonic Wars
- Egyptienne (typeface), a slab serif typeface designed in 1956 by Adrian Frutiger for Deberny & Peignot
- L'Égyptienne (magazine), a French language women's magazine published in Egypt from 1925 to 1940

== See also ==
- Egyptian (disambiguation)
