= Egypt, Mississippi =

Egypt, Mississippi may refer to:

- Egypt, Chickasaw County, Mississippi, an unincorporated community in Chickasaw County.
- Egypt, Holmes County, Mississippi, an unincorporated community in Holmes County.
