= Egypt, Montgomery County, Texas =

Unincorporated community in Texas, US

Coordinates: 30°13′16″N 95°33′42″W

Egypt is an unincorporated community in Montgomery County, Texas, United States. It lies at an elevation of 203 feet (62 m).

Egypt was settled by George Bell Madeley. He provided corn to the area farmers in a time of drought. The farmers named the area Egypt, after the Bible story in which Jacob's family went to Egypt to buy grain. (Genesis 41: 56-57).
