= Population history of Egypt =

Population growth in Egypt from 5000 BCE to 2023

Egypt has a long and involved demographic history. This is partly due to the territory's geographical location at the crossroads of several major cultural areas: North Africa, the Middle East, the Mediterranean, the Sahara and Sub-Saharan Africa. In addition, Egypt has experienced several invasions and being part of many regional empires during its long history, including by the Canaanites, the Ancient Libyans, the Assyrians, the Kushites (a Nubian civilization), the Persians, the Greeks, the Romans, and the Arabs.

However, invasions mostly involved the governing elite class and did not have a significant impact on the majority of the Egyptian population. Other scholars have suggested there may have been a gradual period of demographic change from Syria-Palestine, via the eastern Delta region.

== Neolithic and Predynastic periods ==
Around 8000 BCE, the Sahara had a wet phase, the Neolithic Subpluvial (Holocene Wet Phase). There is very little evidence of human occupation of the Egyptian Nile Valley during the Early and Middle Holocene periods. This may be due to problems in site preservation. The Middle Nile Valley (Nubia) had population settlements attested by occupational sequence since the Pleistocene and the Holocene. People from the surrounding areas moved into the Sahara, and evidence suggests that the populations of the Nile Valley reduced in size. Several scholars have argued that the origins of the Egyptian civilisation derived from pastoral communities which emerged in both the Egyptian and northern Sudanese regions of the Nile Valley in the 5th millennium BCE.

According to historian Donald Redford, the period from 9000 to 6000 BC had left very little in the way of archaeological evidence. Around 6000 BC, Neolithic settlements appear all over Egypt. Some studies based on morphological, genetic, and archaeological data have attributed these settlements to migrants from the Fertile Crescent in the Near East returning during the Egyptian and North African Neolithic, bringing agriculture to the region.

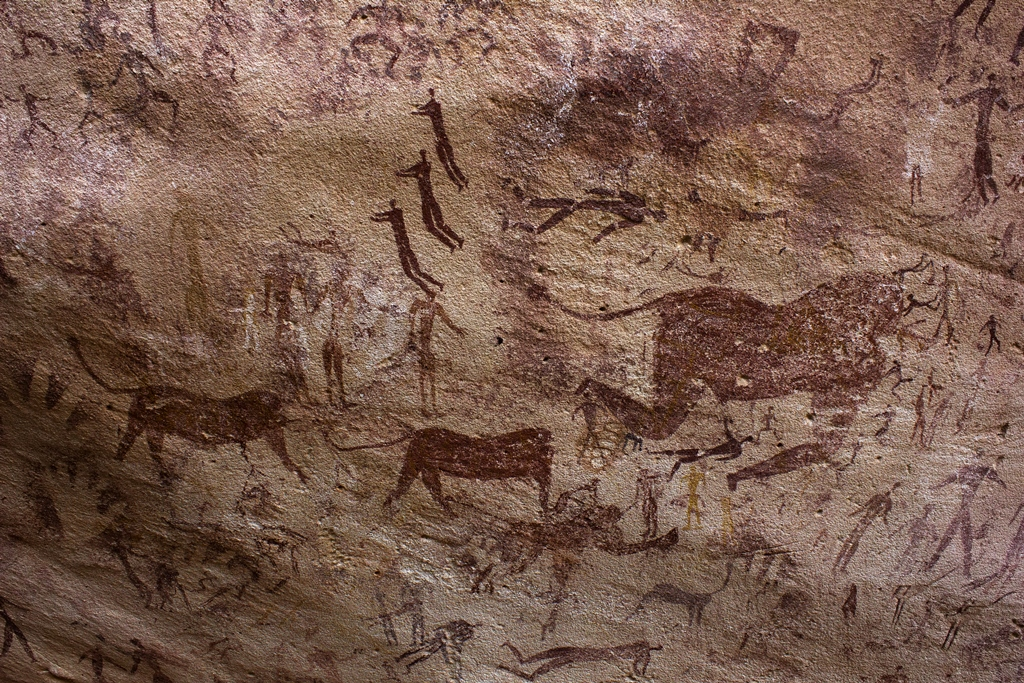
Neolithic rock art, over 7,000 years old, Cave of Beasts, Egypt

However, other scholars have disputed this view and cited linguistic, biological anthropological, archaeological and genetic data which does not support the hypothesis of a mass migration from the Levantine during the prehistoric period. According to historian William Stiebling and archaeologist Susan N. Helft, this view posits that the ancient Egyptians are the same original population group as Nubians and other Saharan populations, with some genetic input from Arabian, Levantine, North African, and Indo-European groups who have known to have settled in Egypt during its long history. On the other hand, Stiebling and Helft acknowledge that the genetic studies of North African populations generally suggest a big influx of Near Eastern populations during the Neolithic Period or earlier. They also added that there have only been a few studies on ancient Egyptian DNA to clarify these issues.

Historian Christopher Ehret, cited genetic evidence which had identified the Horn of Africa as a source of a genetic marker "M35/215" Y-chromosome lineage for a significant population component which moved north from that region into Egypt and the Levant. Ehret argued that this genetic distribution paralleled the spread of the Afrasian language family with the movement of people from the Horn of Africa into Egypt and added a new demic component to the existing population of Egypt 17,000 years ago. According to UNESCO scholar, Alain Anselin, accumulated research over three decades had confirmed the migration of peoples from the Sahara and southerly African regions into the early Nile Valley.

Predynastic Egypt is conventionally said to begin about 6000 BCE. Between 5300 and 3500 BCE. the wet phase declined and increasing aridity pushed the Saharan peoples into locations with reliable water, such as oases and the Nile Valley. The mid-Holocene droughts drove refuges from the Southern Levant and the Eastern Sahara into Egypt, where they mixed with indigenous Nilotes, desert herders, cultivators and hunters upon forming settlement communities.

From around 4800 to 4300 BCE, the Merimde culture, known from the typesite Merimde Beni-Salame, flourished in Lower Egypt. Later, Lower Egypt was also the home of the Buto Maadi culture, best known from the site at Maadi near Cairo. In Upper Egypt, the predynastic Badari culture was followed by the Naqada culture (Amratian). Recent archaeological data compiled has identified Tasian and Badarian Nile Valley sites as peripheral networks of earlier African cultures that featured the movement of Badarian, Saharan, Nubian, and Nilotic populations.

Around 3000 BCE, the wet phase of the Sahara came to an end. The Saharan populations retreated to the south towards the Sahel, and east in the direction of the Nile Valley. It was these populations, in addition to Neolithic farmers from the Near East, that likely played a role in the formation of the Egyptian state as they brought their food crops, sheep, goats, and cattle to the Nile Valley.

== Archaeological data and sources for population origin ==
Located in the extreme north-east corner of Africa, ancient Egyptian society was at a crossroads between the African and Near Eastern regions. Early Egyptologists noted the increased novelty and seemingly rapid change in Predynastic pottery and noted trade contacts between ancient Egypt and the Middle East. Fekri Hassan and Edwin et al. point to mutual influence from both inner Africa as well as the Levant.

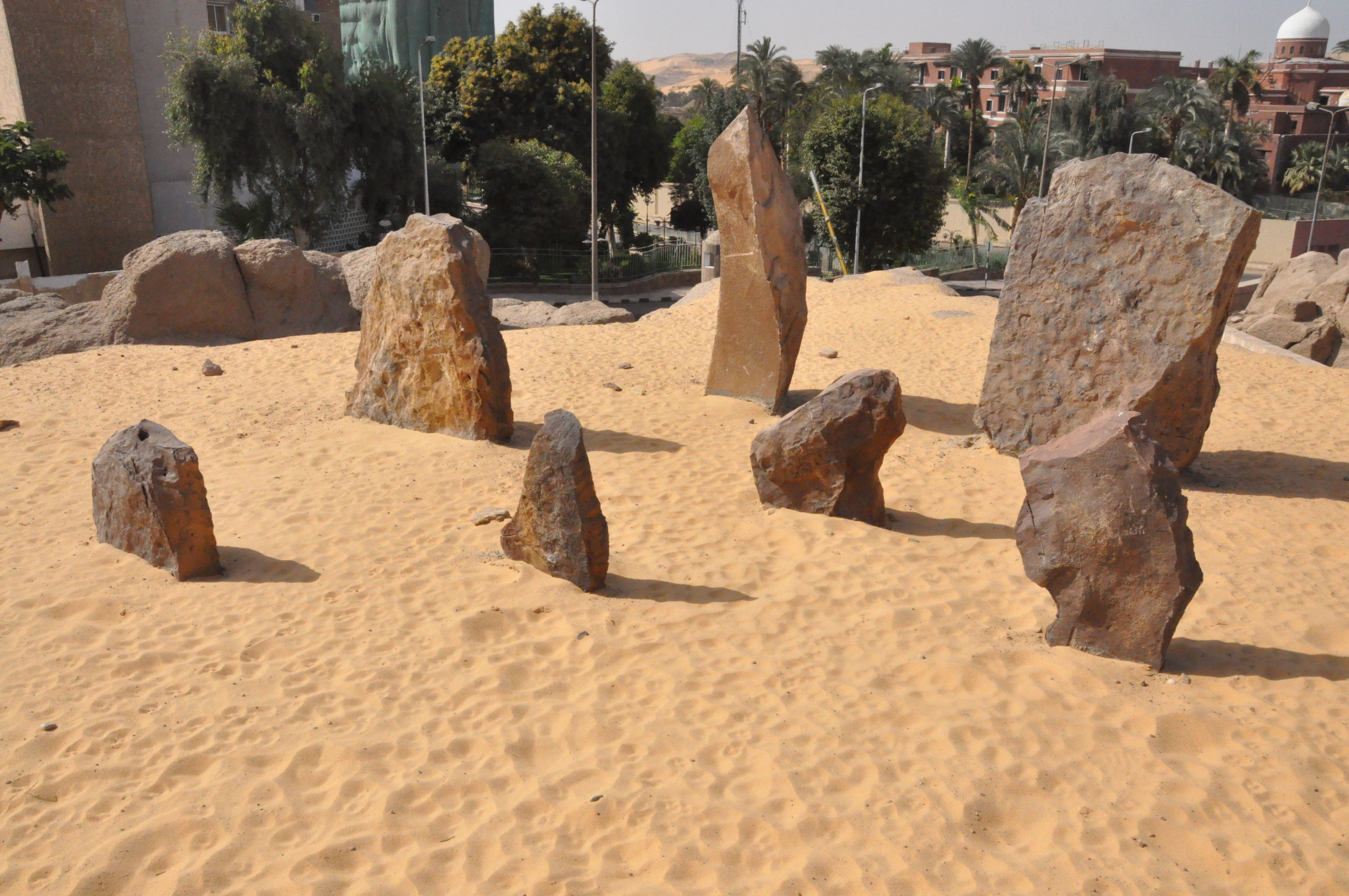
Megaliths from Nabta Playa, constructed by Neolithic populations, located in Aswan, Upper Egypt.

Excavations from Nabta Playa, located in Nubia about 100 km west of Abu Simbel, suggest that the Neolithic inhabitants of the region were migrants from Sub-Saharan Africa. There is some speculation that this culture is likely to have been the predecessor of the Egyptians, based on cultural similarities and social complexity which is thought to be reflective of the Old Kingdom of Egypt. In addition, there is evidence that sheep and goats were introduced into the Nabta Playa from Western Asia about 8,000 years ago.

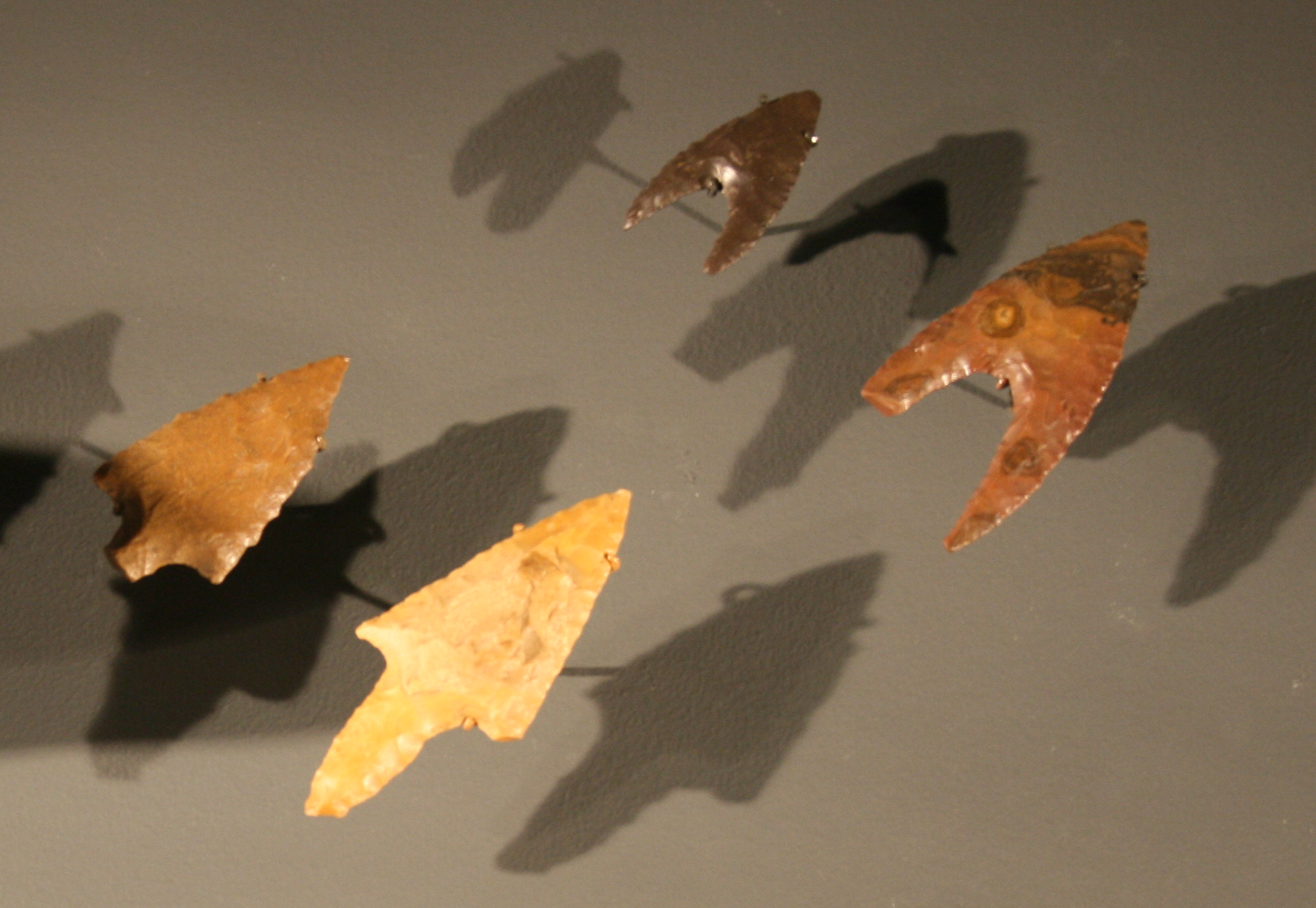
Arrowheads from Al Faiyum, Lower Egypt

The discoveries made at a cemetery at Qustul in Nubia lead Bruce Williams to suggest in 1980 the possibility that Egypt's monarchy originated near Qustul in Nubia. This theory has been directly contradicted by more recent discoveries at Abydos in Upper Egypt which prove that the Egyptian monarchy predates the tombs at Qustul. The archaeological cemeteries at Qustul are no longer available for excavations since the flooding of Lake Nasser. Focusing on the A-Group culture (3500–2800 BCE), Michinori asserted in 2000 that external influence from Nubia on the formation of Ancient Egypt in the pre-dynastic period to the dynasty period predates influence from eastern Mesopotamia. According to him, chiefs of the same cultural level as Upper Egyptian powers existed in Lower Nubia and exhibited pharaonic iconography before the unification of Egypt.

Christopher Ehret, S.O. Y. Keita, and Paul Newman have also argued that archaeological evidence does not support a spread of migrating Neolithic farmers from Asia into northern Africa, but rather a gradual incorporation of animal husbandry into indigenous foraging cultures.

Egyptian archaeologist, Fekri Hassan, (2002) indicated that the construction of monumental megalithic tombs and tumuli in the Saharan region of Niger and the Eastern Sahara which developed, as early as 4700 BCE, may have served as antecedents for the mastabas and pyramids of ancient Egypt. Hassan also identified the presence of several tumuli sites in predynastic Egypt regions such as Naqadah and Helwan.

British Egyptologist, Toby Wilkinson, has cited the iconography on rock art in the Eastern Desert region as depicting what he interpreted to be among the earliest representations of the royal crowns and suggested the Red Crown could have originated in the southern Nile Valley.

Maria Gatto also wrote in 2014 that archaeological research in the Aswan area has revealed that the process of cultural mixing in the boundary region of the First Cataract of the Nile River during the fourth millennium BCE, which is clearly detectable in the cultural material, was much more complex than previously thought. In the first half of the fourth millennium BCE the rise of the Naqada culture gave rise to a distinction between an Egyptian and a Nubian identity. Before then the Tarifian, Badarian and Tasian cultures of Middle and Upper Egypt were strongly similar to the Nubian/Nilotic pastoral tradition. The earliest evidence of the Naqada culture comes from the area of Abydos, and then it spread south into Nubia, and north across Egypt. The author also noted that the cultural substratum in Upper Egypt was mostly Nubian-related.

Stan Hendrick, John Coleman Darnell and Maria Gatto in 2012 excavated petroglyphic engravings from Nag el-Hamdulab to the north of Aswan, in southern Egypt, which featured representations of a boat procession, solar symbolism and the earliest known depiction of the White Crown with an estimated dating range between 3200 BCE and 3100 BCE.

Deitrich Wildung (2018) examined Eastern Saharan pottery styles and Sudanese stone sculptures and suggested these artefacts were transmitted across the Nile Valley and influenced the pre-dynastic Egyptian culture in the Neolithic period. Wildung, in a separate publication, has argued that Nubian features were common in Egyptian iconography since the pre-dynastic era and that the early dynastic pharaohs such as Khufu were represented with these Nubian features.

== Cultural anthropological practices and population influences ==
Egyptian scholar Gamal Mokhtar argued that the inventory of hieroglyphic symbols derived from "fauna and flora used in the signs [which] are essentially African" and in "regards to writing, we have seen that a purely Nilotic, hence African origin not only is not excluded, but probably reflects the reality" although he acknowledged the geographical location of Egypt made it a receptacle for many influences. Similar cultural features have been observed between the early Saharan populations and dynastic Egypt such as pottery, iconography and mummification.

Cultural practices during the pharaonic period have suggested that the Egyptian religious system had close, cultural affinities with Eastern African populations and arose from an African substratum rather than deriving from the Mesopotamian or Mediterranean regions. Some scholars have argued that Ancient Egyptians shared cultural connections and origins with the Land of Punt. This has been attributed to the Egyptian textual descriptions of Puntland as Ta Nejter which translates into "God's Land", along with comparable paintings which depicted Puntites in reddish-brown skin complexions similar to their Egyptian counterparts.

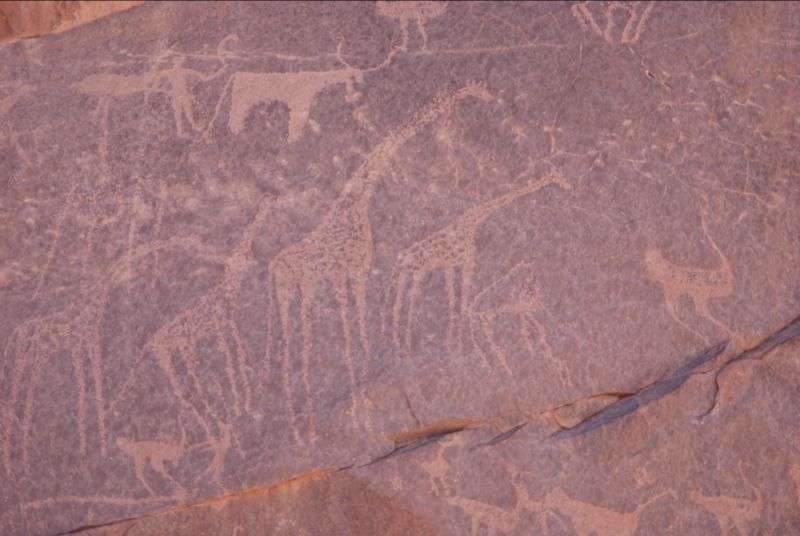
Ancient Petroglyphs of Giraffe, Ostrich, and longhorned Cow being driven by a human, featured in the desert region, Gilf Kebir, Egypt.

Archaeological evidence has suggested that the Ancient Egyptian counting system had origins in Sub-Saharan Africa. Also, fractal geometry designs which are widespread among Sub-Saharan African cultures are also found in Egyptian architecture and cosmological signs.The Ishango bone, according to scholar Alexander Marshack, may have influenced the later development of mathematics in Egypt as, like some entries on the Ishango bone, Egyptian arithmetic also made use of multiplication by 2; this however, is disputed.

The culture of Merimde in Lower Egypt, among others, has been linked to the Levant. The pottery of the Buto Maadi culture, best known from the site at Maadi near Cairo, also shows connections with the southern Levant. In Upper Egypt, the predynastic Badari culture was followed by the Naqada culture (Amratian). These groups have been described to be culturally related to the Nubian and Northeastern African populations. Upper Egypt is considered to have formed the pre-dominant basis for the cultural development of Pharaonic Egypt and the Proto-dynastic kings emerged from the Naqada region. Several dynasties of southern or Upper Egyptian origin, which included the 11th, 12th, 17th, 18th and 25th dynasties, reunified and reinvigorated pharaonic Egypt after periods of fragmentation.

Archaeologist Bruce Williams has advanced the view that Nubians participated with their first dynastic counterparts in the development of the pharaonic civilization. Williams also clarified in 1987 that his discovery of the Qutsul incense burner advanced no claim of a Nubian origin or genesis for the pharaonic monarchy but that excavations had shown Nubian linkages and contributions. He maintained that detailed, archaeological evidence had found cemeteries of tombs situated in Qustul, Nubia which were described to be vastly wealthier and greater in size than the Abydos tombs of the first dynastic rulers.

Christopher Ehret (1996) argued that the evidence of language and culture had shown Ancient Egypt was rooted in an African context and "the origins of Egyptian ethnicity lay in the areas south of Egypt".

Joseph Vogel (1997) stated "The period when sub-Saharan Africa was most influential in Egypt was a time when neither Egypt, as we understand it culturally, nor the Sahara, as we understand it geographically, existed. Populations and cultures now found south of the desert roamed far to the north. The culture of Upper Egypt, which became dynastic Egyptian civilization, could fairly be called a Sudanese transplant."

Frank Yurco in 1989 expressed the view that among foreign populations, Nubians were closest ethnically to the Egyptians, shared the same culture in the predynastic period, and used the same pharaonic political structure. Yurco wrote that: "The ancient Egyptians, like their modern descendants, were of varying complexions of color, from the light Mediterranean type (like Nefertiti), to the light brown of Middle Egypt, to the darker brown of Upper Egypt, to the darkest shade around Aswan and the First Cataract region, where even today the population shifts to Nubian." Yurco noted that some Middle Kingdom rulers, particularly some pharaohs of the Twelfth Dynasty, had strong Nubian features due to the origin of the dynasty in the Aswan region of southern Egypt. He also identifies the pharaoh Seqenenre Tao of the Seventeenth Dynasty, as having Nubian features. In 1996 he said that "the peoples of Egypt, the Sudan, and much of North-East Africa are generally regarded as a Nilotic continuity, with widely ranging physical features (complexions light to dark, various hair and craniofacial types)".

Stuart Tyson Smith (2001) described evidence which showed that the Ancient Egyptian culture shared strong affinities with modern African cultural practices such as divine kingship, the use of head rests along with circumcision and that the archaeological evidence also "strongly supports an African origin" for the ancient Egyptians. He also referenced physical and cultural similarities between the Egyptians and the Punities (considered to be coastal Sudan or Eritrea) that were represented with similar "red skin" symbolic hue and clothing attire. In 2018, Smith reviewed evidence which indicated linkages between the Upper Egyptian region, the Sahara and the Sudanese Nubia. In particular, he argued that the cultural features which characterised the Egyptian civilisation were "widely distributed in north-eastern Africa but not in western Asia" and this had earlier origins in the Saharan wet phase period.

Toby A. H. Wilkinson (2000) writes that in the elite art of the late Predynastic Period, the use of Mesopotamian iconography is well-known. He mentions in particular the intertwined serpopards and the rosettes on the Narmer Palette and the Narmer mace-head. After the reign of Narmer, indigenous Egyptian motifs were preferred. Toby Wilkinson in 2002 proposed an origin for the Egyptians somewhere in the Eastern Desert, and presented evidence that much of predynastic Egypt was representative of the traditional African cattle-culture, typical of Southern Sudanese and East African pastoralists of today.

Donald B. Redford wrote in 2004 that it is reasonable to assume that the Seventeenth Dynasty originated in Nubia based on the expanded presence of Nubians in Egypt during that time period. The Seventeenth Dynasty conducted a succession of military campaigns against Avaris in Lower Egypt and also Kerma in Nubia, resulting eventually in the collapse of Kerma and its occupation. In the eighth century BCE Kush considered itself the sole custodian and proponent of the unadulterated Egyptian tradition.

Augustin Holl (2025), Chair of the International Scientific Committee for the drafting the Volumes IX-XI of UNESCO General History of Africa, stated that Egypt and Nubia had an interwoven history and shared many cultural characteristics with the rest of Africa.

== DNA studies ==
Contamination from handling and intrusion from microbes create obstacles to the recovery of ancient DNA. Consequently, most DNA studies have been carried out on modern Egyptian populations with the intent of learning about the influences of historical migrations on the population of Egypt. DNA studies on Northeast Africans from Sudan and Horn of Africa showed affinities to modern North African and Middle Eastern populations and having a substantial "Eurasian" admixture. Historically, genetic studies on modern Egyptians have identified very old African lineages along with evidence for the later assimilation of Near Eastern and European groups through an examination of the Y chromosome and mitochondrial DNA chromosome.

A study published in 2017 described the extraction and analysis of DNA from 151 mummified ancient Egyptian individuals, whose remains were recovered from Abusir el-Meleq in Middle Egypt. The scientists said that obtaining well-preserved, uncontaminated DNA from mummies has been a problem for the field and that these samples provided "the first reliable data set obtained from ancient Egyptians using high-throughput DNA sequencing methods". The specimens represented a period stretching from the late New Kingdom to the Roman era (1388 BCE–426 CE). Complete mitochondrial DNA (mtDNA) sequences were obtained for 90 of the mummies and were compared with each other and with several other ancient and modern datasets. The scientists found that the ancient Egyptian individuals in their own dataset possessed highly similar mitochondrial profiles throughout the examined period. Modern Egyptians generally shared this maternal haplogroup pattern, but also carried more African clades. However, analysis of the mummies' mtDNA haplogroups found that they shared greater mitochondrial affinities with modern populations from the Near East and the Levant compared to modern Egyptians. However, the closest modern population to the ancient Egyptian mtDNA genome in terms of genetic distance is the modern Egyptian genome. Additionally, three of the ancient Egyptian individuals were analysed for Y-DNA, and were observed to bear paternal lineages that are common in both the Middle East and North Africa. The researchers cautioned that the affinities of the examined ancient Egyptian specimens may not be representative of those of all ancient Egyptians since they were from a single archaeological site. Wolfgang Haak, group leader at the Max Planck Institute for the Science of Human History in Jena noted that, "the genetics of the Abusir el-Meleq community did not undergo any major shifts during the 1,300 year timespan we studied, suggesting that the population remained genetically relatively unaffected by foreign conquest and rule."

Because the 2017 study only sampled from a single site at Abusir el-Meleq, Scheunemann et al.(2022) carried out a follow-up study by collecting samples from six different excavation sites along the entire length of the Nile Valley, spanning 4000 years of Egyptian history. 81 samples were collected from 17 mummies and 14 skeletal remains, and 18 high quality mitochondrial genomes were reconstructed from 10 individuals. The authors argued that the analyzed mitochondrial genomes supported the results from the earlier study at Abusir el-Meleq.

A 2020 DNA study by Gad, Hawass et al., analysed mitochondrial and Y-chromosomal haplogroups from Tutankhamun's family members of the 18th Dynasty, using comprehensive control procedures to ensure quality results. They found that the Y-chromosome haplogroup of the family was R1b, which originates in West Asia and which today makes up 50–60% of the genetic pool of modern Europeans. The mitochondrial haplogroup was K, which is most likely also part of a Near Eastern lineage. Because the profiles for Tutankhamun and Amenhotep III were incomplete, the analysis produced differing probability figures despite having concordant allele results. Because the relationships of these two mummies with the KV55 mummy had previously been confirmed in an earlier study, the haplogroup prediction of both mummies could be derived from the full profile of the KV55 data. However, the specific clade of R1b was not determined. Other findings showed the Y-chromosomal haplogroup for the Yuya mummy, and the mitochondrial haplogroup H2b, both also indicating West Asian and Near Eastern lineages for Tutankhamun's family members. The study referenced an older one showing the 20th Dynasty pair of Ramesses III and his son were found to have the haplogroup E1b1a based on 13 STRs using Whit Athey's Haplogroup Predictor, which has its highest frequencies in modern populations from West Africa and Central Africa, but which is rare among North Africans and nearly absent in East Africa.

In 2010 Hawass et al. undertook detailed anthropological, radiological, and genetic studies as part of the King Tutankhamun Family Project. The objectives included attempting to determine familial relationships among 11 royal mummies of the New Kingdom, as well to research for pathological features including potential inherited disorders and infectious diseases. In 2012, Hawass et al. undertook an anthropological, forensic, radiological, and genetic study of the 20th dynasty mummies of Ramesses III and an unknown man which were found together. In 2022, S.O.Y. Keita analysed 8 Short Tandem loci (STR) data published as part of these studies by Hawass et al., using an algorithm that only has three choices: Eurasians, sub-Saharan Africans, and East Asians. Using these three options, Keita concluded that the majority of the samples, which included the genetic remains of Tutankhamun and Rameses III had a population "affinity with 'sub-Saharan' Africans in one affinity analysis". However, Keita cautioned that this does not mean that the royal mummies "lacked other affiliations" which he argued had been obscured in typological thinking. Keita further added that different "data and algorithms might give different results" which reflects the complexity of biological heritage and the associated interpretation.

Genetic analysis of a modern Upper Egyptian population in Adaima by Eric Crubézy had identified genetic markers common across Africa, with 71% of the Adaima samples carrying E1b1 haplogroup and 3% carrying the L0f mitochondrial haplogroup. A secondary review, published in UNESCO General History of Africa Volume IX, in 2025 noted the results were preliminary and need to be confirmed by other laboratories with new sequencing methods. This was supported by an anthropological study which found the notable presence of dental markers, characteristic of Khoisan people, in a predynastic-era cemetery at Adaïma. The genetic marker E1b1 was identified in a number of genetic studies to have wide distribution across Egypt, with "P2/215/M35.1 (E1b1b), for short M35, likely also originated in eastern tropical Africa, and is predominantly distributed in an arc from the Horn of Africa up through Egypt". Multiple STR analysis of the Amarna royal mummies (including Rameses III, Tutankhamun and Amenhotep III) were deployed to estimate their ethnicity have found they had strong affinities with modern Sub-Saharan populations. Nonetheless, these forms of analysis were not exhaustive as only 8 of the 13 CODIS markers were used.

=== Ancient DNA and genomic evidence ===
The population history of ancient Egypt has long been reconstructed primarily through archaeological, textual, and linguistic evidence. Due to Egypt’s hot and arid climate, the preservation of ancient DNA (aDNA) is poor, and for many years genetic data from early Egyptian populations were extremely limited. As a result, models of population continuity and external influence were largely inferential.

A major breakthrough occurred in 2025 with the publication of the first whole-genome sequence from an individual dating to Egypt’s Old Kingdom. The individual, an adult male excavated at Nuwayrat in Middle Egypt and radiocarbon dated to between 2855 and 2570 BC, represents the earliest dynastic Egyptian genome analyzed to date.

Genomic analysis showed that the individual’s ancestry was predominantly related to North African Neolithic populations, indicating substantial population continuity in the Nile Valley from earlier Holocene groups. At the same time, approximately 20–24% of the genome displayed affinity with populations of the Eastern Fertile Crescent, including regions associated with Neolithic Mesopotamia. This finding provides direct evidence for gene flow between Egypt and the Near East prior to and during the early dynastic period.

The results suggest that population interactions between Egypt and neighboring regions were characterized by gradual human mobility and admixture rather than large-scale migration or population replacement. This pattern is consistent with archaeological evidence for long-distance exchange networks linking the Nile Valley with the Levant and Mesopotamia during the Neolithic and Early Bronze Age.

Comparisons with a genetic study published in 2017 from later periods indicate that Egypt’s population history continued to change over time, with additional Near Eastern and, in more recent historical periods, sub-Saharan African genetic contributions. The Old Kingdom genome thus provides a crucial baseline for understanding long-term demographic processes in Egypt and highlights the value of ancient DNA in refining models of population history.

The authors acknowledged limitations of the 2025 study, such as their reliance on a single Egyptian genome for analysis, and known limitations in predicting the above-referenced phenotypic traits in understudied populations. Analyses excluded any substantial ancestry in the Nuwayrat genome related to a previously published 4,500-year-old hunter-gatherer genome from the Mota cave in Ethiopia, or other individuals in central, eastern, or southern Africa.

Regarding the supplement facial reconstruction, the researchers noted that while the DNA analysis is indicative of population origin, there was no physical evidence of any particular skin colour, eye colour, or hair colour, and therefore, the reconstruction was produced in black and white without head hair or facial hair.

=== Multidisciplinary perspectives on population genetics ===
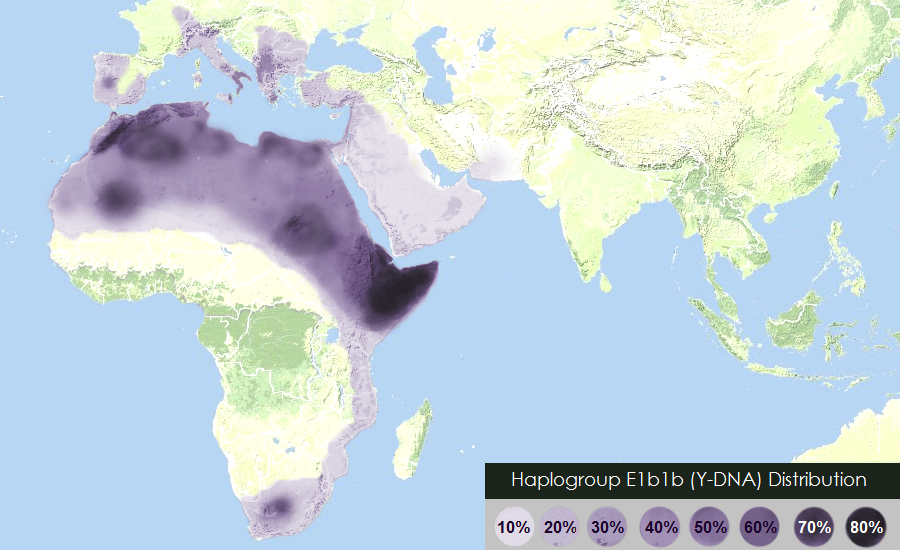
E1b1b is the most common paternal haplogroup across Africa, including Egypt, with modern genetic studies rooting the origin of the E haplogroup in East Africa.

Scholarship has appreciated the value of DNA studies in illustrating ancestral relationships and migration patterns but cautioned its over-reliance due to its emergence as a relative new field, the limited availability of sample sizes and the potential for bias in interpretation and methodology. Rather, it has been argued that continued emphasis should be on genetic studies to be interpreted in a compatible framework with other disciplines (archaeology, historical linguistics, physical anthropology) to examine the population origin of ancient Egyptians.

Anthropologist Alain Anselin found the distribution of linguistic, archaeological data to be consistent with initial genetic findings on Upper Egyptian population in Gurna which had a remnant of high M1 haplogroup and sub-Saharan affinities. This has been interpreted to suggest that the current population structure of Egypt may be the result of neighbouring influences on the ancestral population. Anselin also suggested that the combination of historical genetics and recent archaeological excavations in the Western Desert could contribute to the peopling of Egypt for which Saharan affinities had been identified in a previous, interdisciplinary review.

However, historian William Stiebling and archaeologist Susan N. Helft, stated conflicting DNA analysis on recent genetic samples such as the Amarna royal mummies has led to a lack of consensus on the genetic makeup of the ancient Egyptians and their geographic origins. They noted that the 2017 genetic study had performed the largest study on ancient Egyptians but noted that the findings still derived from a small sample of mummies from one site in Middle Egypt dating to the New Kingdom and later periods. Stiebling and Helft also stated that this study could not represent earlier populations or Egyptians from Upper Egypt who were geographically closer to Sub-Saharan populations.

Gourdine et al. criticised the methodology of the Scheunemann et al. study and argued that the Sub-Saharan "genetic affinities" may be attributed to "early settlers" and "the relevant Sub-Saharan genetic markers" do not correspond with the geography of known trade routes". However, modern population DNA studies linked this Sub-Saharan input to the trans-Saharan slave trade in Egypt and Morocco and dated it to 700 years ago in Egypt and 1200 years ago in Morocco. Historic evidence estimates that 6 million black slaves were transported across the Sahara between the years 650 AD and 1500 AD

In 2022, archaeologist Danielle Candelora noted several limitations with the 2017 Scheunemann et al. study such as its "untested sampling methods, small sample size and problematic comparative data" which she argued had been misused to legitimise racist conceptions of Ancient Egypt with "scientific evidence".

In 2025, the UNESCO International Scientific Committee Chair, Augustin Holl, for drafting the General History of Africa Volumes IX-XI had reaffirmed the view that Egypt had African and Eurasian populations. According to the review section, this has confirmed the migration of groups from the Sahara and regions south of Egypt to the valley, with a number of genetic, linguistic, archaeological and anthropological studies cited in the review section having demonstrated strong affinities between the Upper Egyptian population and Sub-Saharan groups. Nonetheless, UNESCO scholars Augustin Holl and Jean Gourdine both presented similar forms of criticisms, in the General History of Africa Volume IX, of the 2017 Scheunemann study in terms of its geographical coverage, general conclusions on the population of Egypt and methodological approach. Gourdine argued that there were a number of biases in the interpretation and the conclusions conflicted with other analysis such as the Amarna STR analysis, and evidence of identifiable African haplogroups such as E1b1b1, JK2955 (haplogroup L3) and JK2963 (haplogroup M1a1i), which preceded the trans-Saharan slave trade in Egypt.

Canadian historian Elise K Burton (2025) argued that recent aDNA research are deeply influenced by racial debates over the ethnicity of ancient Egyptians. She advanced the view that the perspectives of Western, West African and Egyptian scientific researchers have shaped the interpretation of genetic research and this has triggered conflict over access to the mummified remains of ancient Egyptians. She criticised early attempts of Cheikh Anta Diop to leverage paleoserology as reflecting racialist standards defined by European scholarship. Burton also expressed criticism for nationalist sentiments exhibited among Egyptian scholars such as Zahi Hawass and restricting foreign access to Egyptian royal mummies to maintain “genetic sovereignty”. She further highlighted that anti-black racism endured in Egyptian society and nationalist genetics presented its own variant of racialist genetics, as discussed in reference to the national genome project in Egypt. Lastly, Burton believed that Euro-American researchers benefited from the historical colonialism in facilitating a wide available source of Egyptian mummies in European museums. She also mentioned that recent studies such as the 2017 DNA study have been interpreted under racialised lens.

== Biological anthropometric indicators ==
=== Craniofacial criteria ===
The use of craniofacial criteria as reliable indicators of population grouping or ethnicity has been a longstanding focus of biological anthropology. In 1912, Franz Boas argued that cranial shape was heavily influenced by environmental factors and could change within a few generations under differing conditions, thereby making the cephalic index an unreliable indicator of inherited influences such as ethnicity. Gravlee, Bernard and Leonard (2003), Beals, Smith, and Dodd (1984) and Williams and Armelagos (2005) similarly posited that "race" and cranial variation had low correlations, and proposed that cranial variation was instead strongly correlated with climate variables. Joseph Deniker and other early anthropologists had also noted that the overall cranial form of Ethiopid, Near Eastern Semitic and Berber ethnic groups, all of whom speak Hamito-Semitic languages, are largely the same.

Brace (1993) differentiated adaptive cranial traits from non-adaptive cranial traits, asserting that only the non-adaptive cranial traits served as reliable indicators of genetic relatedness between populations. This was further corroborated in studies by von Cramon-Taubadel (2008, 2009a, 2011). Clement and Ranson (1998) claimed that cranial analysis yields a 77%-95% rate of accuracy in determining the racial origins of human skeletal remains. However, the traits are not clear until puberty, racial determination of preadolescent skulls is much more difficult.

A craniofacial study by C. Loring Brace et al. (1993) concluded that the Predynastic Egyptians of Upper Egypt and the Late Dynastic Egyptians of Lower Egypt were most closely related to each other. They also showed general ties with other Afro-Asiatic-speaking populations in North Africa and Horn of Africa, Neolithic and modern Europeans, and Indian people, but not at all with populations of sub-Saharan Africa, Eastern Asia, Oceania, or the Americas.

In 1993 a craniofacial study was performed by the anthropologist C. Loring Brace, the report reached the view that "The Predynastic of Upper Egypt and the Late Dynastic of Lower Egypt are more closely related to each other than to any other population", and most similar to modern Egyptians among modern populations, stating "the Egyptians have been in place since back in the Pleistocene and have been largely unaffected by either invasions or migrations." The craniometric analysis of predynastic Naqada human remains found that they were closely related to other Afroasiatic-speaking populations inhabiting North Africa, parts of the Horn of Africa and the Maghreb, as well as to Bronze Age and medieval period Nubians and to specimens from ancient Jericho. The Naqada skeletons were also morphologically proximate to modern osteological series from Europe and the Indian subcontinent. However, the Naqada skeletons and these ancient and recent skeletons were phenotypically distinct from skeletons belonging to modern Niger-Congo-speaking populations inhabiting Sub-Saharan Africa and Tropical Africa, as well as from Mesolithic skeletons excavated at Wadi Halfa in the Nile Valley.

However, another study by Brace et al. (2006) based on 24 craniofacial measures/variables, found close affinities between Naqada Bronze, Somalis, Nubia Bronze, Nubians, and to a lesser extent, Tanzania Haya, Dahomey, and Congo. On the other hand, lower similarities were found between the Naqada sample and the other regions of the world, which included samples named Middle East, Berber, Tunisia, Algeria, Egypt, Morocco, Italy amongst others, with the exception of the Israeli Fellaheen who also plotted with Naqada Bronze.

In 1998, Joel Irish reported that a number of findings found Nubians, Egyptians, and North Africans share more morphological and dental affinities with Western Asia and the Mediterranean than they do with Sub-Saharan Africa, at least since the Neolithic.

In 1996, Lovell and Prowse reported the presence of individuals buried at Naqada in what they interpreted to be elite, high status tombs, showing them to be an endogamous ruling or elite segment who were significantly different from individuals buried in two other, apparently nonelite cemeteries, and more closely related morphologically to populations in Northern Nubia than those in Southern Egypt.

Nancy Lovell wrote in 1999 that studies of skeletal remains indicate that the physical characteristics of ancient southern Egyptians and Nubians were "within the range of variation" for both ancient and modern indigenous peoples of the Sahara and tropical Africa, and that the distribution of population characteristics "seems to follow a clinal pattern from south to north", which may be explained by natural selection as well as gene flow between neighboring populations. She also wrote that the archaeological and inscriptional evidence for contact between Egypt and Syro-Palestine "suggests that gene flow between these areas was very likely," and that the early Nile Valley populations were "part of an African lineage, but exhibiting local variation".

This view was also shared by the late Egyptologist Frank Yurco.

Egyptologist Barry Kemp (2005) has reviewed the available skulls and skeletal evidence on the ancient Egyptians. He observes that skeletons from earlier periods, which would help elucidate the origin of the Predynastic Egyptians, are rare, and that the amount of samples available for study are "microscopically small". Kemp states that it is dangerous to take one set of skeletons and use them to characterize the population of the whole of Egypt, because there is no single ancient Egyptian population to study, but rather a diversity of local populations. Specifically, he criticises the methodology of skewed databases such as the CRANID software and states "If, on the other hand, CRANID had used one of the Elephantine populations of the same period, the geographic association would be much more with the African groups to the south". He notes also that Predynastic skulls from Upper Egypt appear to be noticeably different in their measurements from an Old Kingdom group from tombs around the pyramids of Giza.

Kemp found that samples from Elephantine (the border between Upper Egypt and Lower Nubia) from the 6th to 26th Dynasties showed very strong affinities with the Nubian population, in a comparison involving physical characteristics of populations from Africa, the Near East, and the Mediterranean; on the other hand, samples from northern Egypt (Merimde, Maadi, and the Wadi Digla) from before the 1st Dynasty showed no affinities with samples from Palestine and Byblos, and the proportions of members of these Egyptians group them with Africans, not Europeans. On the other hand, Kemp found affinities between Palestinian migrants at Tell el-Dab'a (in the Nile Delta) from the Second Intermediate Period and ancient populations from the Near East. Finally, Kemp argues that the most honest way to reconstruct an ancient Egyptian scene is to use the modern population of Egypt as a guide, although this will not lead to exactly the right conclusions.

In 2007, Strouhal et al. described the physical features of ancient A-Group Nubians as "Caucasoid" which were "not distinguishable from the contemporary Predynastic Upper Egyptians of the Badarian and Nagadian cultures" based in reference to previous anthropological studies from 1975 and 1985.

Sonia Zakrzewski in 2007 noted that population continuity occurs over the Egyptian Predynastic into the Greco-Roman periods, and that a relatively high level of genetic differentiation was sustained over this time period. She concluded therefore that the process of state formation itself may have been mainly an indigenous process, but that it may have occurred in association with in-migration, particularly during the Early Dynastic and Old Kingdom periods.

A 1992 study conducted by S.O.Y. Keita on First Dynasty crania from the royal tombs in Abydos, noted the predominant pattern was "Southern" or a "tropical African variant" (though others were also observed), which had affinities with Kerma Kushites. The general results demonstrate greater affinity with Upper Nile Valley groups, but also suggest clear change from earlier craniometric trends. The gene flow and movement of northern officials to the important southern city may explain the findings.

In 2005, Keita examined Badarian crania from predynastic upper Egypt in comparison to various European and tropical African crania. He found that the predynastic Badarian series clustered much closer with the tropical African series. The comparative samples were selected based on "Brace et al.'s (1993) comments on the affinities of an upper Egyptian/Nubian epipalaeolithic series".

In 2008, Keita found the early predynastic groups in Southern Egypt which included Badarian skeletal samples, were similar to Nile-Valley remains from areas to the south and north of Upper Egypt. Overall, the dynastic Egyptians (includes both Upper and Lower Egyptians) showed much closer affinities with these particular Northeast African populations. In his comparison to the various Egyptian series, Greeks, Somali/Horn, and Italians were used. He also concluded that more material was needed to make a firm conclusion about the relationship between the early Holocene Nile valley populations and later ancient Egyptians.

In 2013, Terrazas et al. conducted a comparative craniometric analysis of paleolithic to modern crania from different parts of the continent. The purpose of the research, was to test certain hypothesis about the possible origins and evolution of the earliest people in Africa. In it, the dynastic Egyptian skulls were morphologically closest to Afroasiatic-speaking populations from the Horn region. Both of these fossil series were distinct from the analyzed prehistoric crania of North Africa and the Horn of Africa, including the Pleistocene Rabat skull, Herto Homo sapiens idaltu fossil and Early Holocene Kef Oum Touiza skeleton. The scientists suggest this may indicate that the Afroasiatic-speaking groups settled in the area during a later epoch, having possibly arrived from the Middle East, although the affinity of Egyptian and Horn of Africa skulls with Middle Eastern skulls is not tested in the study, which is limited to examining African series. Therefore, people in Northern and Eastern Africa would have been the result of the mixture between local people and immigrants from Asia.

In 2018, Godde assessed population relationships in the Nile Valley by comparing crania from 18 Egyptian and Nubian groups, spanning from Lower Egypt to Lower Nubia across 7,400 years. Overall, the results showed that the Mesolithic Nubian sample had a greater similarity with Naqada Egyptians. Similarly, Lower Nubian and Upper Egyptian samples clustered together. However, the Lower Egyptian samples formed a homogeneous unit, and there was a north–south gradient in the data set.

In 2020, Godde analysed a series of crania, including two Egyptian (predynastic Badarian and Nagada series), a series of A-Group Nubians and a Bronze Age series from Lachish, Palestine. The two pre-dynastic series had strongest affinities, followed by closeness between the Nagada and the Nubian series. Further, the Nubian A-Group plotted nearer to the Egyptians and the Lachish sample placed more closely to Naqada than Badari. According to Godde the spatial-temporal model applied to the pattern of biological distances explains the more distant relationship of Badari to Lachish than Naqada to Lachish as gene flow will cause populations to become more similar over time.

==== Modern Egyptians ====
Patricia Smith, in her entry noted that "the biological characteristics of modern Egyptians show a north-south cline, reflecting their geographic location between sub-Saharan Africa and the Levant. This is expressed in DNA, blood groups, serum proteins and genetic disorders (Filon 1996; Hammer et al. 1998; Krings et al. 1999). They can also be expressed in phenotypic characteristics that can be identified in teeth and bones (Crichton 1966; Froment 1992; Keita 1996). These characteristics include head form, facial and nasal characteristics, jaw relationships, tooth size, morphology and upper/lower limb proportions. In all these features, Modern Egyptians resemble Sub-Saharan Africans (Howells 1989, Keita 1995)."

Pagani, Luca et al. (2012) stated "that North Africans share substantially more variation with non-African populations (80%) than do Ethiopians (40%–50%)" with a PCA analysis performed on a sample of two Egyptians. The Sub-Saharan African ancestry in 135 Modern Egyptian samples from Abusir-el-Meleq ranged from 14 to 21% according to Schuenemann et al. (2017). Gad et al. (2020) described recent studies which were conducted on modern Egyptian samples had produced predominantly European or west Eurasian haplogroups.

=== Sereological evidence ===
Blood typing on ancient Egyptian mummies is scant. A study published in 1982 found that blood typing of dynastic mummies found ABO frequencies to be most similar to primarily modern Egyptians, and some also to Northern Haratin populations. ABO blood group distribution shows that the Egyptians form a sister group to North African populations including Berbers, Nubians and Canary Islanders.

=== Limb ratios ===
Trikhanus (1981) found Egyptians to plot closest to tropical Africans and not Mediterranean Europeans residing in a roughly similar climatic area.

Robins and Shute (1983) performed X-ray measurements on the physical proportions of ancient Egyptian pharaohs from the 18th and 19th dynasties such as Thutmose III, Amenhotep III, Tutankhamun, Seti I and Rameses II. The authors reported that the limbs of the pharaohs, like those of other Ancient Egyptians, had "negroid characteristics", in that the distal segments were relatively long in comparison with the proximal segments. An exception was Ramesses II, who appears to have had short legs below the knees. According to Robins and Shute (1986) the average limb elongation ratios among pre-dynastic ancient Egyptians is higher than that of modern West Africans who reside much closer to the equator. Robins and Shute therefore term these ancient Egyptians to be "super-negroid" but state that although the body plans of the ancient Egyptians were closer to those of modern negroes than for modern whites, "this does not mean that the ancient Egyptians were negroes".

Anthropologist S.O.Y. Keita (1993) criticized Robins and Shute, stating they do not interpret their results within an adaptive context, and stating that they imply "misleadingly" that early southern Egyptians were not a "part of the Saharo-tropical group, which included Negroes".

Anthropologist C. Loring Brace (1993) points out that limb elongation is "clearly related to the dissipation of metabolically generated heat" in areas of higher ambient temperature. He also stated that "skin color intensification and distal limb elongation is apparent wherever people have been long-term residents of the tropics". He also points out that the term "super negroid" is inappropriate, as it is also applied to non-negroid populations. These features have been observed among Egyptian samples.

Zakrzewski (2003) studied skeletal samples from the Badarian period to the Middle Kingdom in Upper Egypt. Her raw data suggested that the Ancient Egyptians in general had "tropical body plans" but that their proportions were actually "super-negroid", i.e. the limb indices are relatively longer than in many "African" populations. She proposed that the apparent development of an increasingly African body plan over time may also be due to Nubian mercenaries being included in the Middle Kingdom sample. Although, she noted that in spite of the differences in tibae lengths among the Badarian and Early Dynastic samples, that "all samples lie relatively clustered together as compared to the other populations". Zakrzewski concluded that the "results must remain provisional due to the relatively small sample sizes and the lack of skeletal material that cross-cuts all social and economic groups within each time period."

Zakrzewski in 2006 examined the biological diversity found within a series of Predynastic skeletal populations from Middle and Upper Egypt. She found a significant change in the length of the distal limb segments through the Predynastic into the Early Dynastic period. She concluded that early Egyptian populations were not a homogeneous entity, but consisted of local groups with reasonably distinct identities. She also concluded that the State formation process was not an entirely indigenous development, but rather that other groups from elsewhere along the Egyptian Nile Valley as well as from other nearby regions also inter-married with the original Egyptian population.

Barry Kemp (2007) surveyed the pre-dynastic populations of northern Egypt, Palestine to the north and Sudan to the south. He stated that "the limb-length proportions of males from Egyptians sites group them with Africans rather than Europeans".

A 2008 study compared ancient Egyptian osteology to that of African-Americans and White Americans, and found that "although ancient Egyptians are closer in body proportion to modern American Blacks than they are to American Whites, proportions in Blacks and Egyptians are not identical." Also, the samples featured in the study originated and "were measured predominantly in Giza".

Gallagher et al. (2009) also points out that "body proportions are under strong climatic selection and evidence remarkable stability within regional lineages".

Raxter (2011) noted that "Ancient Egyptians as a whole generally exhibit intermediate body breadths relative to higher and lower latitude populations, with Lower Egyptians possessing wider body breadths, as well as lower brachial and crural indices, compared to Upper Egyptians and Upper Nubians. This may suggest that Egyptians are closely related to circum-Mediterranean and/or Near Eastern groups, but quickly developed limb length proportions more suited to their present very hot environments. These results may also reflect the greater plasticity of limb length compared to body breadth." Nonetheless, Raxter acknowledges that although the study has larger samples than previous reports, it could have benefited from more data from particular periods and sites. "Larger samples from both Early and Late Predynastic groups would allow a closer examination of biological changes in the transition to agriculture."

A 2014 study by Bleuze et al. examined skeletal samples from a Kellis 2 cemetery which was "occupied during the Late Ptolemaic through Roman periods" and found the "brachial and crural indices" of the Kellis 2 samples were not significantly different from the Egyptian, Upper Nubians and Lower Nubian samples. Although, the authors cautioned that "the high intralimb indices and greater body mass relative to stature in the Kellis 2 sample suggest that generalized terms to categorize Egyptians, such as "tropical," "Negroid," and "super-Negroid" may be grossly inaccurate, and may additionally obscure localized adaptations within larger geographical areas."

=== Dental morphology ===
Modern studies on ancient Egyptian dentition clusters the Ancient Egyptians with Caucasoids (Europeans and Western Asians) who have small teeth, as opposed to Negroids (Western Sub-Saharan Africans) who have megadont/large teeth.

A study in 2006 concluded that the Neolithic Egyptians and subsequent predynastic Egyptians may have been connected, there may have been a close relation between predynastic Naqada and Badarian peoples, and that this connection might have continued into the Dynastic period and possibly into post-dynastic times. A 2012 university thesis considered the archaeological site of ancient Kellis, in the Dakhleh Oasis of Egypt, which was geographically isolated in ancient times. A comparison between the Kellis skeletal remains and other regional groups found that the Kellis population was more closely affiliated with other North African populations such as Lower Nubian groups than with Sub-Saharan African samples, although they are still relatively distinct from the comparative groups.

Joel Irish (1998) examined 32 Sub-Saharan and North African dental samples dating from the late Upper Pleistocene to modern times. He found that North Africans are similar to Europeans and western Asians to some degree, whereas Sub-Saharan-affiliated Africans are very different to all others. A separate 1998 paper by the same author, based on numerically derived affinities using the multivariate Mean Measure of Divergence statistic, reported that Sub-Saharan samples were significantly different to samples from North Africa, Europe and elsewhere.

A 2006 bioarchaeological study on the dental morphology of ancient Egyptians in Upper Egypt by Joel Irish found that their dental traits were most similar to those of other Nile Valley populations, with more remote ties with Bronze Age to Christian period Nubians (e.g. A-Group, C-Group, Kerma) and other Afro-Asiatic speaking populations in Northeast Africa (Tigrean). Moreover, the Egyptian groups were generally distinct from the sampled West and Central African populations. Among the samples included in the study is skeletal material from the Hawara tombs of Fayum, (from the Roman period) which clustered very closely with the Badarian series of the predynastic period. All the samples, particularly those of the Dynastic period, were significantly divergent from a Neolithic West Saharan sample from Lower Nubia. Biological continuity was also found intact from the dynastic to the post-pharaonic periods.

Irish (2008) conducted a morphological comparison between the dental traits of human remains from Lower Nubian Neolithic sites at Gebel Ramlah (modern Southern Egypt) and Upper Nubian Neolithic sites from the cemeteries at R12 (modern Northern Sudan). Irish compared these remains to pooled dental samples from post-Neolithic Egyptians and Nubians to determine and distinguish biological affiliatations in the regional context. He concluded that the Lower Nubian samples of Gebel Ramlah and the Upper Nubian samples of R12 were not closely related biologically, whereas the post-Neolithic Egyptians and Nubians were closely related based on the Mean Measure of Divergence statistical analysis of 36 dental traits from the samples. This apparent homogeneity was attributed to population interaction stemming from a combination of trade, migration and genetic exchange along the River Nile, whereas the earlier Neolithic groups were more isolated from each other, both spatially and genetically.

Biological anthropologist Shomarka Keita takes issue with the suggestion of Irish that Egyptians and Nubians were not primary descendants of the African epipaleolithic and Neolithic populations. Keita also criticizes him for ignoring the possibility that the dentition of the ancient Egyptians could have been caused by "in situ microevolution" driven by dietary change, rather than by racial admixture.

Eric Crubezy (2010) found that a predynastic cemetery in Adaima in Upper Egypt showed "Khoisan" dental markers (formally referred to as "Bushmen canine"). He also noted that the dental features had a very frequent anatomical variation in some African populations such as the Khoisans and added in reference to the Adaima sample that "the African origin of the population, already widely suspected is confirmed here".

In 2023, Christopher Ehret reported that physical anthropological findings, performed by Keita and Zakrzewski, on the "major burial sites of those founding locales of ancient Egypt in the fourth millennium BCE, notably El-Badari as well as Naqada, show no demographic indebtedness to the Levant". Ehret specified that these studies revealed cranial and dental affinities with "closest parallels" to other longtime populations in the surrounding areas of Northeastern Africa "such as Nubia and the northern Horn of Africa". He further commented that the Naqada and Badarian populations did not migrate "from somewhere else but were descendants of the long-term inhabitants of these portions of Africa going back many millennia". However, older dental and morphological studies have shown that Egyptians and Nubians (as the rest of North Africa) share more affinities with West Asian and Mediterranean populations, although these studies have also identified many Sub-Saharan influented traits, based on traits that are not strongly impacted by selection.

== Language element ==
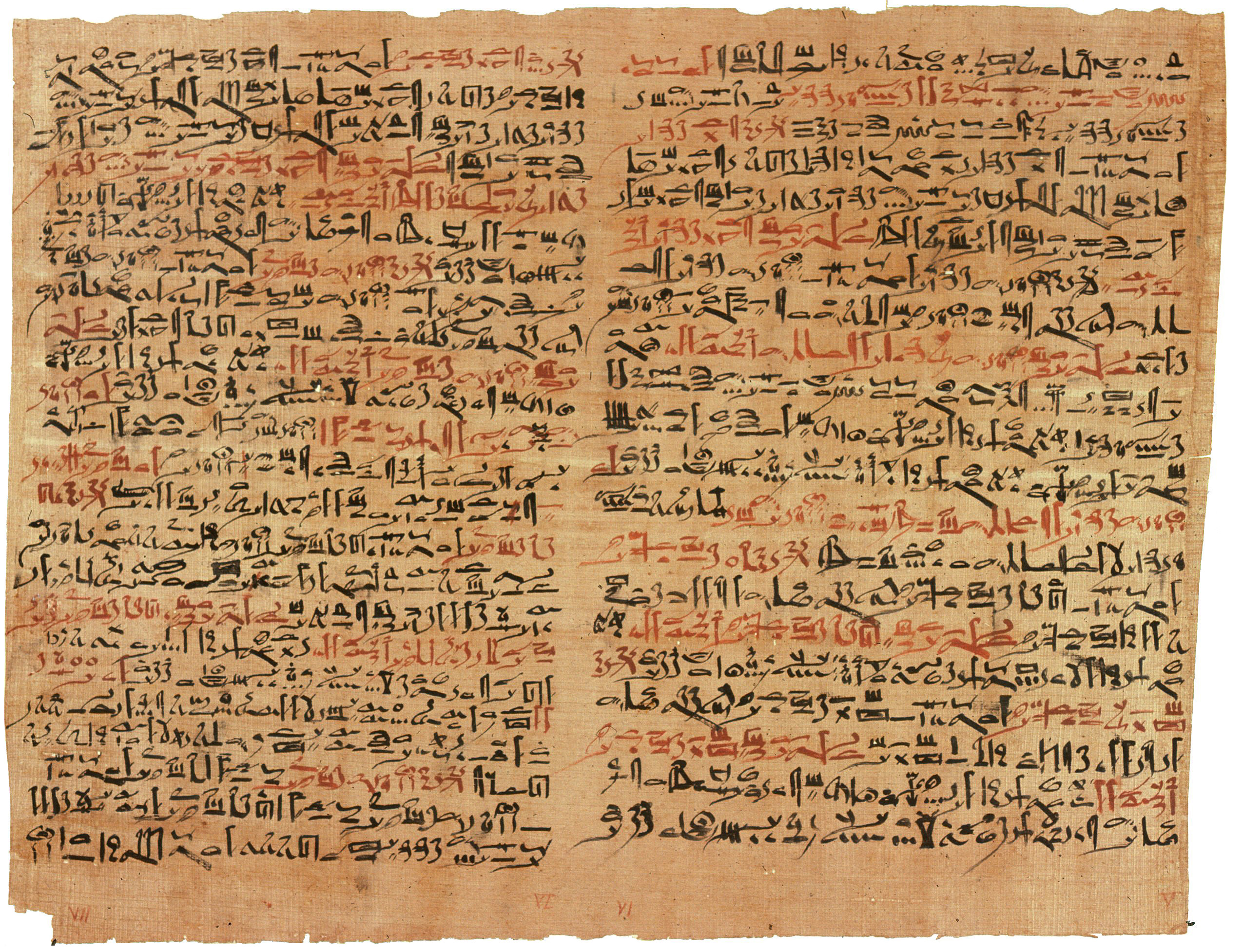
The Edwin Smith papyrus, the world's oldest surviving surgical document, written in Hieratic script c. 1600 BCE

The Ancient Egyptian language is classified into six major chronological divisions: Archaic Egyptian, Old Egyptian, Middle Egyptian, Late Egyptian, Demotic Egyptian and Coptic. The last was used as a working language until the 18th century CE. It is still used today as a liturgical language by Egyptian Copts.

=== Origins ===
The Ancient Egyptian language has been classified as a member of the Afroasiatic language family. Of the other Afroasiatic branches, linguists have variously suggested that the Egyptian language shares its greatest affinities with neighbouring Berber and Semitic languages, particularly Hebrew. However, other scholars have argued the Ancient Egyptian language likewise shared linguistic ties with north-eastern African regions.

Christopher Ehret describes the oldest speakers of the Afro-Asiatic language family as "a set of peoples whose lands between 15,000 and 13,000 BCE stretched from Nubia in the west to far northern Somalia in the east." Ehret, in a separate publication, argued that the two principles in linguistic approaches for determining the origin of languages which are the principles of fewest moves and greatest diversity had put "beyond reasonable doubt" that the language family "had originated in the Horn of Africa". Robert Morkot inferred that "Ancient Egyptian belongs to a language group known as 'Afro-Asiatic' (formerly called Hamito-Semitic) and its closest relatives are other north-east African languages from Somalia to Chad".

Russell Schuh, in an article criticizing the Hamitic theory and Cheikh Anta Diop's attempt to link the Wolof language with Egyptian, argues that other Afrasian languages also share features with Egyptian, such as the Chadic languages of west and central Africa, the Cushitic languages of northeast Africa, and the Ethio-Semitic languages, which are found in Ethiopia and Eritrea.

There is no agreement on when and where these languages originated, though the language is generally believed to have originated somewhere in or near the region stretching from the Levant in the Near East to northern Kenya, and from the Eastern Sahara in North Africa to the Red Sea, or Southern Arabia, Ethiopia and Sudan.

There are however many scholars who accept an African phylum language origin since five of the six Afro-Asiatic subfamilies are spoken on the African continent, and only one in Asia. The languages of the neighbouring Nubian people belong to the Nilo-Saharan language family, and thus not an Afroasiatic language.

However, the Cushitic language which is a sub-branch of the Afro-Asiatic language family was spoken in Lower Nubia, an ancient region which extends from Upper Egypt to Northern Sudan, before the arrival of North Eastern Sudanic languages in the Middle Nile Valley.

== See also ==
- Demographics of Egypt
- Genetic history of North Africa
- Genetic history of the Middle East
- Ancient Egyptian race controversy
- African humid period
- Saharan pump theory
