= Egypt, West Virginia =

Unincorporated community in West Virginia, United States

- Unincorporated community
- Location within West Virginia Location within the United States
- Coordinates: 39°21′7″N 77°56′51″W
- Country: United States
- State: West Virginia
- County: Jefferson
- Time zone: UTC-5 (Eastern (EST))
  - Summer (DST): UTC-4 (EDT)
- GNIS ID: 1554377

Egypt is an unincorporated community in Jefferson County, West Virginia, United States. It is located between Opequon Creek and Leetown off Sulphur Spring Road on Egypt Road.
