= Egyptian (1826 ship) =

UK merchant ship (1826–1839)

History

United Kingdom
- Name: Egyptian
- Builder: Quebec
- Launched: 1826
- Fate: Last listed 1838

General characteristics
- Tons burthen: 316, or 325 (bm)

Egyptian was launched in 1826 at Quebec. She made a voyage to Mauritius, sailing under a licence from the British East India Company (EIC). She was last listed in 1838.

== Career ==
Egyptian, Friend, master, arrived at Gravesend, Kent from Quebec on 7 December 1826.

Egyptian first appeared in Lloyd's Register (LR), in the volume for 1827.

Year	Master	Owner	Trade	Source
1827	Friend; Renoldson	Gale & Son [W.D.] Dowson & Co.	London–Isle de France (Mauritius)	LR

In 1813 the EIC had lost its monopoly on the trade between India and Britain. British ships were then free to sail to India or the Indian Ocean under a licence from the EIC.

On 3 June 1827 Egyptian Ronoldson, master, sailed from England for Mauritius.

Year	Master	Owner	Trade	Source
1831	Renoldson; Spurs	[W.D.] Dowson & Co.	London–Île de France	LR

A letter from Elsinore dated 22 November 1831 reported that Egyptian, Spiers, master, had to put into Christiansand leaky, and having lost her rudder. She would have to unload to effect repairs. She had been on her way from Riga to Portsmouth.

Year	Master	Owner	Trade	Source
1832	Spurs	Spurs	London–Baltic	LR
1834	Sweetland	Vallance	Liverpool	LR; new topsides and deck 1832

In 1834 Egyptian, Sweetland, master, arrived at Liverpool with a cargo of palm oil, munjeet (Munjeet or Indian madder (Rubia cordifolia), wool, quercitron bark, rosewood, logwood, safflower, fustic, horn tips, and wet ox and cow hides.

Year	Master	Owner	Trade	Source
1838	Dinmond	Vallance	Teignmouth–Newfoundland	LR; new topsides and deck 1828, and repairs 1837

== Fate ==
Egyptian was last listed in 1838.

Egyptian, of Liverpool, was wrecked on the Pratas Shoal in 1840. She was on a voyage from Liverpool to China. She had acquired a cargo of opium at Singapore that she was taking to China via Manila.
