= Oriental Orthodoxy in Egypt =

Oriental Orthodoxy in Egypt represents Christians in Egypt who are adherents of Oriental Orthodoxy. In demographic terms, Oriental Orthodox Christians constitute the majority of Christians in Egypt.

The main denomination of Oriental Orthodoxy in Egypt is the Coptic Orthodox Church of Alexandria. The seat of the Pope of the Coptic Orthodox Church of Alexandria is currently occupied by Pope Tawadros II. Also, there are some 8000 Oriental Orthodox Armenians in Egypt and some 500 Oriental Orthodox Christians of the Syriac Orthodox Church.

== See also ==
- Christianity in Egypt
- Eastern Orthodoxy in Egypt
- Roman Catholicism in Egypt
- Protestantism in Egypt
- Religion in Egypt
- Freedom of religion in Egypt
- Human rights in Egypt

== Bibliography ==
- Betts, Robert B. (1978). Christians in the Arab East: A Political Study (2nd revised ed.). Athens: Lycabettus Press. ISBN 9780804207966.
- Brakke, David (2008). "The East: Egypt and Palestine". The Oxford Handbook of Early Christian Studies. Oxford: Oxford University Press. pp. 344–364. ISBN 978-0-19-927156-6.
- Brock, Sebastian P. (2016). "Miaphysite, not Monophysite!". Cristianesimo Nella Storia. 37 (1): 45–52. ISBN 9788815261687.
- Corbon, Jean (1998). "The Churches of the Middle East: Their Origins and Identity, from their Roots in the Past to their Openness to the Present". Christian Communities in the Arab Middle East: The Challenge of the Future. Oxford: Clarendon Press. pp. 92–110. ISBN 978-0-19-829388-0.
- Grillmeier, Aloys; Hainthaler, Theresia (1996). Christ in Christian Tradition: The Church of Alexandria with Nubia and Ethiopia after 451. Vol. 2/4. Louisville: Westminster John Knox Press. ISBN 9780664223007.
- Meyendorff, John (1989). Imperial unity and Christian divisions: The Church 450–680 A.D. Crestwood, NY: St. Vladimir's Seminary Press. ISBN 9780881410563.
- Ostrogorsky, George (1956). History of the Byzantine State. Oxford: Basil Blackwell.
- Winkler, Dietmar W. (1997). "Miaphysitism: A New Term for Use in the History of Dogma and in Ecumenical Theology". The Harp. 10 (3): 33–40.
