= Demographics of Egypt =

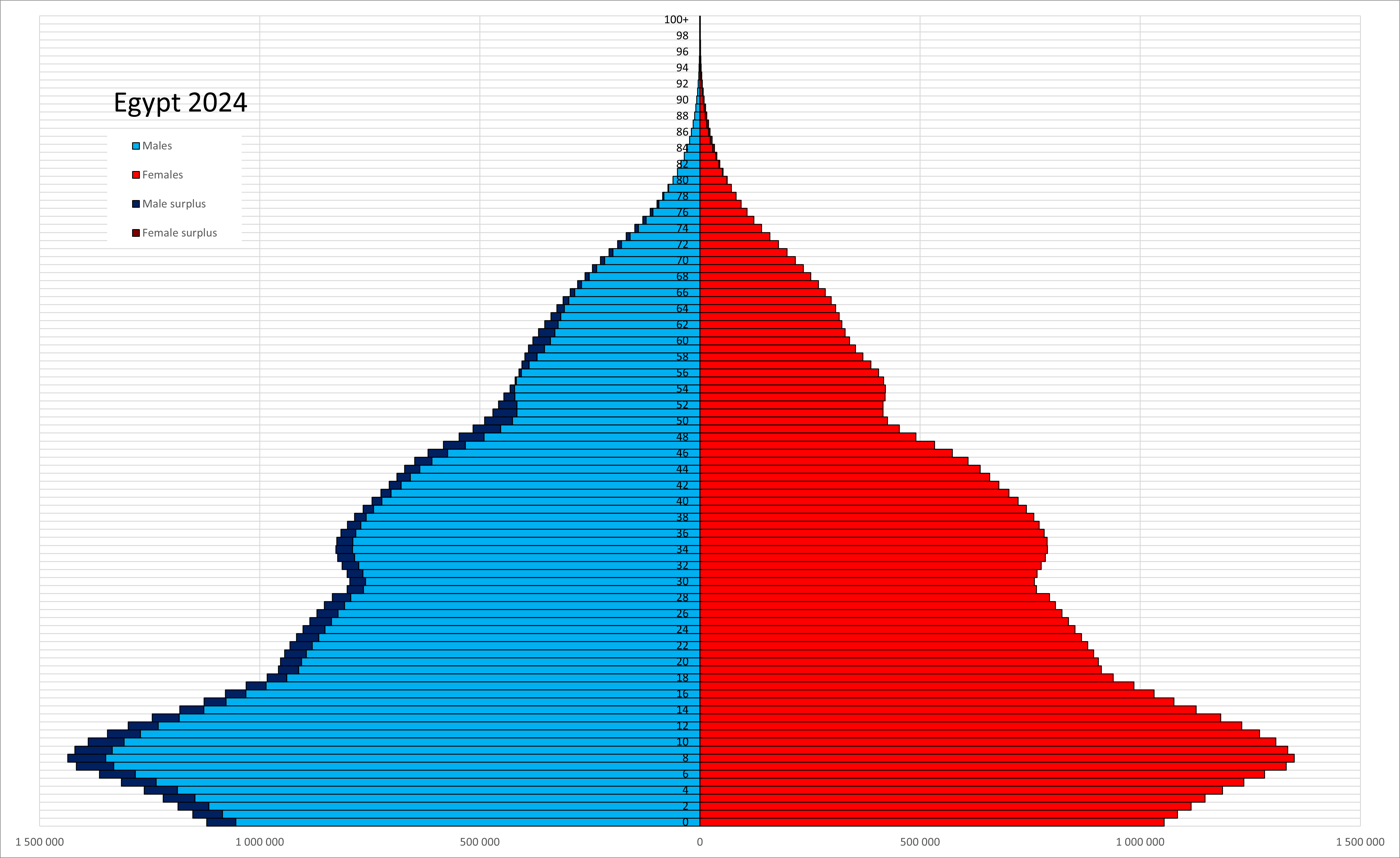
- Population pyramid of Egypt in 2024
- Population: 116,538,258 (2024 est.)
- Growth rate: 1.4% (2023 est.)
- Birth rate: 18.5 births/1,000 population (2024)
- Death rate: 5.7 deaths/1,000 population (2024)
- Life expectancy: 74.45 years
  - male: 73.26 years
  - female: 75.72 years
- Fertility rate: 2.34 children/woman (2025)
- Infant mortality: 67.7 deaths/1,000 live births
- Net migration rate: -0.31 migrant(s)/1,000 population
- Immigrant share: 1.0% (2024)

Sex ratio
- Total: 1.07 male(s)/female (2022 est.)
- At birth: 1.06 male(s)/female

Nationality
- Nationality: Egyptian
- Major ethnic: Egyptians
- Minor ethnic: Copts; Nubians; Turks; Bedouin; Beja; Sudanese Arabs; Doms; Greeks; Siwans; Hungarians; Other groups

Language
- Official: Arabic

Egypt is the most populous country in the Middle East, and the third-most populous on the African continent, after Nigeria and Ethiopia. About 95% of the country's 119 million people (May 2025) live along the banks of the Nile and in the Nile Delta, which fans out north of Cairo; and along the Suez Canal. These regions are among the world's most densely populated, containing an average of over 1,540 people per km^{2}, as compared to 96 persons per km^{2} for the country as a whole.

Small communities spread throughout the desert regions of Egypt are clustered around historic trade and transportation routes. The government has tried with mixed success to encourage migration to newly irrigated land reclaimed from the desert. However, the proportion of the population living in rural areas has continued to decrease as people move to the megacities in search of employment and a higher standard of living.

According to the Peterson Institute for International Economics and other proponents of demographic structural approach (cliodynamics), Egypt's unemployment rate is driven by a demographic youth bulge: with the number of new people entering the job force at about 4% a year, unemployment in Egypt is almost 10 times as high for college graduates as it is for people who have gone through elementary school, particularly educated urban youth, who comprised most of the people that were seen out in the streets during the Egyptian revolution of 2011. An estimated 51.2% of Egyptians are under the age of 25, with just 4.3% over the age of 65, making it one of the most youthful populations in the world.

== Population size and distribution ==
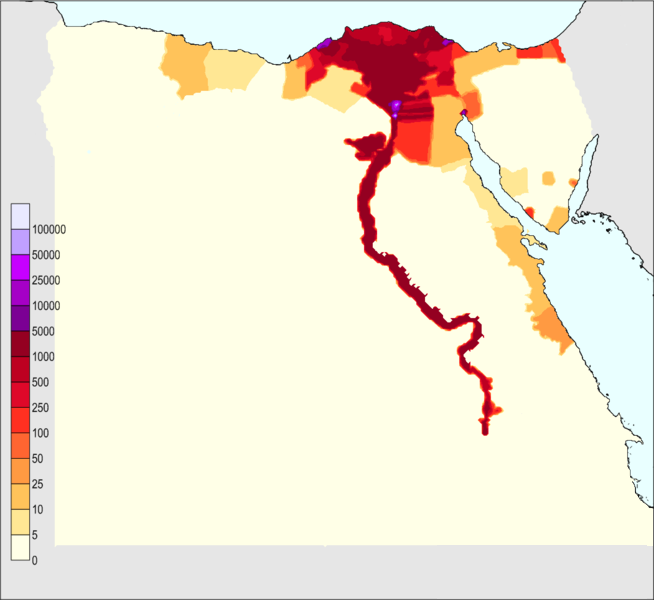
2010 population density

Egypt has a population of 116,538,000 (2024 UN estimate). According to the OECD/World Bank statistics population growth in Egypt from 1990 to 2008 was 23.7 million and 41%.

View source data.
View source data.

=== History ===
Historical population growth in Egypt; data from Our World in Data

Historical population over time

Year	Pop.	±% p.a.
1	4,000,000	—
1000	8,000,000	+0.07%
1500	7,300,000	−0.02%
1805	4,000,000	−0.20%
1882	6,712,000	+0.67%
1897	9,669,000	+2.46%
1907	11,190,000	+1.47%
1917	12,718,000	+1.29%
1927	14,178,000	+1.09%

Year	Pop.	±% p.a.
1937	15,921,000	+1.17%
1947	18,967,000	+1.77%
1960	26,085,000	+2.48%
1966	30,076,000	+2.40%
1976	36,626,000	+1.99%
1986	48,254,000	+2.80%
1996	59,312,000	+2.08%
2006	72,798,000	+2.07%
2017	93,287,000	+2.28%

Source: Population in Egypt

=== Age distribution ===
Data taken from Central Agency for Public Mobilization and Statistics.

Percentage distribution of population in censuses (1976, 1986, 1996, 2006) by age group

Percentage distribution of population in censuses by age group

Age group	2006	1996	1986	1976
0–4	10.6	11.6	15.3	13.9
5–9	10.5	12.9	13.2	12.8
10–14	10.6	13.3	11.6	13.4
15–19	11.8	11.6	10.6	10.9
20–24	10.8	8.6	8.9	8.4
25–29	8.8	7.4	7.7	7.3
30–34	6.5	6.7	6.4	5.8
35–39	6.4	6.5	6.1	5.6
40–44	5.6	5.3	4.4	5.1
45–49	5.1	4.5	4.0	4.2
50–54	4.2	3.4	3.5	4.0
55–59	3.1	2.5	2.6	2.4
60–64	2.3	2.4	2.4	2.7
65–69	1.6	1.6	1.4	1.4
70–74	1.1	1.0	1.1	1.2
75+	1.0	0.8	0.8	1.0

Population estimates by sex and age group (1 July 2010)

Population estimates by sex and age group (1 July 2010):

Age group	Male	Female	%	Total
0–4	4,282	4,072	10.6	8,354
5–9	4,265	4,007	10.5	8,272
10–14	4,330	4,023	10.6	8,353
15–19	4,738	4,501	11.7	9,239
20–24	4,358	4,155	10.8	8,513
25–29	3,412	3,498	8.8	6,910
30–34	2,614	2,503	6.5	5,117
35–39	2,498	2,536	6.4	5,034
40–44	2,237	2,186	5.6	4,423
45–49	2,029	1,942	5.0	3,971
50–54	1,668	1,640	4.2	3,308
55–59	1,312	1,136	3.1	2,448
60–64	971	871	2.3	1 842
65–69	693	597	1.6	1 290
70–74	435	419	1.1	854
75+	408	392	1.0	800
Total	40,250	38,478	100	78,728

Population estimates by sex and age group (1 July 2012)

Population estimates by sex and age group (1 July 2012):

Age group	Male	Female	%	Total
0–4	4,780	4,410	11.17	9,190
5–9	4,534	4,192	10.60	8,726
10–14	3,970	3,706	9.33	7,676
15–19	3,970	3,746	9.37	7,710
20–24	4,236	4,024	10.04	8,260
25–29	4,084	3,924	9.73	8,008
30–34	3,346	3,249	8.01	6,595
35–39	2,589	2,524	6.21	5,113
40–44	2,262	2,206	5.43	4,468
45–49	2,077	2,037	5.00	4,114
50–54	1,821	1,798	4.40	3,619
55–59	1,494	1,480	3.61	2,974
60–64	1,105	1,113	2.69	2,218
65–69	767	785	1.89	1,552
70–74	501	517	1.24	1,018
75+	522	536	1.29	1,058
Total	42,058	40,247	100	82,305

Population estimates by sex and age group (1 January 2013)

Population estimates by sex and age group (1 January 2013):

Age group	Male	Female	%	Total
0–4	4,861	4,481	11.17	9,342
5–9	4,610	4,259	10.60	8,869
10–14	4,038	3,765	9.33	7,803
15–67	4,038	3,805	9.37	7,843
20–24	4,309	4,089	10.04	8,398
25–29	4,152	3,987	9.73	8,139
30–34	3,403	3,300	8.01	6,703
35–39	2,633	2,564	6.21	5,197
40–44	2,300	2,241	5.43	4,541
45–49	2,113	2,069	5.00	4,182
50–54	1,852	1,827	4.40	3,679
55–59	1,519	1,504	3.61	3,023
60–64	1,124	1,130	2.69	2,254
65–69	781	797	1.89	1,578
70–74	510	525	1.24	1,035
75–79	291	303	0.71	594
80+	239	242	0.57	481
Total	42,773	40,888	100	83,661

Population estimates by sex and age group (1 July 2013)

Population estimates by sex and age group (1 July 2013):

Age group	Male	Female	Total	%
0–4	4 910 594	4 538 740	9 449 334	11,17
5–9	4 657 900	4 313 848	8 971 748	10,60
10–14	4 079 894	3 812 951	7 892 845	9,33
15–19	4 079 894	3 853 840	7 933 634	9,37
20–24	4 353 289	4 140 279	8 493 568	10,04
25–29	4 195 561	4 037 843	8 233 404	9,73
30–34	3 438 467	3 342 721	6 781 188	8,01
35–39	2 660 343	2 596 487	5 256 830	6,21
40–44	2 323 857	2 269 370	4 593 227	5,43
45–49	2 134 584	2 095 590	4 230 173	5,00
50–54	1 871 704	1 850 252	3 721 956	4,40
55–59	1 535 218	1 523 136	3 058 354	3,61
60–64	1 135 641	1 144 907	2 280 548	2,69
65–69	788 639	807 569	1 596 208	1,89
70–74	515 244	531 564	1 046 809	1,24
75–79	294 425	306 672	601 097	0,71
80+	241 849	246 108	487 957	0,58
Total	43 217 105	41 411 877	84 628 982	100

Age group	Male	Female	Total	Percent
0–14	13 648 388	12 665 539	26 313 927	31,09
15–64	27 728 560	26 854 425	54 582 985	64,50
65+	1 840 157	1 891 913	3 732 070	4,41

Population estimates by sex and age group (1 July 2014)

Population estimates by sex and age group (1 July 2014) in thousands:

Age group	Male	Female	Total	%
0–4	5 102	4 728	9 830	11,3
5–9	4 729	4 398	9 127	10,5
10–14	4 225	3 959	8 184	9,4
15–19	4 312	4 077	8 389	9,7
20–24	4 565	4 365	8 930	10,4
25–29	4 280	4 119	8 399	9,7
30–34	3 413	3 319	6 732	7,8
35–39	2 678	2 604	5 282	6,1
40–44	2 391	2 349	4 740	5,5
45–49	2 194	2 156	4 350	5,0
50–54	1 898	1 877	3 775	4,3
55–59	1 547	1 536	3 083	3,6
60–64	1 130	1 131	2 261	2,6
65–69	789	801	1 590	1,8
70–74	515	535	1 050	1,2
75+	537	555	1 092	1,3
Total	44 305	42 509	86 814	100

Age group	Sex ratio	Male	Female	Total	Percent
0–14	107.4	14 056	13 085	27 141	31,26
15–39	104.1	19 248	18 484	37 732	43,46
40–64	101.2	9 160	9 049	18 209	20,97
65+	97.4	1 841	1 891	3 732	4,30

Household population by age and sex (DHS 2014)

Household population by age and sex (DHS 2014).

Total population in thousands: 114 428 (Males 56 926, Females 57 501)

Age group	Male (%)	Female (%)	Total (%)
0–4	14,1	12,6	13,4
5–9	12,1	11,1	11,6
10–14	10,7	9,9	10,3
15–19	9,1	9,0	9,1
20–24	7,8	8,6	8,2
25–29	8,2	9,4	8,8
30–34	7,0	7,7	7,3
35–39	5,9	6,2	6,0
40–44	4,8	5,1	4,9
45–49	4,7	4,7	4,7
50–54	4,2	4,5	4,4
55–59	3,4	3,7	3,5
60–64	3,4	3,3	3,4
65–69	2,0	1,9	1,9
70–74	1,4	1,3	1,3
75–79	0,6	0,5	0,5
80+	0,5	0,6	0,6

Age group	Male (%)	Female (%)	Total (%)
0–14	36,9	33,6	35,3
15–64	58,6	62,1	60,4
65+	4,5	4,3	4,3

Population estimates by sex and age group (1 January 2015):

Age group	Male	Female	Total	%
0–4	5 168 230	4 791 812	9 960 042	11,3
5–9	4 790 338	4 456 493	9 246 831	10,5
10–14	4 279 072	4 013 008	8 292 080	9,4
15–19	4 367 988	4 131 991	8 499 979	9,7
20–24	4 623 621	4 424 043	9 047 664	10,3
25–29	4 334 645	4 175 258	8 509 903	9,7
30–34	3 456 601	3 364 004	6 820 605	7,8
35–39	2 711 932	2 639 282	5 351 214	6,1
40–44	2 422 954	2 379 682	4 802 636	5,5
45–49	2 222 893	2 184 980	4 407 873	5,0
50–54	1 922 803	1 903 745	3 826 548	4,4
55–59	1 567 139	1 557 610	3 124 749	3,6
60–64	1 144 789	1 146 574	2 291 363	2,6
65–69	800 241	811 254	1 611 495	1,8
70–74	522 379	540 837	1 063 216	1,2
75+	544 608	562 470	1 107 078	1,3
Total	44 880 233	43 083 043	87 963 276	100

Age group	Male	Female	Total	Percent
0–14	14 237 640	13 261 313	27 498 953	31,26
15–64	28 775 365	27 907 169	56 682 534	64,44
65+	1 867 228	1 914 561	3 781 789	4,30

Historical and present population distribution:

Age group	1 January 2015	1 July 2013	1 January 2013	1 July 2012	1 July 2010	2006	1996	1986	1976
0–14	31.26 (27,498,953)	31.09 (26,313,927)	31.1 (26,014,000)	31.1 (25,592,000)	31.7 (24,979,000)	31.7	37.8	40.1	40
15–64	64.44 (56,682,534)	64.50 (54,582,985)	64.49 (53,959,000)	64.48 (53,085,000)	64.6 (50,805,000)	64.6	58.7	56.6	56.4
65+	4.30 (3,781,789)	4.41 (3,732,070)	4.41 (3,688,000)	4.42 (3,628,000)	3.7 (2,944,000)	3.7	3.5	3.3	3.6

=== Urban and rural population ===
Figures from CAPMAS:

Year	Midyear population	Urban population		Rural population	
Year	Midyear population	in thousands	percent	in thousands	percent
1990	51 911	22 519	43.4%	29 392	56.6%
1991	52 985	22 908	43.2%	30 077	56.8%
1992	54 082	23 366	43.2%	30 716	56.8%
1993	55 201	23 804	43.1%	31 397	56.9%
1994	56 344	24 276	43.1%	32 068	56.9%
1995	57 642	24 709	42.9%	32 933	57.1%
1996	58 835	25 053	42.6%	33 782	57.4%
1997	60 053	25 578	42.6%	34 475	57.4%
1998	61 296	26 104	42.6%	35 192	57.4%
1999	62 565	26 559	42.5%	36 006	57.5%
2000	63 860	27 132	42.5%	36 728	57.5%
2001	65 182	28 118	43.1%	37 064	56.9%
2002	66 628	28 554	42.9%	38 074	57.1%
2003	67 965	29 130	42.9%	38 835	57.1%
2004	69 304	29 653	42.8%	39 651	57.2%
2005	70 653	30 187	42.7%	40 466	57.3%
2006	72 009	30 585	42.5%	41 424	57.5%
2007	73 644	31 720	43.1%	41 924	56.9%
2008	75 194	32 249	42.9%	42 945	57.1%
2009	76 925	33 083	43.0%	43 842	57.0%
2010	78 685	33 804	43.0%	44 881	57.0%
2011	80 530	34 489	42.8%	46 041	57.2%
2012	82 550	35 373	42.9%	47 177	57.1%
2013	84 629	36 213	42.8%	48 416	57.2%
2014	86 814	37 095	42.7%	49 719	57.3%

=== Population projections ===
The Central Agency for Public Mobilization and Statistics (CAPMAS) had released high/medium/low population projections for 2011–2031 based on Final Results of 2006 Population Census. The 2020 high variant was 92.6 million, the medium was 91.0 million, and the low was 90.0 million. The 2030 high variant is 104.4 million, the medium is 101.7 million, and the low is 99.8 million. However the information could be misleading as the 2013 population figure of 84.6 million is higher than the projected high of 83 million. In fact, due to an unexpected rise in the fertility rate (from 3.0 to 3.5), the population already surpassed 91 million on 5 June 2016 while reaching 92 million on 30 November, average population age remaining stable despite a rising life expectancy. Furthermore, as of 2022, the population of Egypt reached 111 million, which is a figure even higher than what is projected for 2030.

== Vital statistics ==
View source data.
View source data.

Demographic statistics according to the World Population Review in 2022.

- One birth every 12 seconds
- One death every 52 seconds
- One net migrant every 13 minutes
- Net gain of one person every 17 seconds

Vital statistics:

	Midyear population	Live births	Deaths	Natural change	Crude birth rate (per 1000)	Crude death rate (per 1000)	Natural change (per 1000)	Crude migration rate (per 1000)	Total fertility rate
1934	15,449,000	651,663	429,851	221,812	42.2	27.8	14.4		6.08
1935	15,624,000	645,760	412,197	233,563	41.3	26.4	14.9	−3.7	5.97
1936	15,801,000	698,186	455,832	242,354	44.2	28.8	15.3	−4.1	5.95
1937	16,009,000	694,086	434,208	259,878	43.4	27.1	16.2	−3.2	5.93
1938	16,300,000	704,376	429,248	275,128	43.2	26.3	16.9	1.0	5.91
1939	16,598,000	696,746	429,033	267,713	42.0	25.8	16.1	1.9	5.90
1940	16,900,000	697,700	444,448	253,252	41.3	26.3	15.0	2.9	5.88
1941	17,208,000	695,016	440,981	254,035	40.4	25.6	14.8	3.1	5.92
1942	17,522,000	658,324	494,358	163,966	37.6	28.2	9.4	8.5	5.97
1943	17,842,000	689,771	492,644	197,127	38.7	27.6	11.0	6.9	6.01
1944	18,167,000	722,166	472,234	249,932	39.8	26.0	13.8	4.1	6.05
1945	18,498,000	787,502	512,003	275,499	42.6	27.7	14.9	3.0	6.10
1946	18,835,000	776,000	484,000	292,000	41.2	25.7	15.5	2.4	6.21
1947	19,197,000	834,557	408,577	425,980	43.5	21.3	22.2	−3.3	6.32
1948	19,529,000	832,728	397,976	434,752	42.6	20.4	22.3	−5.3	6.43
1949	19,989,000	831,310	410,524	420,786	41.6	20.5	21.1	1.9	6.54
1950	21,514,000	904,941	388,944	515,997	44.2	19.0	25.2	45.7	6.65
1951	22,020,000	934,584	402,158	532,426	44.6	19.2	25.4	−2.4	6.66
1952	22,562,000	969,443	380,633	588,810	45.2	17.8	27.5	−3.5	6.69
1953	23,138,000	934,830	429,097	505,733	42.6	19.6	23.0	1.9	6.71
1954	23,747,000	957,158	401,306	555,852	42.6	17.9	24.7	0.9	6.72
1955	24,387,000	926,500	405,663	520,837	40.3	17.6	22.7	3.5	6.73
1956	25,057,000	958,880	384,974	573,906	40.7	16.4	24.4	2.3	6.74
1957	25,756,000	914,494	429,512	484,982	38.0	17.8	20.1	7.0	6.74
1958	26,480,000	1,013,743	409,197	604,546	41.1	16.6	24.5	2.8	6.74
1959	27,228,000	1,078,947	411,188	667,759	42.8	16.3	26.5	1.0	6.73
1960	27,998,000	1,113,888	437,822	676,066	43.0	16.9	26.1	1.4	6.72
1961	28,786,000	1,166,620	420,158	746,462	43.9	15.8	28.1	−0.7	6.70
1962	29,591,000	1,125,798	486,699	639,099	41.3	17.9	23.4	3.8	6.67
1963	30,410,000	1,196,388	431,673	764,715	42.8	15.4	27.4	−0.5	7.65
1964	31,242,000	1,205,785	449,375	756,410	42.1	15.7	26.4	0.2	6.62
1965	32,084,000	1,220,658	411,636	809,022	41.5	14.0	27.5	−1.3	6.58
1966	32,937,000	1,234,976	477,021	757,955	41.0	15.8	25.1	0.8	6.53
1967	33,799,000	1,210,214	440,161	770,053	39.2	14.2	24.9	0.6	6.47
1968	34,660,000	1,206,585	509,430	697,155	38.1	16.1	22.0	2.8	6.40
1969	35,511,000	1,197,245	468,017	729,228	36.8	14.4	22.4	1.6	6.42
1970	36,342,000	1,161,539	500,626	660,913	34.9	15.0	19.8	3.1	6.23
1971	37,152,000	1,186,350	445,192	741,158	34.8	13.1	21.8	0	6.14
1972	37,945,000	1,187,286	499,628	687,658	34.1	14.3	19.7	1.2	7.06
1973	38,734,000	1,259,004	459,816	799,188	35.3	12.9	22.4	−2.0	5.97
1974	39,534,000	1,287,614	457,620	829,994	35.4	12.6	22.8	−2.6	5.90
1975	40,359,000	1,331,799	456,041	875,758	36.0	12.3	23.7	−3.3	5.83
1976	41,213,000	1,378,917	444,228	934,689	36.4	11.7	24.7	−4.0	5.78
1977	42,094,000	1,447,402	457,558	989,844	37.3	11.8	25.5	−4.6	5.73
1978	43,006,000	1,479,698	415,605	1,064,093	37.2	10.5	26.8	−5.8	5.68
1979	43,951,000	1,633,674	444,753	1,188,921	40.0	10.9	29.1	−7.6	5.64
1980	44,932,000	1,569,247	421,227	1,148,020	37.3	10.0	27.3	−5.5	5.60
1981	45,946,000	1,593,698	432,264	1,161,434	36.8	10.0	26.8	−4,7	5.57
1982	46,991,000	1,601,265	441,621	1,159,644	34.1	9.4	24.7	−2.5	5.53
1983	48,072,000	1,666,915	412,700	1,254,215	34.7	8.6	26.1	−3.6	5.49
1984	49,190,000	1,797,206	400,600	1,396,606	36.5	8.1	28.4	4.9	5.44
1985	50,347,000	1,903,022	442,258	1,460,764	37.8	8.8	29.0	−6.0	5.38
1986	51,545,000	1,907,975	455,888	1,452,087	37.0	8.8	28.2	−5.0	5.29
1987	52,777,000	1,902,604	466,161	1,436,443	36.0	8.8	27.2	−3.9	5.18
1988	54,011,000	1,912,765	427,018	1,485,747	35.4	7.9	27.5	−4.7	4.4
1989	55,207,000	1,722,934	414,214	1,308,720	31.2	7.5	23.7	−2.0	
1990	51,911,000	1,687,000	393,250	1,293,750	32.5	7.6	24.9	−88.4	
1991	52,985,000	1,636,551	391,588	1,244,963	30.9	7.4	23.5	−3.2	4.1
1992	54,082,000	1,496,866	382,465	1,114,401	27.7	7.1	20.6	−0.3	
1993	55,201,000	1,600,549	380,000	1,220,549	29.0	6.9	22.1	−1.8	
1994	56,344,000	1,610,652	385,296	1,225,356	28.6	6.8	21.7	−1.4	
1995	57,642,000	1,604,835	384,548	1,220,287	27.8	6.7	21.2	1.3	3.6
1996	58,835,000	1,662,065	379,983	1,282,082	28.2	6.5	21.8	−1.5	
1997	60,053,000	1,654,695	389,301	1,265,394	27.6	6.5	21.1	−0.8	3.3
1998	61,296,000	1,687,252	399,772	1,287,480	27.5	6.5	21.0	−0.7	3.4
1999	62,565,000	1,693,025	401,433	1,291,592	27.1	6.4	20.6	−0.3	
2000	63,860,000	1,751,854	404,699	1,347,155	27.4	6.3	21.1	−0.8	3.5
2001	65,182,000	1,741,308	404,531	1,336,777	26.7	6.2	20.5	−0.2	
2002	66,628,000	1,766,589	424,034	1,342,555	26.5	6.4	20.2	1.5	
2003	67,965,000	1,777,418	440,149	1,337,269	26.2	6.5	19.7	0	3.2
2004	69,304,000	1,779,500	440,790	1,338,710	25.7	6.4	19.3	0	
2005	70,653,000	1,800,972	450,646	1,350,326	25.5	6.4	19.1	0	3.1
2006	72,009,000	1,853,746	451,863	1,401,883	25.7	6.3	19.5	−0.7	
2007	74,828,000	1,949,569	450,596	1,498,973	26.5	6.1	20.4	17.3	
2008	76,651,000	2,050,704	461,934	1,588,770	27.4	5.9	21.5	2.3	3.0
2009	78,522,000	2,217,409	476,592	1,740,817	28.8	6.2	22.6	1.2	
2010	80,443,000	2,261,409	483,385	1,778,024	28.7	6.1	22.6	1.3	
2011	82,410,000	2,442,094	493,086	1,949,008	30.3	6.1	24.2	−0.3	
2012	84,418,000	2,629,769	529,247	2,100,522	31.9	6.4	25.5	−1.7	
2013	86,460,000	2,621,902	511,000	2,110,719	31.0	6.0	25.0	−1.4	
2014	88,530,000	2,720,495	531,864	2,188,631	31.3	6.1	25.2	−1.8	3.5
2015	90,624,000	2,685,276	573,129	2,123,102	30.2	6.5	23.7	−0.6	3.4
2016	92,737,000	2,600,173	556,148	2,044,025	28.6	6.1	22.5	0.3	3.25
2017	95,203,000	2,557,400	547,200	1,971,115	26.8	5.6	21.2	4.7	3.12
2018	97,147,000	2,382,362	560,308	1,822,054	24.5	5.8	18.7	1.3	3.00
2019	98,902,000	2,304,800	570,600	1,734,200	23.3	5.8	17.5	0.2	3.01
2020	100,617,000	2,235,300	664,800	1,570,500	22.2	6.6	15.6	1.3	2.89
2021	102,061,000	2,184,605	741,900	1,442,705	21.4	7.3	14.1	0.2	2.80
2022	103,605,000	2,193,001	601,781	1,591,220	21.2	5.8	15.4	−0.5	2.76
2023	105,174,000	2,044,891	582,791	1,462,100	19.4	5.5	13.9	−5.8	2.54
2024	106,556,000	1,968,396	611,421	1,356,975	18.5	5.7	12.8	0.3	2.41
2025		1,944,700	610,600	1,334,100	18.1				2.34
2026									

=== Current vital statistics ===
Period	Live births	Deaths	Natural increase
January—September 2025	1,451,500	454,600	+996,900
January—September 2026	1,521,500	460,700	+1,060,800
Difference	▲ +70,000 (+4.82%)	▲ +6,100 (+1.34%)	▲ +63,900

=== Demographic and Health Surveys ===
Fertility rate (TFR) (wanted fertility rate) and CBR (crude birth rate):

Year	total		urban		rural	
Year	CBR	TFR	CBR	TFR	CBR	TFR
1992	29,7	3,93 (2,7)	23,3	2,92 (2,0)	35,0	4,91 (3,4)
1995	28,0	3,63 (2,6)	23,9	3,01 (2,2)	31,4	4,19 (2,9)
1997		3,3		2,7		3,7
1998	27	3,4	23	2,8	31	3,9
2000	27,8	3,53 (2,9)	24,8	3,09 (2,6)	30,1	3,88 (3,1)
2003	26,3	3,2 (2,5)	21,7	2,6 (2,1)	29,8	3,6 (2,9)
2005	27,1	3,1 (2,3)	23,6	2,7 (2,1)	29,6	3,4 (2,5)
2008	26,6	3,0 (2,4)	23,3	2,7 (2,2)	29,1	3,2 (2,5)
2014	29,1	3,5 (2,8)	23,3	2,9 (2,4)	32,7	3,8
2019		2,87				
2024		2,41				

=== Life expectancy ===
Life expectancy in Egypt since 1927

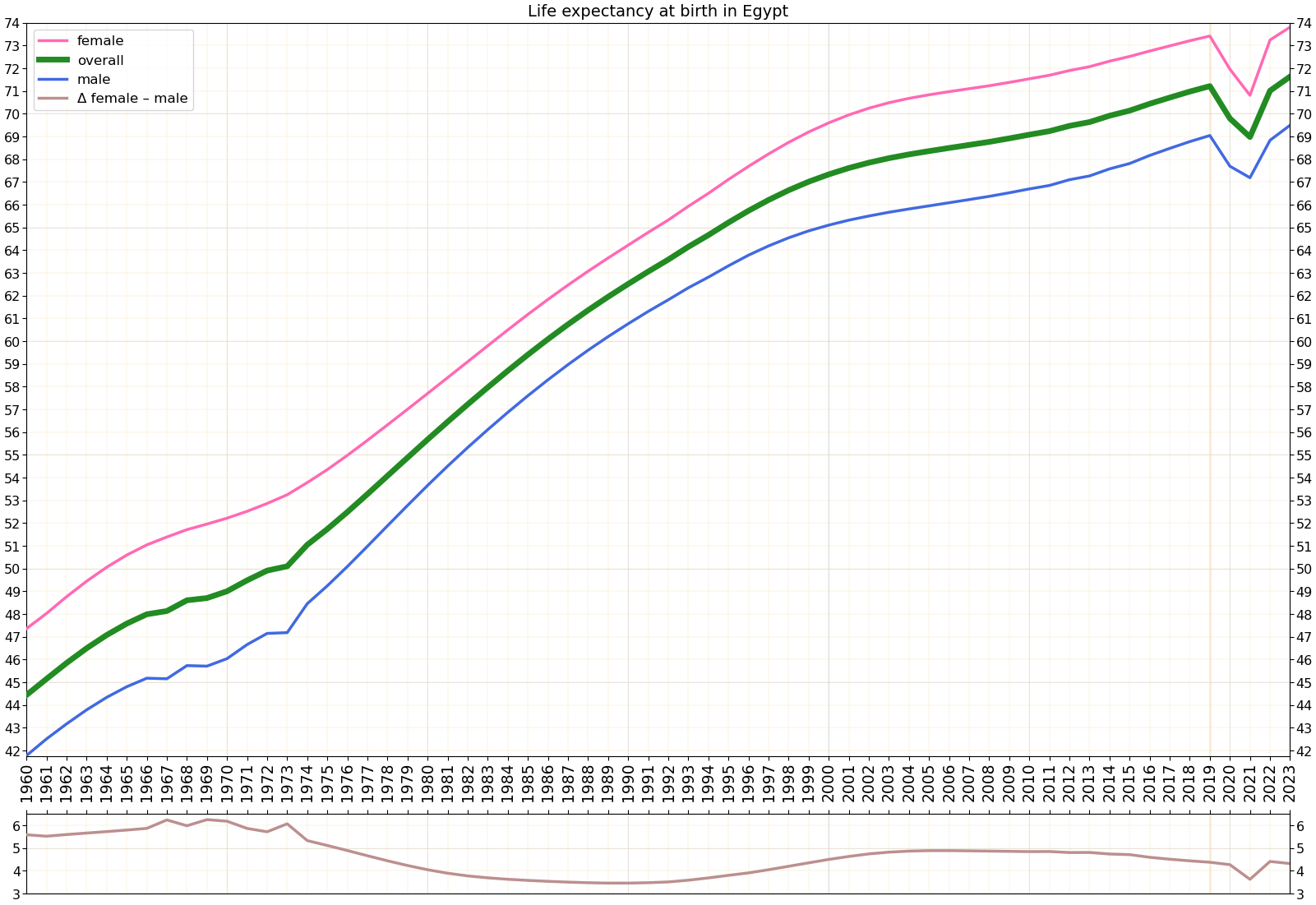
Life expectancy in Egypt since 1960 by gender

Average life expectancy at age 0 of the total population.

Period	Life expectancy in Years	Period	Life expectancy in Years
1950–1955	41.1	1985–1990	63.5
1955–1960	46.4	1990–1995	65.4
1960–1965	49.3	1995–2000	68.0
1965–1970	51.6	2000–2005	69.0
1970–1975	53.0	2005–2010	69.9
1975–1980	56.8	2010–2015	70.8
1980–1985	59.9		

== Demographics by Governorate ==
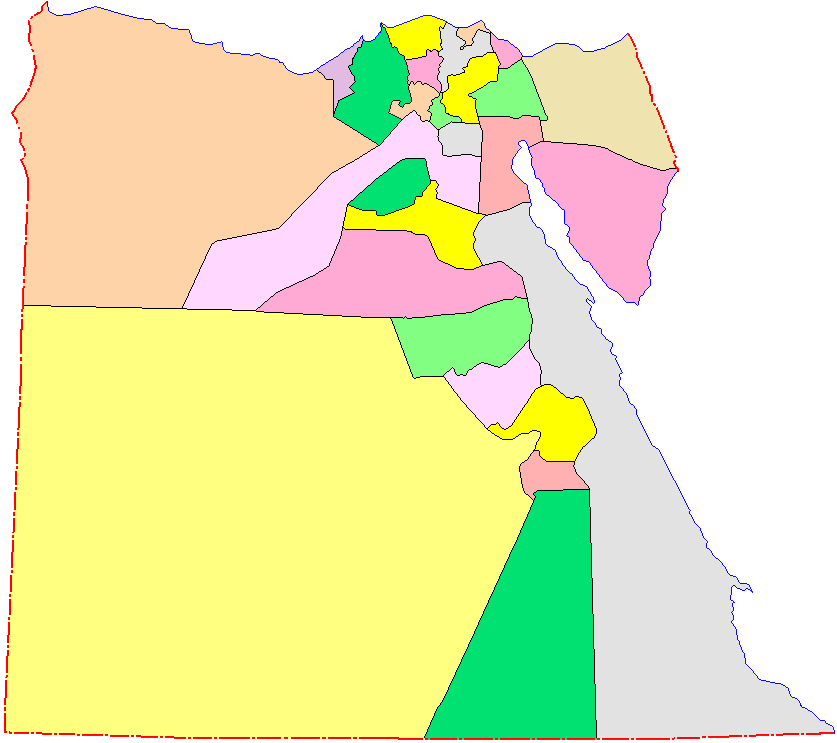

=== Urban and Rural Population of Governorates ===
Data taken from CAPMAS:

Governorate	% Urban	Population (2017)	Rural	Urban
Alexandria	98.7%	5,163,750	68,293	5,095,457
(Aswan Governorate) Aswan	41.1%	1,473,975	868,820	605,155
(Asyut Governorate) Asyut	25.9%	4,383,289	3,248,225	1,135,064
(Beheira Governorate) Beheira	18.2%	6,171,613	5,050,630	1,120,983
Beni Suef	20.1%	3,154,100	2,438,134	715,966
(Cairo Governorate) Cairo	100.0%	9,539,673	0	9,539,673
Dakahlia	28.3%	6,492,381	4,656,592	1,835,789
Damietta	39.4%	1,496,765	907,542	589,223
(Faiyum Governorate) Faiyum	23.0%	3,596,954	2,768,329	828,625
(Gharbia Governorate) Gharbia	28.1%	4,999,633	3,594,336	1,405,297
(Giza Governorate) Giza	61.1%	8,632,021	3,365,818	5,266,203
Ismailia	44.5%	1,303,993	724,046	579,947
Kafr el-Sheikh	23.9%	3,362,185	2,557,058	805,127
Luxor	40.4%	1,250,209	744,669	505,540
Matruh	62.7%	425,624	158,546	267,078
(Minya Governorate) Minya	18.0%	5,497,095	4,507,931	989,164
(Monufia Governorate) Monufia	20.7%	4,301,601	3,410,855	890,746
(New Valley Governorate) New Valley	46.0%	241,247	130,253	110,994
(North Sinai Governorate) North Sinai	62.9%	450,328	167,217	283,111
Port Said	100.0%	749,371	0	749,371
(Qalyubia Governorate) Qalyubia	42.7%	5,627,420	3,224,929	2,402,491
(Qena Governorate) Qena	18.8%	3,164,281	2,569,795	594,486
Red Sea	96.5%	359,888	12,516	347,372
Sharqia	24.9%	7,163,824	5,422,698	1,741,126
(Sohag Governorate) Sohag	21.2%	4,967,409	3,913,109	1,054,300
South Sinai	53.5%	102,018	48,079	53,939
Suez	100.0%	728,180	0	728,180
Total	42.2%	94,798,827	54,558,420	40,240,407

=== Population density by governorate ===
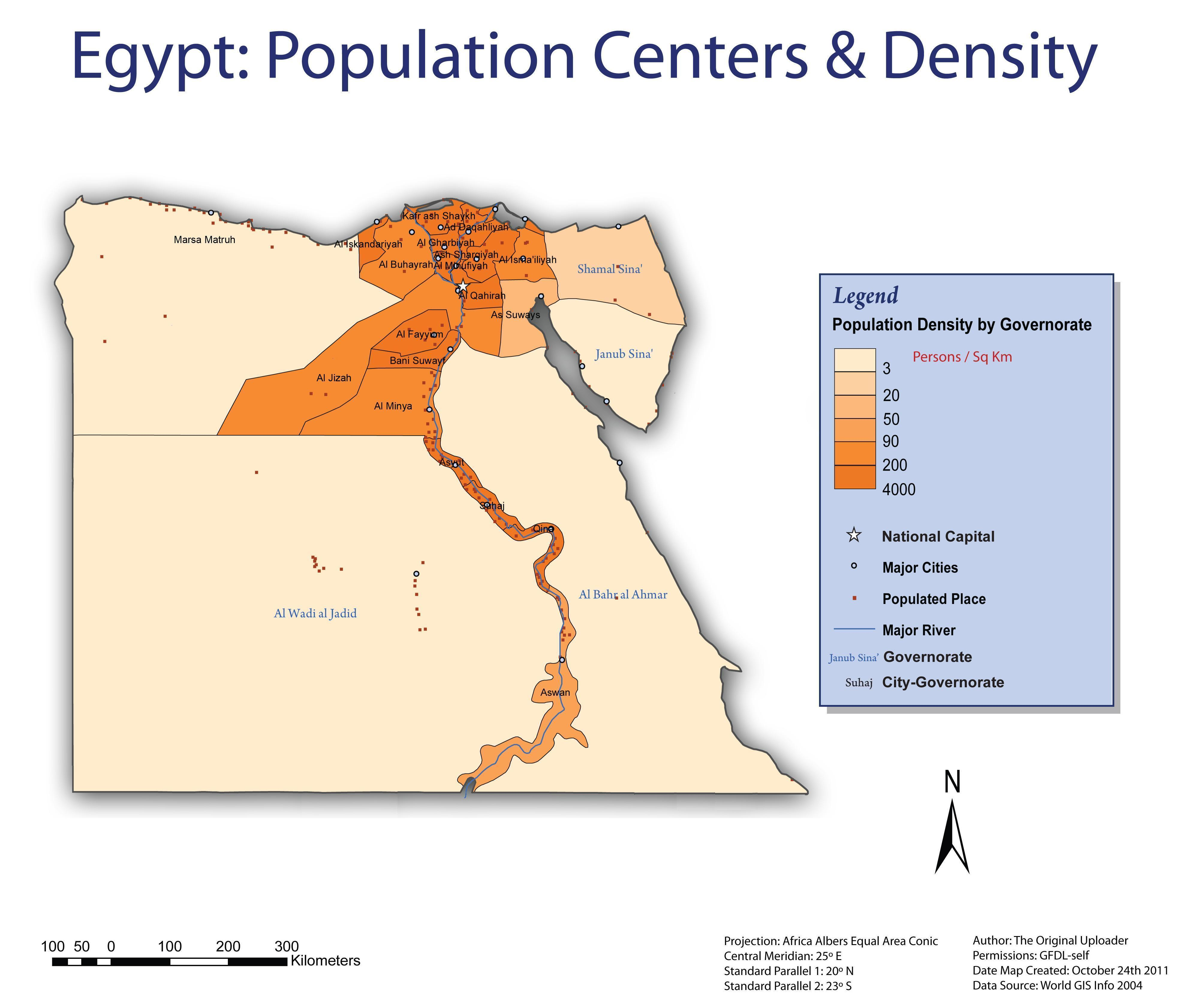
Egyptian Population Density in pre-2013 administrative divisions

As of 1 July 2014; data taken from CAPMAS: Information for population is in thousands, pop density – persons/km^{2} and area is in km^{2}.

Governorate	Population in thousands	Pop. density		% inhabited to total	Inhabited area	Total area
Governorate	Population in thousands	inhabited area	total area	% inhabited to total	Inhabited area	Total area
Alexandria	4,761	2,841.5	2,070.0	72.8%	1,675.50	2,300.00
(Aswan Governorate) Aswan	1,412	13,477.1	22.5	0.2%	104.77	62,726.00
(Asyut Governorate) Asyut	4,181	2,656.3	161.3	6.1%	1,574.00	25,926.00
(Beheira Governorate) Beheira	5,720	806.3	582.1	72.2%	7,093.84	9,826.00
Beni Suef	2,812	2,053.4	256.7	12.5%	1,369.41	10,954.00
(Cairo Governorate) Cairo	9,184	48,235.3	2,976.8	6.2%	190.40	3,085.12
Dakahlia	5,881	1,662.1	1,662.1	100.0%	3,538.23	3,538.23
Damietta	1,316	1,968.7	1,445.7	73.4%	668.47	910.26
(Faiyum Governorate) Faiyum	3,118	1,680.0	513.8	30.6%	1,856.00	6,068.00
(Gharbia Governorate) Gharbia	4,698	2,418.7	2,418.7	100.0%	1,942.34	1,942.34
(Giza Governorate) Giza	7,487	6,286.3	567.9	9.0%	1,191.00	13,184.00
Ismailia	1,162	229.3	229.3	100.0%	5,066.97	5,066.97
Kafr el-Sheikh	3,132	903.5	903.5	100.0%	3,466.69	3,466.69
Luxor	1,132	4,992.7	469.8	9.4%	226.73	2,409.68
Matruh	437	111.4	2.6	2.4%	3,921.40	166,563.00
(Minya Governorate) Minya	5,076	2,104.8	157.3	7.5%	2,411.65	32,279.00
(Monufia Governorate) Monufia	3,890	1,596.9	1,556.6	97.5%	2,435.93	2,499.00
(New Valley Governorate) New Valley	222	205.1	0.5	0.2%	1,082.24	440,098.00
(North Sinai Governorate) North Sinai	428	203.7	14.8	7.2%	2,100.84	28,992.00
Port Said	660	499.7	490.7	98.2%	1,320.68	1,344.96
(Qalyubia Governorate) Qalyubia	5,044	4,702.1	4,486.4	95.4%	1,072.72	1,124.28
(Qena Governorate) Qena	3,001	1,724.1	277.9	16.1%	1,740.63	10,798.00
Red Sea	341	4,794.0	2.9	0.1%	71.13	119,099.13
Sharqia	6,402	1,343.7	1,303.6	97.0%	4,764.28	4,911.00
(Sohag Governorate) Sohag	4,536	2,845.8	411.5	14.5%	1,593.92	11,022.00
South Sinai	166	9.9	5.3	53.7%	16,791.00	31,272.00
Suez	615	68.3	68.3	100.0%	9,002.21	9,002.21
Total	86,814	1109.1	85.9	7.8%	78272.98	1010407.87

== Ethnic groups ==
Ethnic groups of Egypt (2006)
Ethnic groups	percent
Egyptians	99.7%
Other	0.3%

The CIA World Factbook lists Egyptians as 99.7%, and "other" as 0.3% (2006 census). "Other" refers to people who are not citizens of Egypt, who come to Egypt to work for international companies, diplomats, etc.

The vast majority of the population of Egypt consists of Egyptians including Copts, the native Egyptians make up 95% of the population. The vast majority of Egyptians are speakers of the Egyptian Arabic dialect.

Minorities in Egypt include the Berber-speaking community of the Siwa Oasis (Siwis) and the Nubian people clustered along the Nile in the southernmost part of Egypt. There are also sizable minorities of Beja in the eastern desert and Dom.

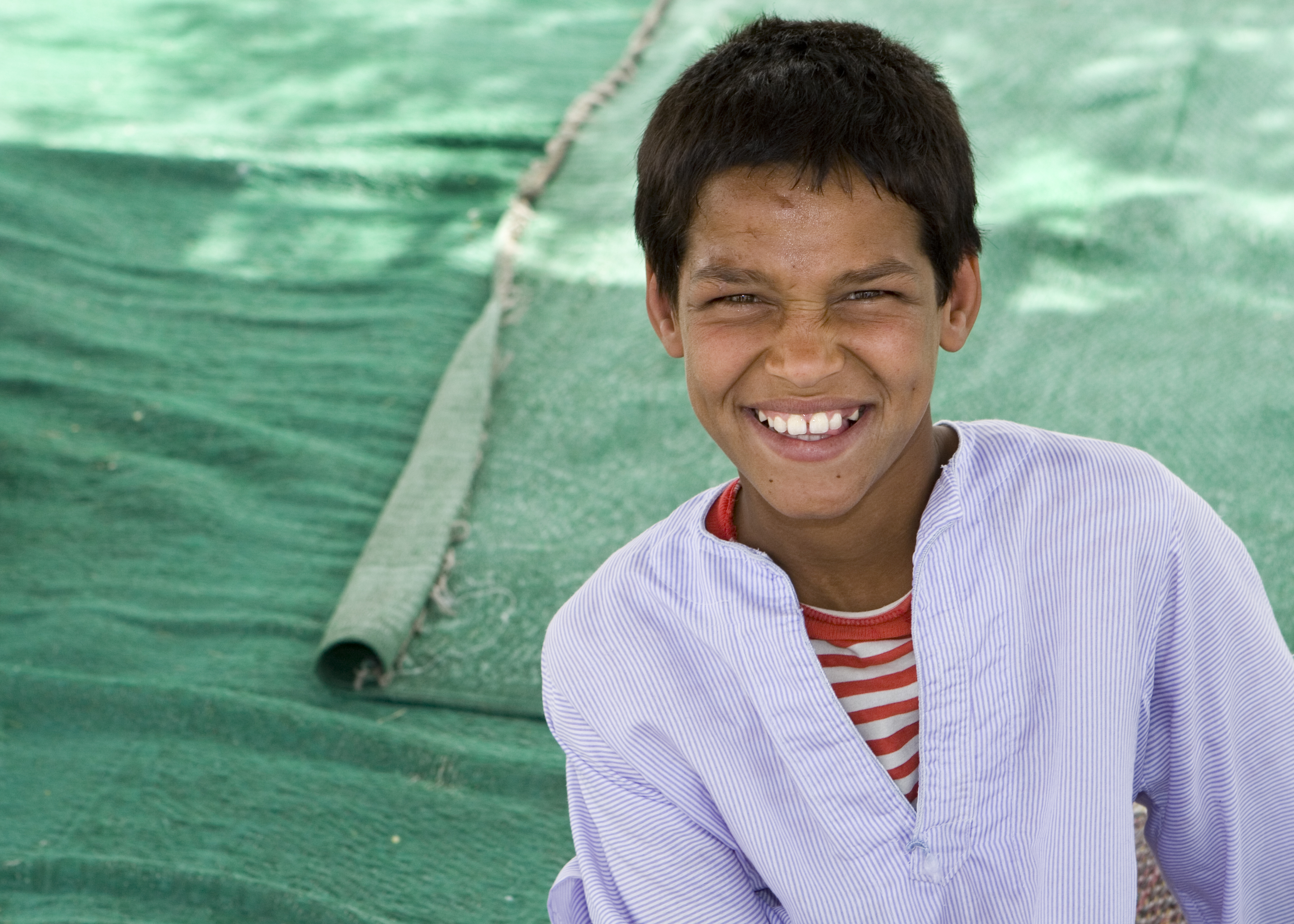
Sa'idi Upper Egyptian boy from the Luxor Governate

The country was also host to many different communities during the European occupation period, including Greeks, Italians, and also from war-torn areas; the Lebanese, Syro-Lebanese, and other minority groups like Jews, Armenians, Turks and Albanians, though most either left or were compelled to leave after political developments in the 1950s. The country still hosts some 90,000 refugees and asylum seekers, mostly Palestinians and Sudanese.

Other sources give more detailed statistics, including the Beja (ca. 88,000), the Nubians (ca. 1–3 million in 2026), Dom (ca. 230,000 in 1996), Berbers (Siwis) (ca. 30,000 in 2026).

In its latest assessment of migratory presences in Egypt, IOM has revealed that the current number of international migrants residing in Egypt is 9,012,582, equivalent to 8.7% of the Egyptian population. This migrant population is made up of people from 133 countries, among whom the largest groups are Sudanese (4 million), Syrians (1.5 million), Yemenis (1 million) and Libyans (1 million). These four nationalities make up 80% of the international migrants currently residing in the country. In 2023, EU's Josep Borrell, then the High Representative/Vice-President, estimated that refugees in Egypt make up 10% of the total population of the country.

== Languages ==
Arabic is the official language of Egypt, with the vast majority of Egyptians speaking Egyptian Arabic. In The Upper Nile valley regions, Sa'idi Arabic is prevalent. The Coptic language is still used in the Coptic church for the majority of prayers, hymns, masses, and meditations. English is widely understood. Siwa language is used in ethnic Berber tribal areas in the western desert (Siwa), and Nubian language is widely used among the ethnic Nubians in the southern areas.

== Religions ==
Religion in Egypt (est. 2017)
1. Islam (90.0%)
2. Christianity (10.0%)

According to the CIA World Factbook, 90% of the population is Muslim and 10% is Christian (majority Coptic Orthodox, other Christians include Armenian Apostolic, Catholic, Maronite, Orthodox, and Anglican). (Note: In 2017, the Wall Street Journal reported that "the vast majority of Egypt's estimated 9.5 million Christians, approximately 10% of the country's population, are Orthodox Copts." In 2019, the Associated Press cited an estimate of 10 million Copts in Egypt. In 2015, the Wall Street Journal reported: "The Egyptian government estimates about 5 million Copts, but the Coptic Orthodox Church says 15–18 million. Reliable numbers are hard to find but estimates suggest they make up somewhere between 6% and 18% of the population." In 2004, BBC News reported that Copts were 5–10% of the Egyptian population. The CIA World Factbook reported a 2015 estimate that 10% of the Egyptian population is Christian (including both Copts and non-Copts).)

- Muslim 90% (mostly Sunni)
- Christianity 10%
- Baháʼí: fewer than 2,000 individuals (< 0.003%)
- Judaism: ~12 individuals (mostly elderly people)

== Egyptians abroad ==
Egyptians have a long history of mobility, primarily across the Arab world, but emigration became much more popular once it was recognised as a right in the 1971 Constitution. According to the International Organization for Migration, an estimated 2.7 million Egyptians live abroad and contribute actively to the development of their country through remittances (US$7.8 billion in 2009), circulation of human and social capital, as well as investment. Approximately 70% of Egyptian migrants live in Arab countries (923,600 in Saudi Arabia, 332,600 in Libya, 226,850 in Jordan, 190,550 in Kuwait with the rest elsewhere in the region) and the remaining 30% are living mostly North America (318,000 in the United States, 110,000 in Canada) and Europe (90,000 in Italy).

== Genetics ==
=== Autosomal DNA ===
Almarri, Mohamed A et al. (2021) analyzed present-day Middle-Eastern groups. They modelled the components of a sample from Egypt as being made up of four ancient populations: 50% Natufian, 31% Iran Neolithic, 12% Mota, and 7% Eastern Hunter Gatherer.

=== mtDNA ===
Saunier, Jessica et al. (2009) sequenced mitogenomes from 277 unrelated Egyptian individuals. The results showed that 20.6% of the Egyptian mtDNA chromosomes were of Sub-Saharan African origin, while 79.4% were of West Eurasian.

=== Y-DNA ===
Listed here are some of the human Y-chromosome DNA haplogroups in Egypt, according to Bekada, Asmahan et al. (2013).

Haplogroup	n	A	B	E1a	E1b1a	E1b1b1	E1b1b1a	E1b1b1a1	E1b1b1a1b	E1b1b1a2	E1b1b1a3	E1b1b1a4	E1b1b1b	E1b1b1c	F	G	I	J1	J2	K	L	O	P, R	Q	R1a	R1b1a	R1b1b	R2	T
Marker				M33	M2	M35	M78	V12	V32	V13	V22	V65	M81	M34	M89	M201										V88	M269		M70
Egypt	370	1.35	–	0.54	2.43	3.24	0.81	7.03	1.62	0.81	9.19	2.43	11.89	6.76	1.08	5.68	0.54	20.81	6.75	0.27	0.81	0.27	0.54	0.27	2.16	2.97	2.97	0.54	6.22

== See also ==
- Health in Egypt
- List of cities in Egypt
- Population history of Egypt
