= Central Agency for Public Mobilization and Statistics =

Egypt's principal government institution in charge of statistics and census data

Arab Republic of Egypt Central Agency for Public Mobilization and Statistics
- الجهاز المركزى للتعبئة العامة والإحصاء
- Emblem of Egypt

Agency overview
- Jurisdiction: Government of Egypt
- Headquarters: Cairo (Egypt)
- Agency executive: Khirat Mohamed Barakat, Chairman
- Website: www.capmas.gov.eg

Central Agency for Public Mobilization and Statistics (CAPMAS; Arabic: الجهاز المركزي للتعبئة العامة والإحصاء) is the official statistical agency of Egypt that collects, processes, analyzes, and disseminates statistical data and conducts the census. CAPMAS was established by a Presidential Decree 2915 in 1964 and is the official provider of data, statistics, and reports.

CAPMAS functions support state planning, decision-making and policy assessment but it has been criticized for acting as an information regulator and for failing to provide access to researchers. Researchers must obtain a permit from CAPMAS prior to doing research in the country.

== History ==
A Freedom of Information Act was being considered in 2013 by the Parliament of Egypt, to help ensure high level of transparency and disclosure in line with international best practices but some doubted it would pass and as of 2016, there is no such law for Egypt.

The agency participated in World Statistics Day (in October 2015), with activities honoring senior statisticians, holding workshops, and with the launching of their new website.

== Population growth ==
One of the more important findings, by the agency, has been the type of population growth occurring in Egypt. Since 2014, Major General Abu Bakr al-Gendy, the head of CAPMAS, said that Egypt's population has been growing, for decades, at an unsustainable rate. He said the population grows at an alarming 1 million Egyptians every six months and called this type of growth "a virus" that must be addressed.

== See also ==
- Census in Egypt
- List of national and international statistical services
