= Little Egypt, Texas =

Community in Texas, US

Little Egypt was an African-American community in Texas which was founded after the Civil War and continued until the sale of the land in 1962. The roughly thirty-five acre neighborhood was located within Dallas city limits, north of Northwest Highway. Large homes and the Northlake Shopping Center currently occupy the site. Professors Clive Siegle and Tim Sullivan of Richland College led a project to discover what happened to the families after they left Little Egypt. Some of the original settlers were tracked to an neglected and vandalized cemetery in the area. The project also included an archeological survey of the only lot that had not been built over since the two houses that once there were bulldozed away. Siegle has found a few artifacts on the site.

== History ==
The land was originally deeded to newly freed slaves after the end of the Civil War. Jeff and Hanna Hill, the former slaves receiving the land, were released from chattel slavery when the Emancipation Proclamation was read out in Galveston on June 19, 1865. The community's name alludes to the Biblical story of the Exodus of Jews from Egypt where they had been slaves. The Little Egypt Baptist Church was built in 1870. The community's single school taught all grade levels. From early on, people in the community farmed as sharecroppers or worked on nearby plantations. The McCree Cemetery served the residents of Little Egypt.

As time went on and other neighborhoods got services like municipal or county services like running water, waste disposal systems, gas lines, paved roads and electricity, Little Egypt only got electricity. Rain could make the roads impassible, even though residents hauled discarded rocks in the attempt combat the mud. The church had no central heating or restrooms. Eventually, a wealthy white neighborhood surrounded Little Egypt and in November 1961, Little Egypt was rezoned for retail use.

In 1962, a consortium that wanted to build a shopping center on the land paid residents cash for their ramshackle homes. The group also paid for the residents' moving costs. Sarah Robinson, a trustee of the Little Egypt Baptist Church, advised residents to sell their homes in order to get a better deal than if they held on until they were forced out. The real estate deal took a year to finalize. All 200 residents moved away in a single day in 1962. Because race-based housing discrimination was still legal and barred them from moving to white neighborhoods, residents either moved to the nearby Cedar Crest neighborhood in Dallas, to Oak Cliff or into Rockwall County. Many residents apparently left eagerly because they were able to purchase modern homes with the money given them by the development group.
