= Lists of ecoregions =

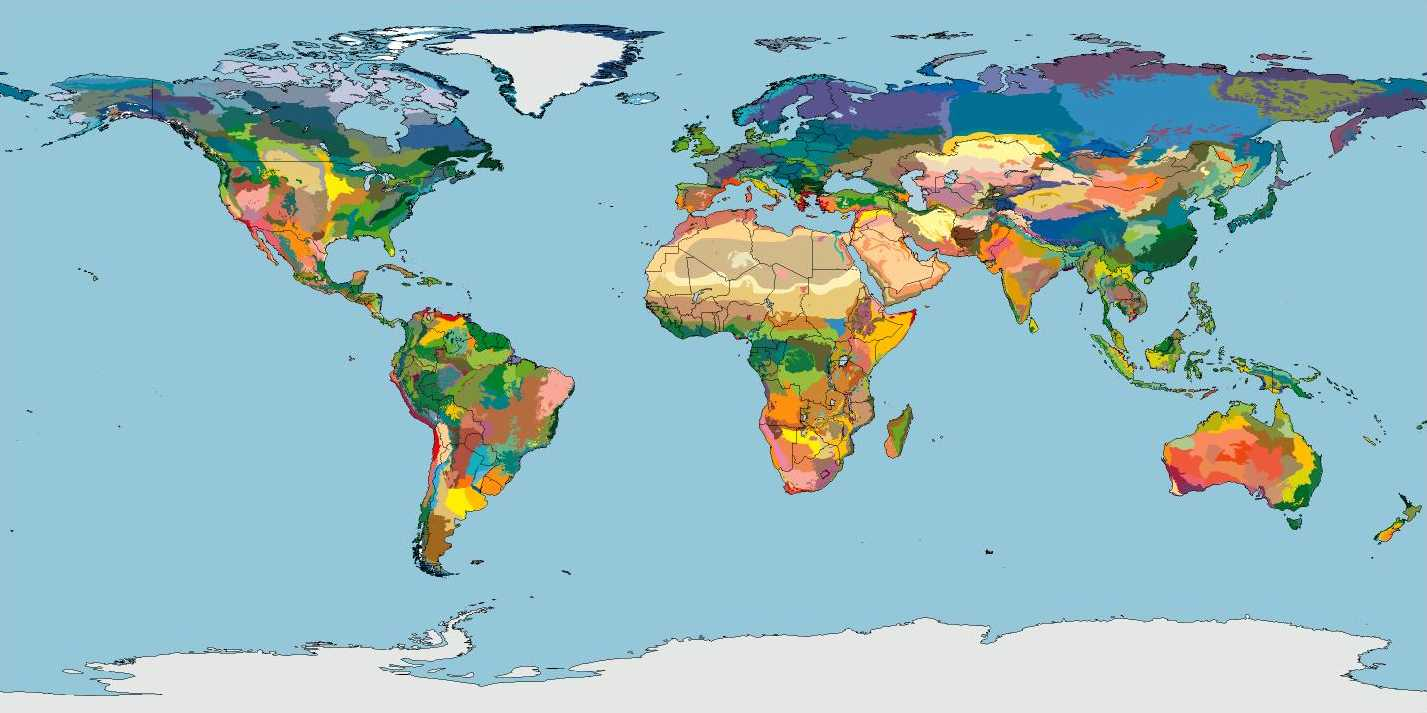
Terrestrial Ecoregions of the World (Olson et al. 2001, BioScience)

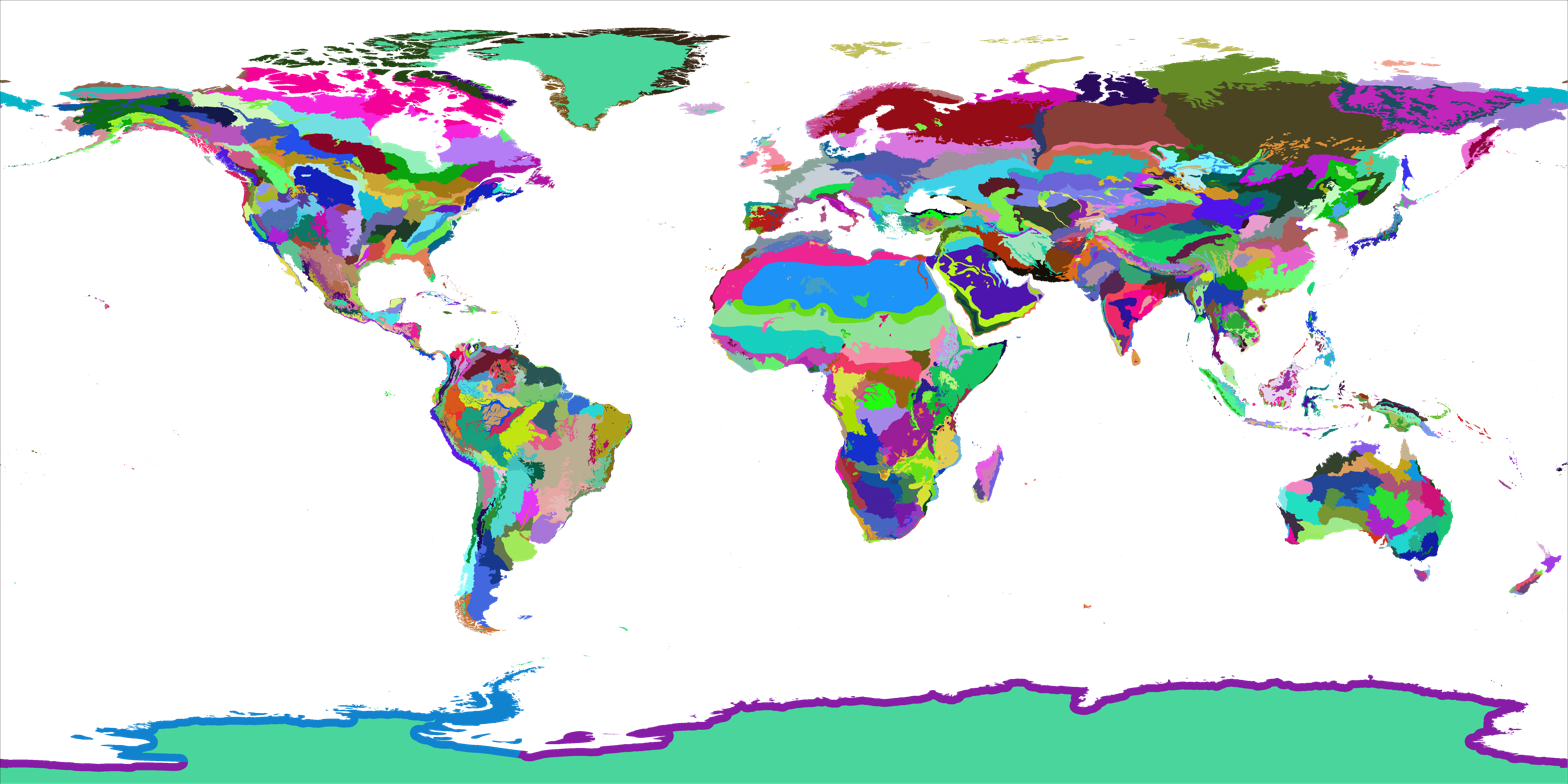
WWF terrestrial ecoregions of the world

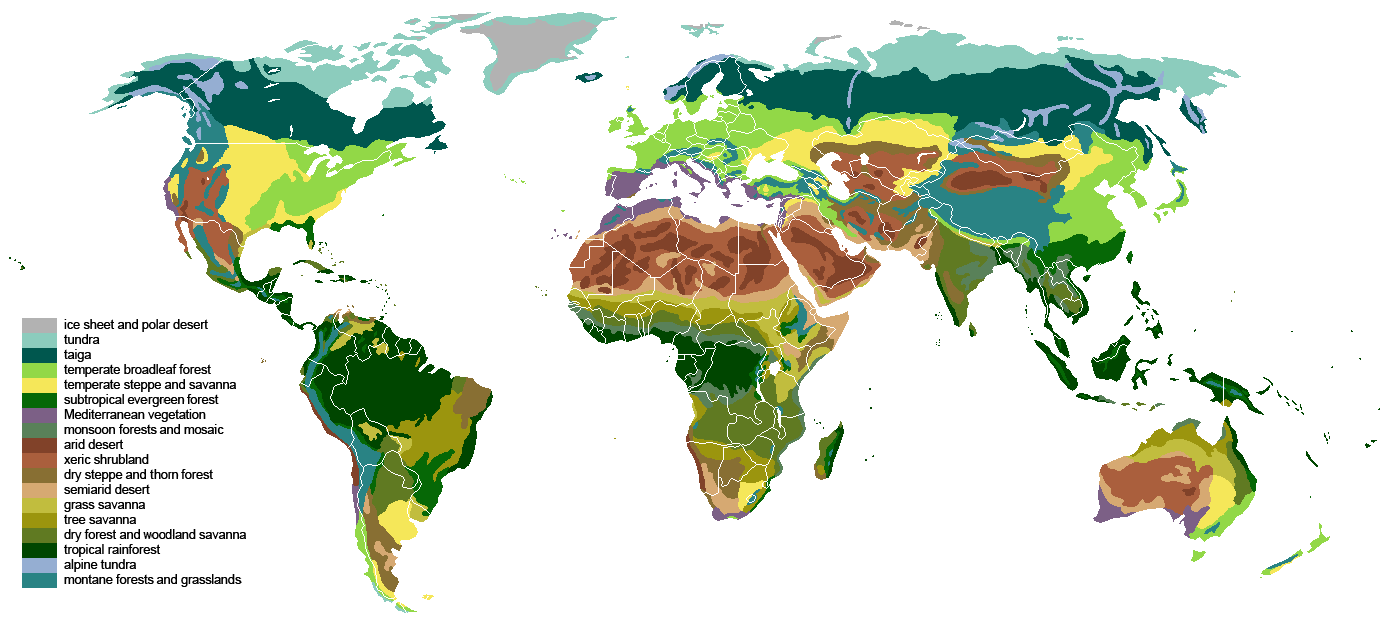
One way of mapping the world into 18 terrestrial vegetation biomes, each containing one or more ecoregions

There are articles relating to several ecoregion classification systems, defined by the conservation group World Wildlife Fund (WWF), the Commission for Environmental Cooperation (CEC), and like agencies around the world. The WWF uses three main classifications: Biogeographic realms (also called ecozones), biomes (also called major habitat types), and ecoregions.

- Global 200 ecoregions (WWF), 238 single or combined ecoregions identified by the World Wildlife Fund (WWF) as priorities for conservation.

== General list ==
- List of terrestrial ecoregions (WWF) 867 terrestrial ecoregions.
- List of marine ecoregions (WWF), 232 marine ecoregions of the coastal and continental shelf areas.
- List of freshwater ecoregions (WWF), 426 freshwater ecoregions.
- List of ecoregions by location
  - List of ecoregions in Australia
  - List of ecoregions in Canada (WWF)
  - List of ecoregions in Europe
  - List of ecoregions in Mexico
  - List of ecoregions in North America (CEC)
  - List of ecoregions in the United States (EPA)
  - List of ecoregions in the United States (WWF)

== By country ==
=== A ===
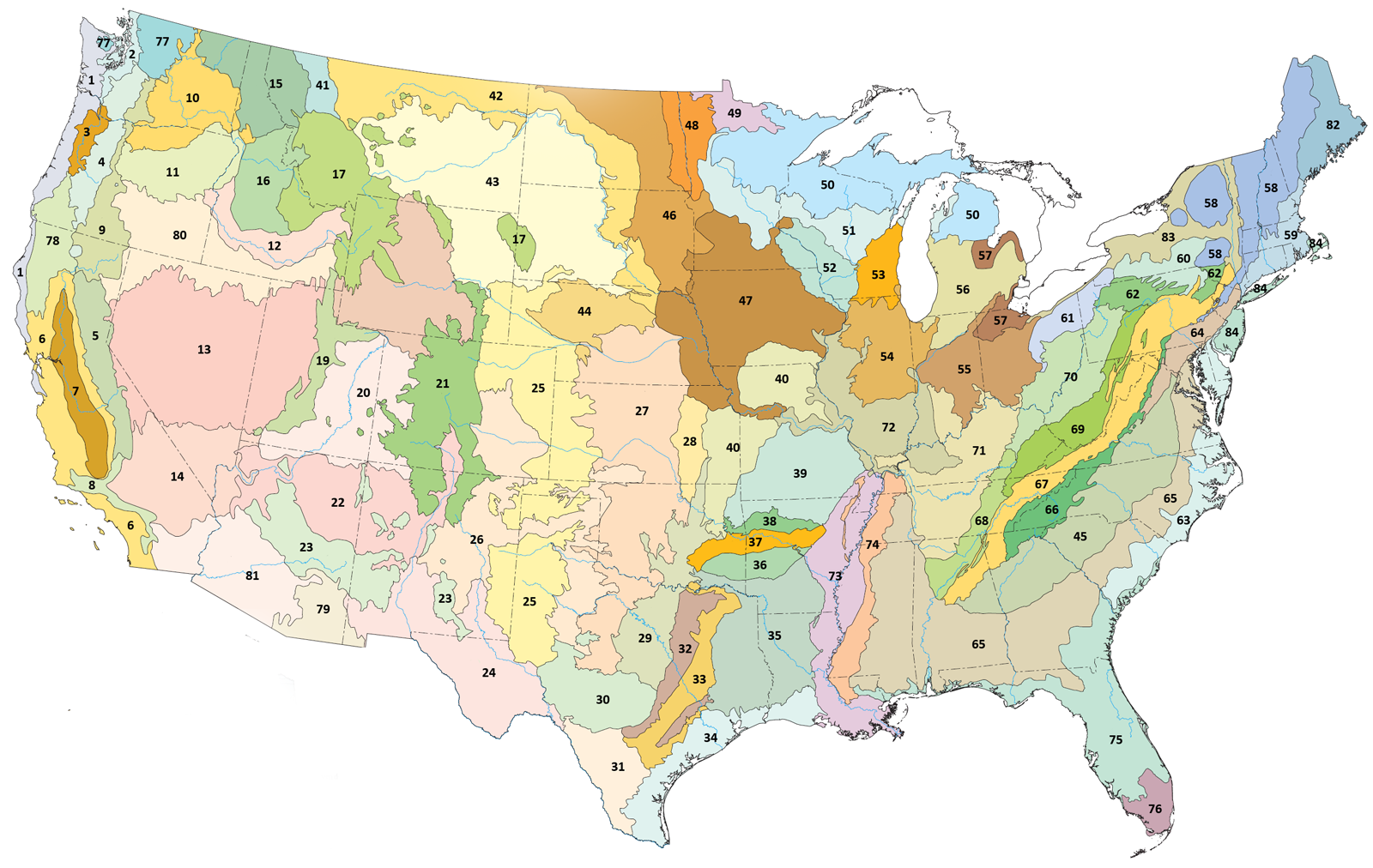
EPA level III ecoregions in the contiguous United States. Alaska ecoregions (102-120) not shown.

Ecoregions of North America, featuring Canada, Mexico, the United States

- List of ecoregions in Afghanistan
- List of ecoregions in Albania
- List of ecoregions in Algeria
- List of ecoregions in Angola
- List of ecoregions in Argentina
- List of ecoregions in Australia
- List of ecoregions in Austria
- List of ecoregions in Azerbaijan

=== B ===
- List of ecoregions in Bangladesh
- List of ecoregions in Belarus
- List of ecoregions in Belize
- List of ecoregions in Benin
- List of ecoregions in Bhutan
- List of ecoregions in Bolivia
- List of ecoregions in Bosnia and Herzegovina
- List of ecoregions in Botswana
- List of ecoregions in Brazil
- List of ecoregions in Bulgaria
- List of ecoregions in Burkina Faso
- List of ecoregions in Burundi

=== C ===
- List of ecoregions in Cambodia
- List of ecoregions in Cameroon
- List of ecoregions in Canada (WWF)
- Ecozones of Canada
- List of ecoregions in the Central African Republic
- List of ecoregions in Chad
- List of ecoregions in Chile
- List of ecoregions in China
- List of ecoregions in Colombia
- List of ecoregions in the Comoros
- List of ecoregions in the Democratic Republic of the Congo
- List of ecoregions in the Republic of the Congo
- List of ecoregions in the Cook Islands
- List of ecoregions in Costa Rica
- List of ecoregions in Croatia
- List of ecoregions in Cuba
- List of ecoregions in Cyprus
- List of ecoregions in Czech Republic

=== D ===
- List of ecoregions in Djibouti
- List of ecoregions in the Dominican Republic

=== E ===
- List of ecoregions in Ecuador
- List of ecoregions in Egypt
- List of ecoregions in El Salvador
- List of ecoregions in Equatorial Guinea
- List of ecoregions in Eritrea
- List of ecoregions in Eswatini
- List of ecoregions in Ethiopia

=== F ===
- List of ecoregions in France
- List of ecoregions in French Polynesia

=== G ===
- List of ecoregions in Gabon
- List of ecoregions in Gambia
- List of ecoregions in Germany
- List of ecoregions in Ghana
- List of ecoregions in Greece
- List of ecoregions in Guatemala
- List of ecoregions in Guinea
- List of ecoregions in Guinea-Bissau
- List of ecoregions in Guyana

=== H ===
- List of ecoregions in Haiti
- List of ecoregions in Honduras
- List of ecoregions in Hungary

=== I ===
- List of ecoregions in Iceland
- List of ecoregions in India
- List of ecoregions in Indonesia
- List of ecoregions in Iran
- List of ecoregions in Iraq
- List of ecoregions in Ireland
- List of ecoregions in Israel
- List of ecoregions in Italy
- List of ecoregions in Ivory Coast

=== J ===
- List of ecoregions in Japan
- List of ecoregions in Jordan

=== K ===
- List of ecoregions in Kazakhstan
- List of ecoregions in Kenya
- List of ecoregions in Kiribati

=== L ===
- List of ecoregions in Laos
- List of ecoregions in Lebanon
- List of ecoregions in Lesotho
- List of ecoregions in Liberia
- List of ecoregions in Libya

=== M ===
- List of ecoregions in Madagascar
- List of ecoregions in Malawi
- List of ecoregions in Malaysia
- List of ecoregions in Mali
- List of ecoregions in Mauritania
- List of ecoregions in Mauritius
- List of ecoregions in Mexico
- List of ecoregions in Mongolia
- List of ecoregions in Montenegro
- List of ecoregions in Morocco
- List of ecoregions in Mozambique
- List of ecoregions in Myanmar

=== N ===
- List of ecoregions in Namibia
- List of ecoregions in Nepal
- Ecoregions of New Zealand
- List of ecoregions in Nicaragua
- List of ecoregions in Niger
- List of ecoregions in Nigeria
- List of ecoregions in North Macedonia
- List of ecoregions in Norway

=== O ===
- List of ecoregions in Oman

=== P ===
- List of ecoregions in Pakistan
- List of ecoregions in Panama
- List of ecoregions in Papua New Guinea
- List of ecoregions in Paraguay
- List of ecoregions in Peru
- Ecoregions in the Philippines
- Ecoregions in Poland
- List of ecoregions in Portugal

=== R ===
- List of ecoregions in Romania
- List of ecoregions in Russia
- List of ecoregions in Rwanda

=== S ===
- List of ecoregions in Saudi Arabia
- List of ecoregions in Senegal
- List of ecoregions in Serbia
- List of ecoregions in Seychelles
- List of ecoregions in Sierra Leone
- List of ecoregions in Slovenia
- List of ecoregions in the Solomon Islands
- List of ecoregions in Somalia
- List of ecoregions in South Africa
- List of ecoregions in South Sudan
- List of ecoregions in Spain
- List of ecoregions in Sri Lanka
- List of ecoregions in Sudan
- List of ecoregions in Syria

=== T ===
- List of ecoregions in Tanzania
- List of ecoregions in Thailand
- List of ecoregions in Togo
- List of ecoregions in Tunisia
- List of ecoregions in Turkey
- List of ecoregions in Turkmenistan

=== U ===
- List of ecoregions in Uganda
- List of ecoregions in Ukraine
- List of ecoregions in the United Kingdom
- List of ecoregions in the United States:
  - Environmental Protection Agency version
  - World Wildlife Fund version
- List of ecoregions in Uzbekistan

=== V ===
- List of ecoregions in Venezuela
- List of ecoregions in Vietnam

=== W ===
- List of ecoregions in Western Sahara

=== Y ===
- List of ecoregions in Yemen

=== Z ===
- List of ecoregions in Zambia
- List of ecoregions in Zimbabwe

== See also ==
- List of biogeographic provinces
- List of ecosystems
