= List of ecoregions in Iraq =

This is a list of ecoregions in Iraq.

== Terrestrial ecoregions ==
Iraq is in the Palearctic realm. Ecoregions are listed by biome.

=== Temperate broadleaf and mixed forests ===
- Zagros Mountains forest steppe

=== Temperate grasslands, savannas, and shrublands ===
- Middle East steppe

=== Flooded grasslands and savannas ===
- Tigris-Euphrates alluvial salt marsh

=== Mediterranean forests, woodlands, and shrub ===
- Eastern Mediterranean conifer–sclerophyllous–broadleaf forests

=== Deserts and xeric shrublands ===
- Arabian Desert
- Mesopotamian shrub desert
- Persian Gulf desert and semi-desert
- South Iran Nubo-Sindian desert and semi-desert

== Freshwater ecoregions ==
- Arabian Interior
- Lower Tigris and Euphrates
- Upper Tigris and Euphrates

== Marine ecoregions ==
- Persian Gulf
