= List of ecoregions in Syria =

This is a list of ecoregions in Syria.

== Terrestrial ==
Syria is in the Palearctic realm. Ecoregions are listed by biome.

=== Mediterranean forests, woodlands, and scrub ===
- Eastern Mediterranean conifer-broadleaf forests
- Southern Anatolian montane conifer and deciduous forests

=== Deserts and xeric shrublands ===
- Middle East steppe
- Mesopotamian shrub desert

== Freshwater ==
- Arabian Interior
- Coastal Levant
- Jordan River
- Lower Tigris & Euphrates
- Orontes
- Upper Tigris & Euphrates

== Marine ==
- Levantine Sea, part of the Mediterranean Sea marine province in the Temperate Northern Atlantic marine realm
