= List of ecoregions in Israel =

This is a list of ecoregions in Israel.

== Terrestrial ==
Israel is in the Palearctic realm. Ecoregions are listed by biome.

=== Temperate grasslands, savannas, and shrublands ===
- Middle East steppe

=== Mediterranean forests, woodlands, and scrub ===
- Eastern Mediterranean conifer-broadleaf forests
- Southern Anatolian montane conifer and deciduous forests

=== Deserts and xeric shrublands ===
- Arabian desert
- Mesopotamian shrub desert
- Red Sea Nubo-Sindian tropical desert and semi-desert

== Freshwater ==
- Coastal Levant
- Jordan River
- Sinai

== Marine ==
- Levantine Sea, part of the Mediterranean Sea marine province in the Temperate Northern Atlantic marine realm
- Northern and Central Red Sea, part of the Red Sea and Gulf of Aden marine province in the Western Indo-Pacific marine realm.
