= List of ecoregions in Panama =

This is a list of ecoregions in Panama as defined by the World Wildlife Fund and the Freshwater Ecoregions of the World database.

== Tropical and subtropical moist broadleaf forests ==
- Chocó–Darién moist forests
- Eastern Panamanian montane forests
- Isthmian–Atlantic moist forests
- Isthmian–Pacific moist forests
- Talamancan montane forests

== Tropical and subtropical dry broadleaf forests ==
- Panamanian dry forests

== Mangroves ==
- Bocas del Toro–San Bastimentos Island–San Blas mangroves
- Gulf of Panama mangroves
- Moist Pacific Coast mangroves

== Freshwater ecoregions ==
=== Tropical and subtropical coastal rivers ===
- Chiriqui
- Isthmus Caribbean
- Santa Maria
- Chagres
- Rio Tuira

== Marine ecoregions ==
=== Tropical Northwestern Atlantic ===
- Southwestern Caribbean

=== Tropical East Pacific ===
- Nicoya
- Panama Bight
