= List of ecoregions in Croatia =

This is a list of ecoregions in Croatia.

== Terrestrial ==
Croatia is in the Palearctic realm. Ecoregions are listed by biome.

=== Mediterranean forests, woodlands, and scrub ===
- Illyrian deciduous forests
- Tyrrhenian-Adriatic sclerophyllous and mixed forests

=== Temperate broadleaf and mixed forests ===
- Dinaric Mountains mixed forests
- Pannonian mixed forests

== Freshwater ==
- Dalmatia
- Dniester - Lower Danube
- Upper Danube

== Marine ==
Croatia's coastline is in the Temperate Northern Atlantic marine realm, and the Mediterranean Sea marine province.

- Adriatic Sea
