= List of ecoregions in Bosnia and Herzegovina =

This is a list of ecoregions in Bosnia and Herzegovina.

== Terrestrial ==
Bosnia and Herzegovina is in the Palearctic realm. Ecoregions are listed by biome.

=== Mediterranean forests, woodlands, and scrub ===
- Illyrian deciduous forests

=== Temperate broadleaf and mixed forests ===
- Balkan mixed forests
- Dinaric Mountains mixed forests
- Pannonian mixed forests

== Freshwater ==
- Dalmatia
- Dniester - Lower Danube

== Marine ==
Bosnia and Herzegovina's short seashore is in the Temperate Northern Atlantic marine realm, and the Mediterranean Sea marine province.

- Adriatic Sea
