= List of ecoregions in Jordan =

The following is a list of ecoregions in Jordan defined by the World Wide Fund for Nature (WWF).

== Terrestrial ecoregions ==
Jordan is in the Palearctic realm. Ecoregions are listed by biome.

=== Temperate grasslands, savannas, and shrublands ===
- Middle East steppe

=== Mediterranean forests, woodlands, and scrub ===
- Eastern Mediterranean conifer-sclerophyllous-broadleaf forests

=== Deserts and xeric shrublands ===
- Arabian Desert
- Mesopotamian shrub desert
- Red Sea Nubo-Sindian tropical desert and semi-desert

== Freshwater ecoregions ==
- Jordan River
- Arabian Interior
- Southwestern Arabian Coast

== Marine ecoregions ==
- Northern and Central Red Sea
