= List of ecoregions in Colombia =

The following is a list of ecoregions in Colombia defined by the World Wide Fund for Nature (WWF).

Colombia is considered one of the world's 'megadiverse' countries, and is home to one in ten of the world's plant and animal species. It is ranked first in bird and orchid species diversity, and second in plants, butterflies, freshwater fishes and amphibians. Colombia's location in the tropics and its varied topography create a diverse range of habitats, including tropical rain forests, deserts, high mountains, coral reefs, and mangroves.

== Terrestrial ==
Colombia is in the Neotropical realm. Ecoregions are listed by biome.

=== Tropical and subtropical moist broadleaf forests ===
- Caquetá moist forests
- Cauca Valley montane forests
- Cayos Miskitos–San Andrés and Providencia moist forests
- Chocó–Darién moist forests
- Cordillera Oriental montane forests
- Eastern Cordillera Real montane forests
- Eastern Panamanian montane forests
- Guayanan Highlands moist forests
- Japurá–Solimões–Negro moist forests
- Magdalena Valley montane forests
- Magdalena–Urabá moist forests
- Napo moist forests
- Negro–Branco moist forests
- Northwestern Andean montane forests
- Rio Negro campinarana
- Santa Marta montane forests
- Solimões–Japurá moist forests
- Venezuelan Andes montane forests
- Western Ecuador moist forests

=== Tropical and subtropical dry broadleaf forests ===
- Apure–Villavicencio dry forests
- Cauca Valley dry forests
- Patía Valley dry forests
- Sinú Valley dry forests

=== Tropical and subtropical grasslands, savannas, and shrublands ===
- Llanos

=== Montane grasslands and shrublands ===
- Northern Andean páramo
- Santa Marta páramo

=== Deserts and xeric shrublands ===
- Guajira–Barranquilla xeric scrub
- Malpelo Island xeric scrub

=== Mangroves ===
- Esmeraldas–Pacific Colombia mangroves
- Magdalena–Santa Marta mangroves
- Gulf of Panama mangroves

== Marine ==
=== Tropical Atlantic ===
Colombia's Atlantic coast marine ecoregions are in the Caribbean Sea marine province.

- Southern Caribbean
- Southwestern Caribbean

=== Tropical Eastern Pacific ===
- Panama Bight
