= List of ecoregions in Ecuador =

This is a list of ecoregions in Ecuador.

== Terrestrial ==
Ecuador is in the Neotropical realm. Ecoregions are listed by biome.

=== Tropical and subtropical moist broadleaf forests ===
- Chocó–Darién moist forests
- Eastern Cordillera Real montane forests
- Napo moist forests
- Northwestern Andean montane forests
- Western Ecuador moist forests

=== Tropical and subtropical dry broadleaf forests ===
- Ecuadorian dry forests
- Tumbes–Piura dry forests

=== Flooded grasslands and savannas ===
- Guayaquil flooded grasslands

=== Montane grasslands and shrublands ===
- Cordillera Central páramo
- Northern Andean páramo

=== Deserts and xeric shrublands ===
- Galápagos Islands xeric scrub

=== Mangroves ===
- Esmeraldas–Pacific Colombia mangroves
- Gulf of Guayaquil–Tumbes mangroves
- Manabí mangroves

== Marine ==
=== Tropical Eastern Pacific ===
- Galapagos
- Guayaquil
- Panama Bight
