= List of ecoregions in Slovenia =

The following is a list of ecoregions in Slovenia as identified by the World Wide Fund for Nature (WWF).

== Terrestrial ==
Slovenia is in the Palearctic realm. Ecoregions are listed by biome.

=== Mediterranean forests, woodlands, and scrub ===
- Illyrian deciduous forests

=== Temperate broadleaf and mixed forests ===
- Dinaric Mountains mixed forests
- Pannonian mixed forests

=== Temperate coniferous forests ===
- Alps conifer and mixed forests

== Freshwater ==
- Dalmatia
- Dniester - Lower Danube
- Gulf of Venice drainages
- Upper Danube

== Marine ==
Slovenia's coastline is in the Temperate Northern Atlantic marine realm, and the Mediterranean Sea marine province.

- Adriatic Sea
