= List of ecoregions in Iran =

The following is a list of ecoregions in Iran as identified by the World Wide Fund for Nature (WWF).

== Terrestrial ecoregions ==
Iran is in the Palearctic realm. Ecoregions are listed by biome.

=== Temperate broadleaf and mixed forests ===
- Caspian Hyrcanian mixed forests
- Zagros Mountains forest steppe
- Caucasus mixed forest

=== Temperate coniferous forests ===
- Elburz Range forest steppe

=== Temperate grasslands, savannas, and shrublands ===
- Eastern Anatolian montane steppe
- Middle East steppe

=== Flooded grasslands and savannas ===
- Tigris-Euphrates alluvial salt marsh

=== Montane grasslands and shrublands ===
- Kopet Dag woodlands and forest steppe
- Kuh Rud and Eastern Iran montane woodlands

=== Deserts and xeric shrublands ===
- Arabian desert
- Azerbaijan shrub desert and steppe
- Badghyz and Karabil semi-desert
- Baluchistan xeric woodlands
- Caspian lowland desert
- Central Persian desert basins
- Kopet Dag semi-desert
- Mesopotamian shrub desert
- Registan–North Pakistan sandy desert
- South Iran Nubo-Sindian desert and semi-desert

== Freshwater ecoregions ==
- Baluchistan
- Caspian Highlands
- Esfahan
- Helmand-Sistan
- Kavir and Lut Deserts
- Kura-South Caspian Drainages
- Namak
- Northern Hormuz Drainages
- Orumiyeh
- Lower Tigris and Euphrates
- Upper Tigris and Euphrates
- Turan Plain
- Upper Amu Darya
