= List of ecoregions in French Polynesia =

The following is a list of ecoregions in French Polynesia, according to the Worldwide Fund for Nature (WWF).

== Terrestrial ==
French Polynesia is in the Oceanian realm

=== Tropical and subtropical moist broadleaf forests ===
- Marquesas tropical moist forests
- Society Islands tropical moist forests
- Tuamotu tropical moist forests
- Tubuai tropical moist forests

== Freshwater ==
- Marquesas
- Society Islands
- Tubuai Islands

== Marine ==
French Polynesia is in the Eastern Indo-Pacific marine realm.

=== Southeast Polynesia province ===
- Tuamotus
- Rapa-Pitcairn
- Southern Cook/Austral Islands
- Society Islands

=== Marquesas province ===
- Marquesas
