= List of ecoregions in Germany =

The following is a list of ecoregions in Germany defined by the World Wide Fund for Nature (WWF).

== Terrestrial ==
Germany is in the Palearctic realm. Ecoregions are listed by biome.

=== Temperate broadleaf and mixed forests ===
- Baltic mixed forests
- European Atlantic mixed forests
- Central European mixed forests
- Western European broadleaf forests

=== Temperate coniferous forests ===
- Alps conifer and mixed forests

== Freshwater ==
- Central & Western Europe
- Upper Danube

== Marine ==
Germany's seacoast is in the Temperate Northern Atlantic marine realm, and the Northern European Seas marine province.

- Baltic Sea
- North Sea
