= List of ecoregions in Lebanon =

The following is a list of ecoregions in Lebanon as identified by the World Wide Fund for Nature (WWF).

== Terrestrial ==
Lebanon is in the Palearctic realm. Its ecoregions are in the Mediterranean forests, woodlands, and scrub biome.

- Eastern Mediterranean conifer-sclerophyllous-broadleaf forests (also known as the Eastern Mediterranean conifer-broadleaf forests)
- Southern Anatolian montane conifer and deciduous forests

== Freshwater ==
- Coastal Levant
- Jordan River

== Marine ==
- Levantine Sea, part of the Mediterranean Sea marine province in the Temperate Northern Atlantic marine realm
