= List of ecoregions in the Czech Republic =

According to the World Wide Fund for Nature, the territory of the Czech Republic can be subdivided into four terrestrial ecoregions:

- Central European mixed forests
- Pannonian mixed forests
- Western European broadleaf forests
- Carpathian montane conifer forests
