= List of ecoregions in Kiribati =

This is a list of ecoregions in Kiribati.

== Terrestrial ==
- Central Polynesian tropical moist forests
- Eastern Micronesia tropical moist forests
- Western Polynesian tropical moist forests

== Marine ==
- Eastern Indo-Pacific realm
  - Marshall, Gilbert, and Ellice Islands province
    - Gilbert and Ellice Islands
  - Central Polynesia province
    - Line Islands
    - Phoenix Islands/Tokelau/Northern Cook Islands
