= List of ecoregions in Peru =

This is a list of ecoregions in Peru.

== Terrestrial ==
Peru is in the Neotropical realm. Ecoregions are listed by biome.

=== Tropical and subtropical moist broadleaf forests ===
- Bolivian Yungas
- Eastern Cordillera Real montane forests
- Iquitos várzea
- Napo moist forests
- Peruvian Yungas
- Solimões–Japurá moist forests
- Southwest Amazon moist forests
- Ucayali moist forests

=== Tropical and subtropical dry broadleaf forests ===
- Marañón dry forests
- Tumbes–Piura dry forests

=== Montane grasslands and shrublands ===
- Central Andean dry puna
- Central Andean puna
- Central Andean wet puna
- Cordillera Central páramo

=== Deserts and xeric shrublands ===
- Atacama Desert
- Sechura Desert

=== Mangroves ===
- Gulf of Guayaquil–Tumbes mangroves
- Piura mangroves

== Marine ==
Peru is at the intersection of two marine realms, Temperate South America and the Tropical Eastern Pacific.

=== Temperate South America ===
- Central Peru
- Humboldtian

=== Tropical Eastern Pacific ===
- Guayaquil
