= List of ecoregions in Ireland =

The following is a list of ecoregions in Ireland as identified by the World Wide Fund for Nature (WWF).

== Terrestrial ecoregions ==
listed by realm, then by biome:

=== Palearctic realm ===
==== Temperate broadleaf and mixed forests ====
- Celtic broadleaf forests
- North Atlantic moist mixed forests

== Freshwater ecoregions ==
- Northern British Isles

== Marine ecoregions ==
listed by marine realm, then marine province:

=== Temperate Northern Atlantic realm ===
==== Northern European Seas province ====
- Celtic Seas
