= List of ecoregions in Saudi Arabia =

The following is a list of ecoregions in Saudi Arabia, as identified by the Worldwide Fund for Nature (WWF).

== Terrestrial ecoregions ==
Yemen lies on the boundary between two of the world's biogeographic realms. The Afrotropical realm covers the southeastern portion of the Arabian Peninsula, as well as Sub-Saharan Africa and Madagascar. The Palearctic realm covers the rest of the Arabian Peninsula as well as temperate Eurasia and Northern Africa.

=== Mediterranean forests, woodlands, and scrub ===
- Eastern Mediterranean conifer-broadleaf forests(Al-baha and Taif)

=== Deserts and xeric shrublands ===
- Arabian desert (Palearctic)
- Persian Gulf desert and semi-desert (Palearctic)
- Red Sea Nubo-Sindian tropical desert and semi-desert (Palearctic)
- Southwestern Arabian montane woodlands (palearctic)
- Southwestern Arabian foothills savanna (Afrotropical)
- Arabian Peninsula coastal fog desert (Afrotropical)

== Freshwater ecoregions ==
- Arabian Interior
- Southwestern Arabian Coast

== Marine ecoregions ==
Saudi Arabia's seas are divided into three marine ecoregions, all part of the Western Indo-Pacific marine realm.

- Persian Gulf
- Northern and Central Red Sea
- Southern Red Sea
