= List of ecoregions in Austria =

This is a list of ecoregions in Austria as defined by the World Wildlife Fund and the Freshwater Ecoregions of the World database.

Austria is made up of four terrestrial ecoregions and two freshwater ecoregions. Austria's ecology is largely influenced by the Alps and the water which flows from them. The central western part of Austria is home to these mountains, and the eastern and northern portions of the nation are less extreme in their elevations. The country is home to diverse terrestrial and marine fauna. These ecoregions are descriptions of the areas in their natural state; many are home to farms and urban populations.

== Terrestrial ==
Alps conifer and mixed forests

Central European mixed forests

Western European broadleaf forests

Pannonian mixed forests

Austria is part of the Palearctic realm, one of the eight biogeographic realms that cover the Earth's land surface. By Köppen climate classification, the flatter parts of eastern Austria has a warm temperate humid climate (Cfb), the west and central foothills have a humid snow climate (Dfb), and the mountainous areas are classified as subarctic (Dfc), tundra (ET), or ice-cap (EF). The following are the four terrestrial ecoregions of Austria:

- The cold and high elevation Alps conifer and mixed forests (PA0501) ecoregion which makes up most of western Austria is made of deep valleys covered with oak trees; an outer mountainous area with beech, fir, spruce, and pine; and an interior with larch and pine trees. It is a biodiverse region with many vascular plants, large and small mammals, birds, and herptiles.
- A slice of north eastern Austria is part of the Central European mixed forests (PA0412) ecoregion. This area is naturally flat and forested or marshy (though most marshes have been drained). It is notably home to some at risk species including lynx, european bison, black grouse, white-tailed eagle, and the greater spotted eagle, among many other species.
- Much of north Austria belongs to the Western European broadleaf forests (PA0445) ecoregion. This region is defined by its hilly lands and beech forests. Various animals including wild boar, deer, wolf, and many types of birds live in this habitat.
- Pannonian mixed forests (PA0431) make up the easternmost area of Austria. This region is the depression surrounded by the Carpathian, Alps, and Dinaric Mountain ranges. It is made of mostly oak forests. Wolves, european rabbits, the endangered European mink, and various reptiles occupy this region.

== Freshwater ==
Map of Austrian rivers and basins

Austria has two freshwater ecoregions. Much of Austria's freshwater has its origins from the Alps.

- Almost all of Austria lies within the Upper Danube (417) freshwater ecoregion, which is made of various rivers flowing through valleys and many lakes. The Danube, and hence water from this area drains to the Black Sea. Within this ecoregion in Austria, there are many alpine and subalpine lake, including Lake Attersee and Lake Traunsee. Many salmonid fish along with some pikes, sanders, aps, tenchs, and catfish are native to this region. Carps have been introduced by humans.
- The far west of its panhandle belongs to the drainage basin of the Rhine and a sliver of north central Austria belongs to that of the Elbe are part of the Central and Western Europe (404) freshwater ecoregion. This area ultimately drains to the North Sea. Various species of whitefish can be found in this region, notably in Lake Constance on Austria's western border.
  Largest lakes of Austria
