= List of ecoregions in Hungary =

The following is a list of ecoregions in Hungary as identified by the World Wide Fund for Nature (WWF).

== Terrestrial ==
Hungary is in the Palearctic realm. The country lies within one terrestrial ecoregion:

- Pannonian mixed forests.

== Freshwater ==
According to the Freshwater Ecoregions Of the World Hungary is covered by the following ecoregions:

- Upper Danube ecoregion
- Dniester-Lower Danube ecoregion
