= List of ecoregions in Seychelles =

The following is a list of ecoregions in the Seychelles, as identified by the Worldwide Fund for Nature (WWF).

== Terrestrial ecoregions ==
by major habitat type

=== Tropical and subtropical moist broadleaf forests ===
- Granitic Seychelles forests

=== Deserts and xeric shrublands ===
- Aldabra Island xeric scrub

== Freshwater ecoregions ==
by bioregion

=== Madagascar and the Indian Ocean Islands ===
- Coralline Seychelles
- Granitic Seychelles

== Marine ecoregions ==
- Seychelles
