= List of ecoregions in Bolivia =

This is a list of ecoregions in Bolivia.

== Terrestrial ==
Bolivia is in the Neotropical realm. Ecoregions are listed by biome.

=== Tropical and subtropical moist broadleaf forests ===
- Madeira-Tapajós moist forests
- Bolivian Yungas
- Southern Andean Yungas
- Southwest Amazon moist forests

=== Tropical and subtropical dry broadleaf forests ===
- Bolivian montane dry forests
- Chaco
- Chiquitano dry forests

=== Tropical and subtropical grasslands, savannas, and shrublands ===
- Beni savanna
- Cerrado

=== Flooded grasslands and savannas ===
- Pantanal

=== Montane grasslands and shrublands ===
- Central Andean dry puna
- Central Andean puna
- Central Andean wet puna
