= List of ecoregions in Sierra Leone =

The following is a list of ecoregions in Sierra Leone, according to the Worldwide Fund for Nature (WWF).

== Terrestrial ecoregions ==
By major habitat type:

=== Tropical and subtropical moist broadleaf forests ===
- Guinean montane forests
- Western Guinean lowland forests

=== Tropical and subtropical grasslands, savannas, and shrublands ===
- Guinean forest-savanna mosaic

=== Mangrove ===
- Guinean mangroves

== Freshwater ecoregions ==
By bioregion:

=== Upper Guinea ===
- Northern Upper Guinea
