= List of ecoregions in North Macedonia =

The following is a list of ecoregions in North Macedonia as identified by the World Wide Fund for Nature (WWF).

== Terrestrial ecoregions ==
North Macedonia is in the Palearctic realm. Ecoregions are listed by biome.

=== Mediterranean forests, woodlands, and scrub ===
- Aegean and Western Turkey sclerophyllous and mixed forests
- Pindus Mountains mixed forests

=== Temperate broadleaf and mixed forests ===
- Balkan mixed forests
- Rodope montane mixed forests

== Freshwater ecoregions ==
- Southeast Adriatic drainages
- Thrace
- Vardar
