= List of ecoregions in Bangladesh =

This is a list of ecoregions in Bangladesh.

== Terrestrial ==
Bangladesh is in the Indomalayan realm. Ecoregions are listed by biome.

=== Tropical and subtropical moist broadleaf forests ===
- Brahmaputra Valley semi-evergreen forests
- Lower Gangetic Plains moist deciduous forests
- Meghalaya subtropical forests
- Mizoram–Manipur–Kachin rain forests
- Sundarbans freshwater swamp forests

=== Mangroves ===
- Myanmar Coast mangroves
- Sundarbans mangroves

== Freshwater ==
=== Tropical and subtropical floodplain rivers and wetland complexes ===
- Ganges Delta and Plain

=== Tropical and subtropical coastal rivers ===
- Chin Hills - Arakan Coast

== Marine ==
Bangladesh's coastal waters are in the Western Indo-Pacific marine realm.

- Northern Bay of Bengal
