= List of ecoregions in South Sudan =

The following is a list of ecoregions in South Sudan, as identified by the Worldwide Fund for Nature (WWF).

== Terrestrial ecoregions ==
by major habitat type

=== Tropical and subtropical moist broadleaf forests ===
- East African montane forests

=== Tropical and subtropical grasslands, savannas, and shrublands ===
- East Sudanian savanna
- Northern Acacia–Commiphora bushlands and thickets
- Northern Congolian forest–savanna mosaic
- Sahelian Acacia savanna
- Victoria Basin forest–savanna mosaic

=== Flooded grasslands and savannas ===
- Saharan flooded grasslands

== Freshwater ecoregions ==
- Upper Nile
- Lake Turkana
