= List of ecoregions in Belarus =

This is a list of ecoregions in Belarus as defined by the World Wildlife Fund and the Freshwater Ecoregions of the World database.

== Terrestrial ecoregions ==
=== Temperate broadleaf and mixed forests ===
- Central European mixed forests
- Sarmatic mixed forests
