= List of ecoregions in Turkmenistan =

The following is a list of ecoregions in Turkmenistan, according to the Worldwide Fund for Nature (WWF):

== Terrestrial ==
=== Temperate grasslands, savannas and shrublands ===
- Alai-Western Tian Shan steppe (Kazakhstan, Uzbekistan, Tajikistan, Turkmenistan)

=== Montane grasslands and shrublands ===
- Kopet Dag woodlands and forest steppe (Turkmenistan, Iran)

=== Deserts and xeric shrublands ===
- Badghyz and Karabil semi-desert (Turkmenistan, Afghanistan, Uzbekistan, Tajikistan)
- Caspian lowland desert (Iran, Kazakhstan, Russia, Turkmenistan)
- Central Asian riparian woodlands (Kazakhstan, Uzbekistan, Turkmenistan)
- Central Asian southern desert (Kazakhstan, Uzbekistan, Turkmenistan)
- Kopet Dag semi-desert (Turkmenistan, Iran)
