= List of ecoregions in Oman =

The following is a list of ecoregions in Oman, as identified by the Worldwide Fund for Nature (WWF).

== Terrestrial ecoregions ==
Yemen lies on the boundary between two of the world's terrestrial biogeographic realms. The Afrotropical realm covers the mountainous southern and eastern fringe of the Arabian Peninsula as well as Sub-Saharan Africa and Madagascar. The Palearctic realm covers the interior of the Arabian Peninsula as well as temperate Eurasia and Northern Africa.

=== Temperate grasslands, savannas, and shrublands ===
- Al Hajar montane woodlands (Afrotropical)

=== Deserts and xeric shrublands ===
- Arabian Desert and East Sahero-Arabian xeric shrublands (Palearctic)
- Arabian Peninsula coastal fog desert (Afrotropical)
- Gulf of Oman desert and semi-desert (Afrotropical)
- Red Sea Nubo-Sindian tropical desert and semi-desert (Palearctic)
- Southwestern Arabian foothills savanna (Afrotropical)

== Marine ecoregions ==
- Gulf of Oman
- Western Arabian Sea
