= List of ecoregions in Italy =

== Terrestrial ==
Italy is in the Palearctic realm Ecoregions are listed by biome.

Temperate coniferous forests

- Alps conifer and mixed forests

Temperate broadleaf and mixed forests

- Po Basin mixed forests
- Apennine deciduous montane forests
- Dinaric Mountains mixed forests

Mediterranean forests, woodlands, and shrub

- Italian sclerophyllous and semi-deciduous forests
- South Apennine mixed montane forests
- Tyrrhenian-Adriatic sclerophyllous and mixed forests
- Northeastern Spain and Southern France Mediterranean forests
- Illyrian deciduous forests

== Freshwater ==
Temperate coastal rivers

- Gulf of Venice Drainages
- Italian Peninsula & Islands

== Marine ==
Italy's territorial waters are in the Temperate Northern Atlantic marine realm, and Mediterranean Sea marine province.

- Adriatic Sea
- Ionian Sea
- Western Mediterranean
