= List of ecoregions in Guinea =

The following is a list of ecoregions in Guinea, according to the Worldwide Fund for Nature (WWF).

== Terrestrial ecoregions ==
By major habitat type:

=== Tropical and subtropical moist broadleaf forests ===
- Guinean montane forests
- Western Guinean lowland forests

=== Tropical and subtropical grasslands, savannas, and shrublands ===
- Guinean forest-savanna mosaic
- West Sudanian savanna

=== Mangrove ===
- Guinean mangroves

== Freshwater ecoregions ==
By bioregion:

=== Nilo-Sudan ===
- Eburneo
- Upper Niger
- Senegal-Gambia

=== Upper Guinea ===
- Fouta-Djalon
- Mount Nimba
- Northern Upper Guinea
- Southern Upper Guinea
