= List of ecoregions in Djibouti =

The following is a list of ecoregions in Djibouti as identified by One Earth

== Terrestrial ==
Djibouti is in the Afrotropical realm. Two of its three ecoregions are in the deserts and xeric shrublands biome.

- Eritrean coastal desert
- Djibouti xeric shrublands
- Red Sea mangroves
