= List of ecoregions in Guyana =

This is a list of ecoregions in Guyana.

== Terrestrial ecoregions ==
Guyana is in the Neotropical realm. Ecoregions are listed by biome.

=== Tropical and subtropical moist broadleaf forests ===
- Guianan Highlands moist forests
- Guianan moist forests
- Orinoco Delta swamp forests
- Tepuis
- Uatuma-Trombetas moist forests

=== Tropical and subtropical grasslands, savannas, and shrublands ===
- Guianan savanna

=== Mangroves ===
- Guianan mangroves
