= List of ecoregions in Burkina Faso =

The following is a list of ecoregions in Burkina Faso, according to the Worldwide Fund for Nature (WWF).

== Terrestrial ecoregions ==
By major habitat type:

=== Tropical and subtropical grasslands, savannas, and shrublands ===
- Sahelian Acacia savanna
- West Sudanian savanna

== Freshwater ecoregions ==
By bioregion:

=== Nilo-Sudan ===
- Eburneo
- Volta
