= List of ecoregions in Niger =

The following is a list of ecoregions in Niger, according to the Worldwide Fund for Nature (WWF).

== Terrestrial ecoregions ==
By major habitat type:

=== Tropical and subtropical grasslands, savannas, and shrublands ===
- Sahelian Acacia savanna
- West Sudanian savanna

=== Flooded grasslands and savannas ===
- Lake Chad flooded savanna

=== Deserts and xeric shrublands ===
- Sahara desert
- South Saharan steppe and woodlands
- West Saharan montane xeric woodlands

== Freshwater ecoregions ==
By bioregion:

=== Nilo-Sudan ===
- Dry Sahel
- Lake Chad
- Lower Niger-Benue
