= List of ecoregions in Cyprus =

The following is a list of ecoregions in Cyprus, according to the Worldwide Fund for Nature (WWF):

== Terrestrial ==
=== Mediterranean forests, woodlands, and scrub ===
- Cyprus Mediterranean forests

== Freshwater ==
- Southern Anatolia

== Marine ==
- Levantine Sea
