= List of ecoregions in the Gambia =

The following is a list of ecoregions in Gambia, according to the Worldwide Fund for Nature (WWF).

== Terrestrial ecoregions ==
By major habitat type:

=== Tropical and subtropical grasslands, savannas, and shrublands ===
- Guinean forest-savanna mosaic
- West Sudanian savanna

=== Mangrove ===
- Guinean mangroves

== Freshwater ecoregions ==
By bioregion:

=== Nilo-Sudan ===
- Senegal-Gambia

== Marine ecoregions ==
- Sahelian upwelling
