= List of ecoregions in Lesotho =

The following is a list of ecoregions in Lesotho.

== Terrestrial ==
Lesotho is in the Afrotropical realm. Its three ecoregions are in the montane grasslands and shrublands biome.

- Drakensberg alti-montane grasslands and woodlands
- Drakensberg montane grasslands, woodlands and forests
- Highveld grasslands

== Freshwater ==
- Drakensberg - Maloti Highlands
- Southern Temperate Highveld
