= List of ecoregions in Tunisia =

The following is a list of ecoregions in Tunisia, according to the Worldwide Fund for Nature (WWF).

== Terrestrial ecoregions ==
=== Palearctic ===
==== Temperate coniferous forests ====
- Mediterranean conifer and mixed forests

==== Mediterranean forests, woodlands, and scrub ====
- Mediterranean dry woodlands and steppe
- Mediterranean woodlands and forests

==== Deserts and xeric shrublands ====
- North Saharan steppe and woodlands

==== Flooded grasslands and savannas ====
- Saharan halophytics

== Freshwater ecoregions ==
- Permanent Maghreb
- Temporary Maghreb

== Marine ecoregions ==
- Tunisian Plateau/Gulf of Sidra
- Western Mediterranean
