= List of ecoregions in the Dominican Republic =

The following is a list of ecoregions in the Dominican Republic, as identified by the World Wide Fund for Nature (WWF).

== Terrestrial ecoregions ==
=== Tropical and subtropical moist broadleaf forests ===
- Hispaniolan moist forests

=== Tropical and subtropical dry broadleaf forests ===
- Hispaniolan dry forests

=== Tropical and subtropical coniferous forests ===
- Hispaniolan pine forests

=== Flooded grasslands and savannas ===
- Enriquillo wetlands

=== Mangrove ===
- Greater Antilles mangroves

== Freshwater ecoregions ==
- Hispaniola

== Marine ecoregions ==
- Greater Antilles
