= List of ecoregions in the Solomon Islands =

The country of Solomon Islands includes portions of two archipelagoes - the southern portion of the Solomon Islands archipelago, and the Santa Cruz Islands, which are the northern extension of the Vanuatu archipelago. The geographic and ecological boundaries that define ecoregions can differ from political boundaries.

== Terrestrial ==
The Solomon Islands are in the Australasian realm. The Solomon Islands' two terrestrial ecoregions are in the tropical and subtropical moist broadleaf forests biome.

- Solomon Islands rain forests (includes the neighboring Autonomous Region of Bougainville in Papua New Guinea)
- Vanuatu rain forests (includes the Santa Cruz Islands and neighboring Vanuatu)

== Freshwater ==
- Solomon Islands (includes the Autonomous Region of Bougainville)

== Marine ==
- Solomon Archipelago
- Vanuatu (includes Santa Cruz Islands)
