= List of ecoregions in Paraguay =

This is a list of ecoregions in Paraguay.

== Terrestrial ecoregions ==
Paraguay is in the Neotropical realm. Ecoregions are listed by biome.

=== Tropical and subtropical moist broadleaf forests ===
- Alto Paraná Atlantic forests

=== Tropical and subtropical dry broadleaf forests ===
- Chaco (Dry Chaco)

=== Tropical and subtropical grasslands, savannas, and shrublands ===
- Cerrado
- Humid Chaco

=== Flooded grasslands and savannas ===
- Pantanal

== Freshwater ecoregions ==
- Chaco
- Lower Parana
- Upper Parana
- Paraguay
