= Eastern Indo-Pacific =

Region of the Pacific Ocean

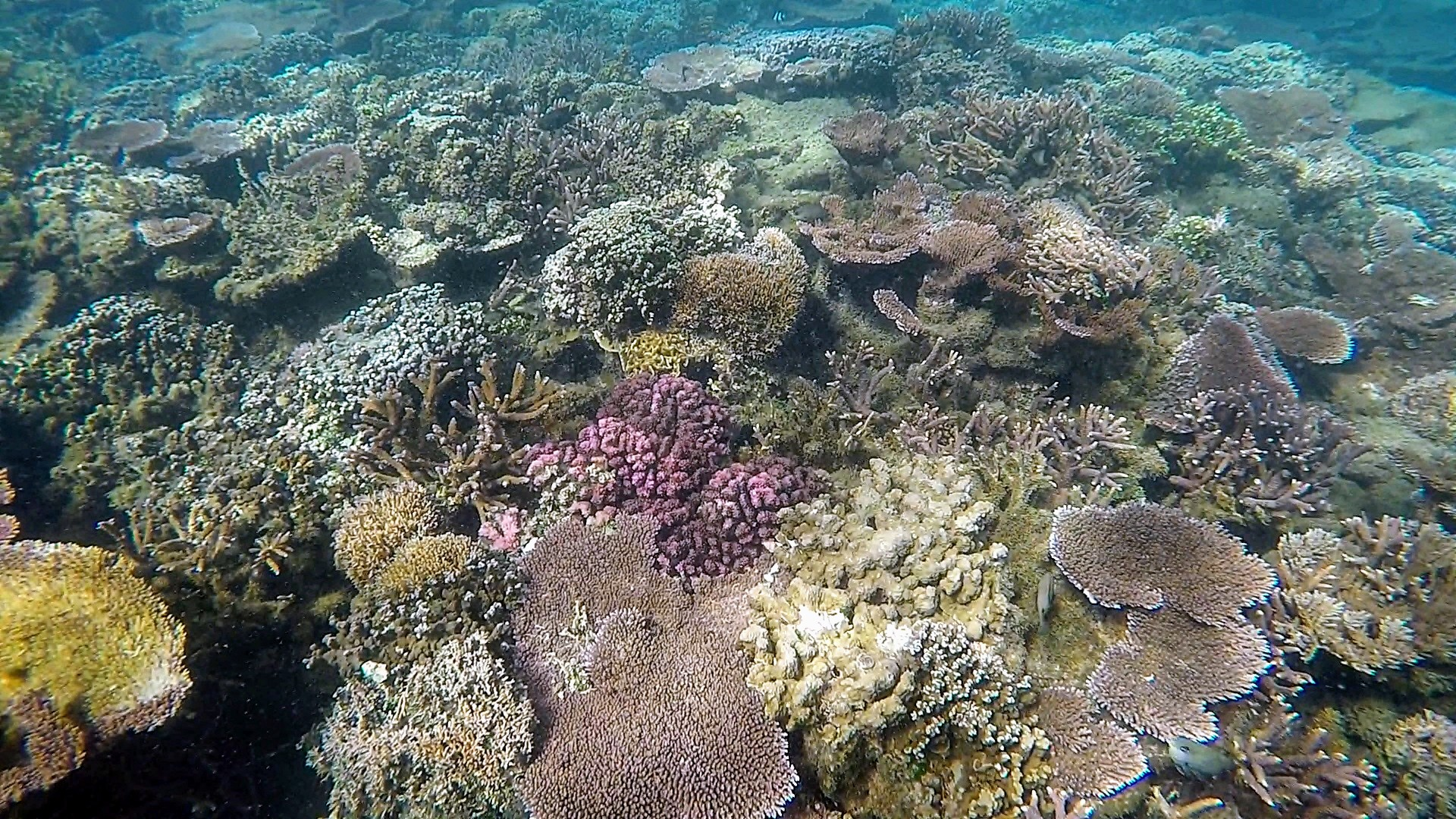
Coral off the coast of Upolu, Samoa.

The Eastern Indo-Pacific is a biogeographic region of the Earth's seas, comprising the tropical waters around island groups in the central Pacific Ocean. It includes most of Polynesia, except for New Zealand and the Kermadec Islands. It also includes the Marshall Islands and Kiribati from Micronesia. It adjoins the Central Indo-Pacific realm to the west, which encompasses Melanesia and the other island groups of Micronesia.

The Eastern Indo-Pacific is a marine realm, one of the great biogeographic divisions of the world's ocean basins.

== Subdivisions ==
The Eastern Indo-Pacific marine realm is divided into six marine provinces. Three provinces are further divided into marine ecoregions.

- Hawaii province
  - Hawaii
- Marshall, Gilbert, and Ellice Islands province
  - Marshall Islands
  - Gilbert and Ellice Islands
- Central Polynesia province
  - Line Islands
  - Phoenix Islands/Tokelau/Northern Cook Islands
  - Samoan Islands
- Southeast Polynesia province
  - Tuamotus
  - Rapa-Pitcairn
  - Southern Cook Islands/Austral Islands
  - Society Islands
- Marquesas province
  - Marquesas
- Easter Island province
  - Easter Island
