= Panama Bight =

Marine ecoregion on the Pacific coast of the Americas

The Panama Bight is a marine ecoregion on the Pacific coast of the Americas.

The Panama Bight extends eastwards from the Azuero Peninsula in Panama along the coast of the Gulf of Panama and Archipelago de las Perlas. It continues south along the entire Pacific coast of Colombia to the coast of northern Ecuador. The Nicoya marine ecoregion bounds it on the north, and the Guayaquil marine ecoregion bounds it on the south.

The Panama Bight ecoregion is home to rich coral beds in the near shore waters. While coral diversity is lower here than in the Caribbean Sea on the other side of Panama, the coral cover tends to be higher. In fact, the density of coral coverage here-90 percent coverage is common-is rarely seen in the Caribbean. In addition to the coral beds, enclaves of Panama Bight mangroves can be found in the tidal zone.

== Threats ==
El Niño climate events have warmed the water of this ecoregion, which has led to bleached and killed coral. Outbreaks of the crown-of-thorns starfish (Acanthaster planci) have also reduced coral populations. Siltation from soil erosion has destroyed many coral areas. Additionally threats include deforestation on shore and destruction of the reefs due to fishing, as well as damage from domestic pollution, dam construction, mining, oil shipping, and pesticides.

The Panama Bight ecoregion is one of the World Wildlife Fund's Global 200 priority ecoregions for conservation.
