= Middle East steppe =

Ecoregion of Jordan, Syria and Iraq

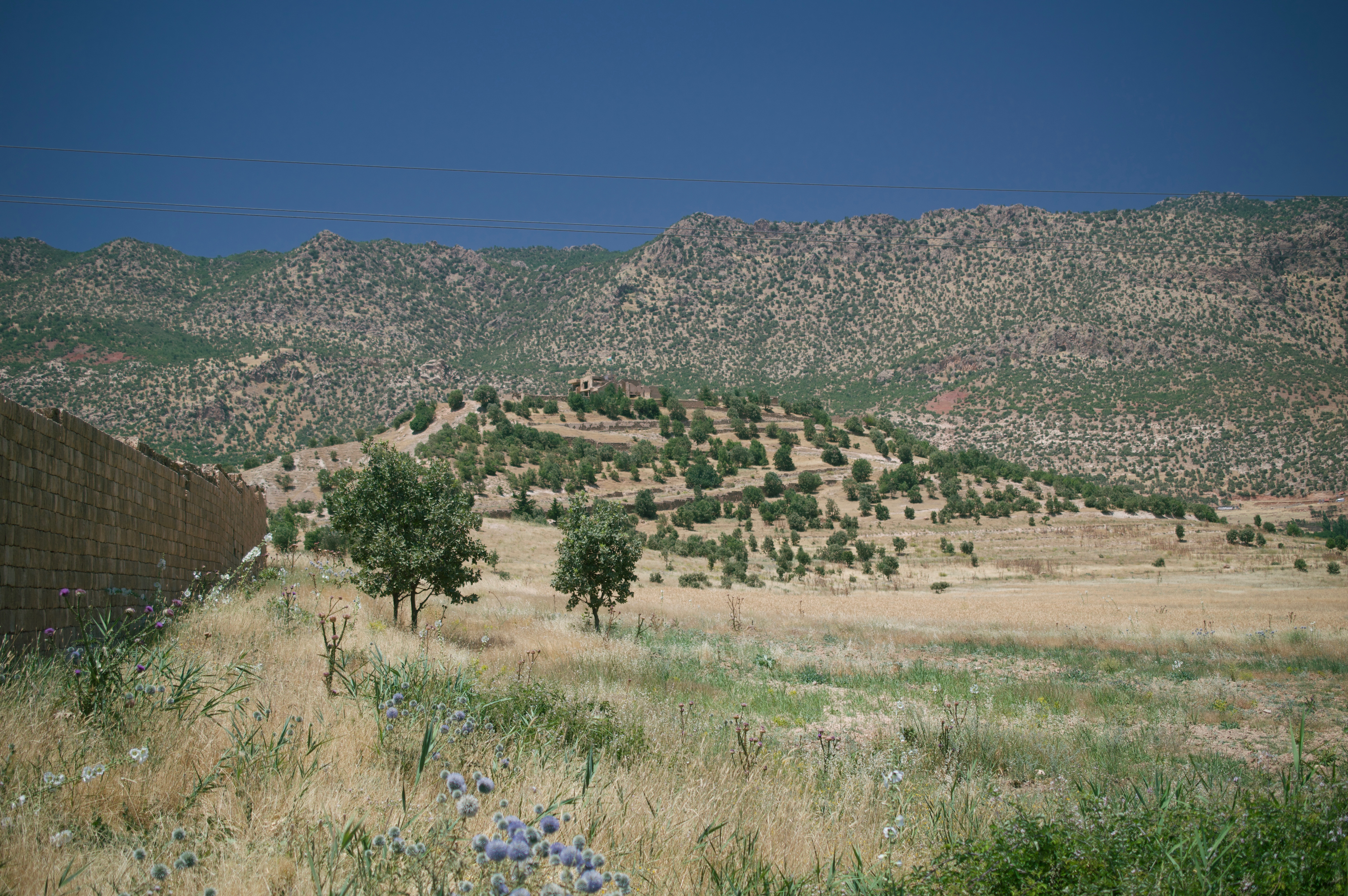
- Near Sarsink, Duhok Governorate, Iraq

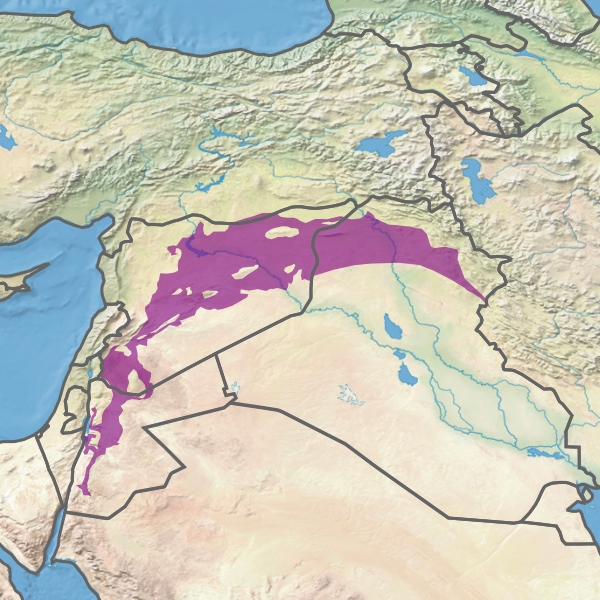
- Ecoregion territory (in purple)

Ecology
- Realm: Palearctic
- Biome: temperate grasslands, savannas, and shrublands
- Borders: List: Arabian Desert; Eastern Mediterranean conifer-sclerophyllous-broadleaf forests; Mesopotamian shrub desert; Red Sea Nubo-Sindian tropical desert and semi-desert; Zagros Mountains forest steppe

Geography
- Area: 132,589 km^{2} (51,193 sq mi)
- Country: Jordan, Syria, Iraq, Iran, Israel, Turkey
- Coordinates: 36.25°N 39.25°E

The Middle East steppe ecoregion (WWF ID: PA0812) stretches in an arc from southern Jordan across Syria and Iraq to the western border of Iran. The upper plains of the Tigris and Euphrates Rivers dominate most of the ecoregion. The terrain is mostly open shrub steppe. The climate is arid (less than 250 mm of precipitation per year). Evidence is that this region was once more of a forest-steppe, but centuries of overgrazing and gathering firewood have reduced tree and grass cover to small areas and along the riverine corridors. Despite the degraded condition of the steppe environment, the ecoregion is important for water birds as the rivers and reservoirs provide habitat in the arid region.

== Location and description ==
Most of the ecoregion is in upper Syria and Iraq, with a thin extension through western Jordan that almost reaches the Gulf of Aqaba in the south, and almost touching the border with Iran in the east. The terrain is flat plains or hills, with an average elevation of 468 metres (1,535 ft). The ecoregion to the south is the Mesopotamian shrub desert, and to the north is the Eastern Mediterranean conifer-sclerophyllous-broadleaf forests ecoregion.

== Climate ==
The climate of the ecoregion is Hot semi-arid climates (Köppen climate classification (BSh)). This climate is characteristic of steppes, with hot summers and cool or mild winters, and minimal precipitation. The coldest month averages above 0 °C (32 °F). Precipitation averages less than 200 mm/year.

== Flora and fauna ==
The region is one of shrub steppe, crossed by riverine woodlands in places. In deep, non-saline soils the dominant shrubs are white wormwood (Artemisia herba-alba), associated with bulbous bluegrass (Poa bulbosa). Stonier soils support Hammada scoparia. Areas near water support (Tamarix), Euphrates poplar (Populus euphratica), and reeds (Phragmites).

In heavily-vegetated areas with little to no human population, some large mammals are found, including the European badger (Meles meles), wild boar (Sus scrofa), golden jackal (Canis aureus), Rüppell's fox (Vulpes rueppellii), Dorcas gazelle (Gazella dorcas), striped hyena (Hyaena hyaena), caracal (Caracal caracal), and the vulnerable Arabian goitered gazelle (Gazella subgutturosa).

The Syrian wild ass (Equus hemionus hemippus) once ranged across the ecoregion but was hunted to extinction by the early 20th century. Similarly, the Arabian ostrich and the Syrian elephant are hypothesised to have inhabited the region in the past but have been extinct for millennia. The large predators of the Arabian Plate, including the lion (Panthera leo), Syrian brown bear (Ursus arctos syriacus), Arabian wolf (Canis lupus), and cheetah (Acinonyx jubatus) have been mostly or completely extirpated from over-hunting and habitat loss.

For migratory water birds, the Euphrates River valley serves as a major migration route between the wetlands of Turkey and the wetlands of Iraq. Many of these species depend on a combination of wetlands and arid desert habitat. Birds in the ecoregion of conservation interest include vulnerable Houbara bustard (Chlamydotis undulata), the vulnerable Great bustard (Otis tarda), and the near-threatened little bustard (Tetrax tetrax).

== Protected areas ==
Less than 1% of the ecoregion is officially protected. These protected areas include:

- Wujib Nature Reserve (Jordan)
- Dana Biosphere Reserve (Jordan)
- Fifa Nature Reserve (Jordan)
