= Mesopotamian shrub desert =

Desert ecoregion in West Asia

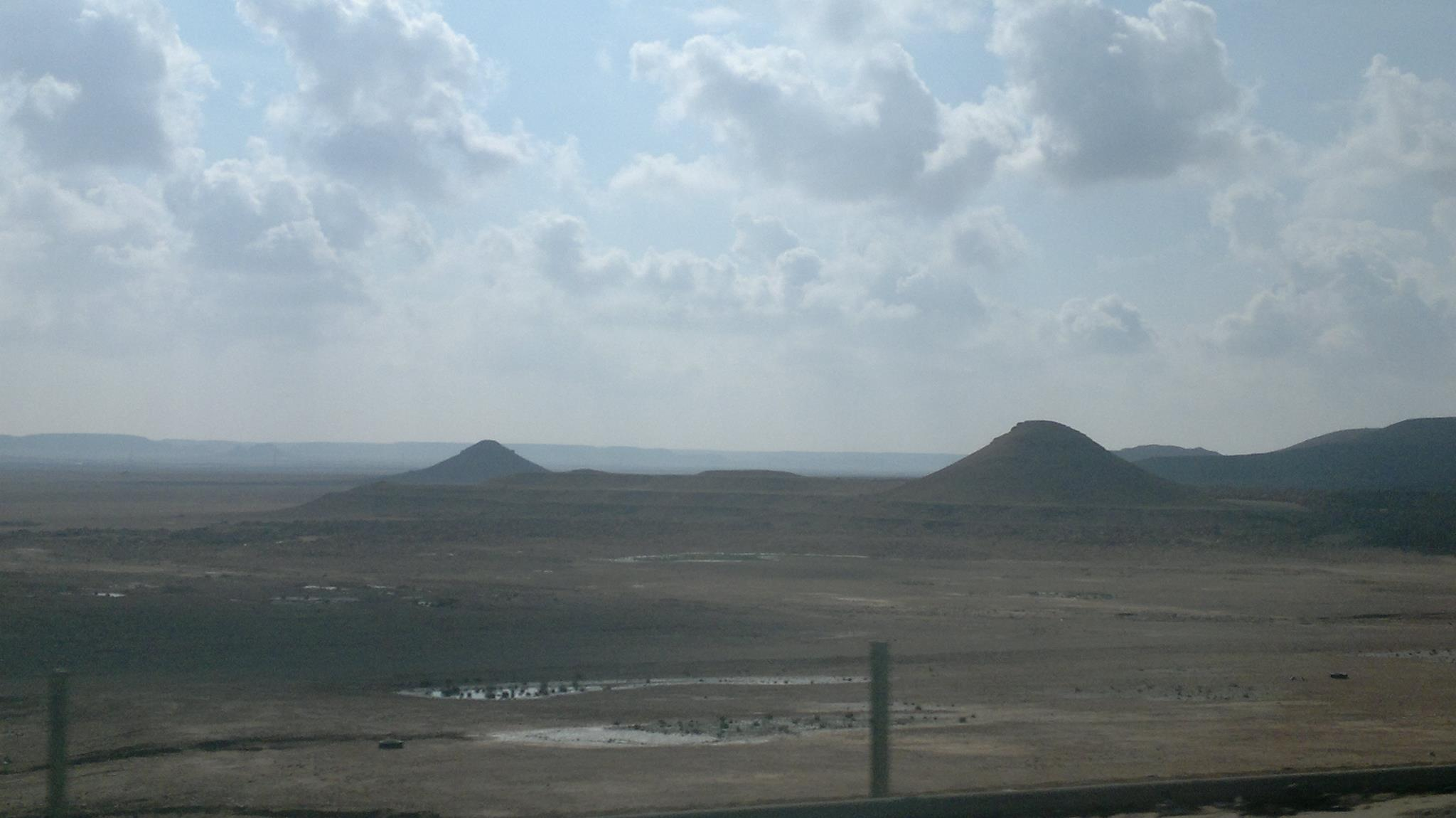
- Iraq-Jordan border area

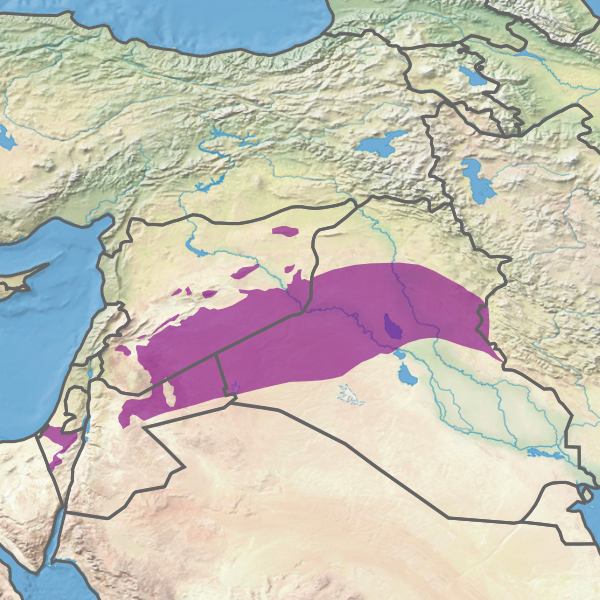
- Map of the ecoregion

Ecology
- Realm: Palearctic
- Biome: deserts and xeric shrublands
- Borders: List: Arabian Desert; Eastern Mediterranean conifer-sclerophyllous-broadleaf forests; Middle East steppe; Red Sea Nubo-Sindian tropical desert and semi-desert; South Iran Nubo-Sindian desert and semi-desert; Zagros Mountains forest steppe

Geography
- Area: 211,445 km^{2} (81,639 mi^{2})
- Countries: List: Iraq; Iran; Israel; Jordan; Palestine; Syria

Conservation
- Conservation status: Vulnerable
- Protected: 0.75%

The Mesopotamian shrub desert is an ecoregion of deserts and xeric shrublands located in West Asia. It extends across portions of Israel, Palestine, Jordan, Syria, Iraq, and Iran.

== Geography ==
The Mesopotamian shrub desert is a transitional region between the semi-arid steppes of northern Mesopotamia and the Levant to the north, and the Arabian Desert to the south.

The western portion of the ecoregion consists of rocky or sandy plateaus, including the Syrian Desert in southern Syria and northern Jordan, and a portion of the Harrat al-Sham black basalt desert in eastern Jordan. The eastern portion of the ecoregion includes central Mesopotamia, and the Tigris and Euphrates rivers run through it.

== Climate ==
The ecoregion has an arid subtropical climate. Rainfall averages 120 mm per year, concentrated in the winter months. Daytime temperatures often exceed 40 °C (104 °F) in the summer months. Winters are cooler, and temperatures can fall below freezing on winter nights.

== Flora ==
Typical vegetation is dry shrubland. Shrubs include species of Artemisia, Anabasis, and Haloxylon. Perennial herbaceous plants include Achillea fragrantissima and Astragalus spp., and the grass Stipagrostis plumosa. Fast-growing ephemeral herbs sprout after rains and quickly set seed before the succumbing to the summer drought.

Poplar trees (Populus euphratica), reeds, and bulrushes are found in the seasonal and permanent wetlands along the Tigris and Euphrates rivers.

== Fauna ==
Native mammals include golden jackal (Canis aureus), Rüppell's fox (Vulpes rueppellii), and striped hyena (Hyaena hyaena). Small populations of sand cat (Felis margarita), Arabian oryx (Oryx leucoryx), Dorcas gazelle, and Arabian sand gazelle (Gazella marica) are found as well.

The Syrian wild ass (Equus hemionus hemippus) once ranged across the ecoregion but was hunted to extinction by the early 20th century. Similarly, the Arabian ostrich, Syrian elephant, and the Arabian wolf are hypothesised to have inhabited the region in the past. The former have been extinct for millennia, and the latter's presence has receded to the Arabian Desert.

Native birds include the mourning wheatear (Oenanthe lugens), and the Mesopotamian hooded crow (Corvus cornix capellanus) in Mesopotamia. The area around Lake Tharthar, a reservoir between the Tigris and Euphrates, is a wintering ground for several threatened birds, including the Saker falcon (Falco cherrug) and Houbara bustard (Chlamydotis undulata).

== Protected areas ==
Less than 1% of the ecoregion is in protected areas. Protected areas include Azraq Wetland Reserve and Burqu Nature Reserve in Jordan, and Al-Talila Reserve in Syria.
