= Tropical Eastern Pacific =

Marine realm

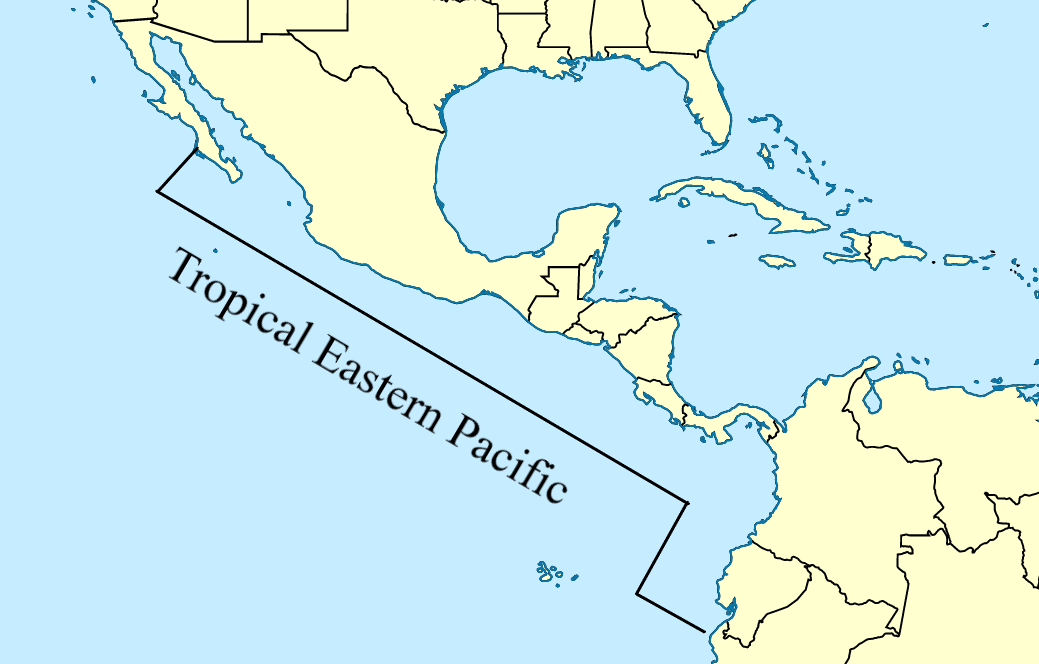
Map of Tropical Eastern Pacific region

The Tropical Eastern Pacific is one of the twelve marine realms that cover the coastal waters and continental shelves of the world's oceans. The Tropical Eastern Pacific extends along the Pacific Coast of the Americas, from the southern tip of the Baja California Peninsula in the north to northern Peru in the south. It is bounded on the north by the Temperate Northern Pacific realm, and on the south by the Temperate South America realm.

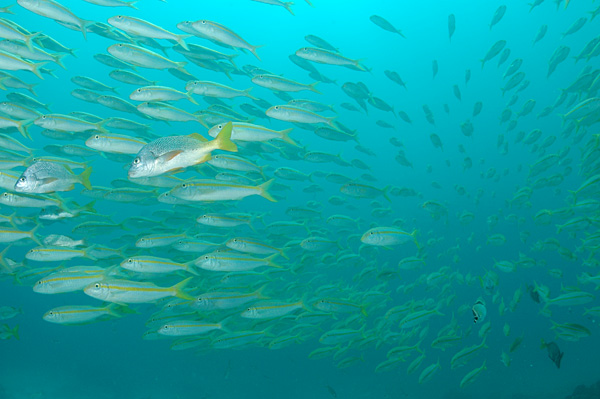
School of goatfish off the coast of the Galápagos Islands, Ecuador

It includes a number of oceanic islands and oceanic island groups like the Galápagos Islands, Revillagigedo Islands, Cocos Island, and Clipperton Island. Clipperton has been labelled as a meeting point between the Oceanian realm and the Tropical Eastern Pacific realm. The Galápagos Islands are also believed to have much higher percentages of Indo-West Pacific species in their marine faunas when compared to the continental American coasts. A 2018 study revealed interconnectivity of species between the Line Islands, Hawaii and Clipperton, as well as interconnectivity between the Galápagos Islands and Marquesas Islands in French Polynesia. The study identified the Northern Galápagos Islands as a "critical stepping-stone connecting the Central Pacific and Eastern Pacific."

The WWF and Nature Conservancy divide the Tropical Eastern Pacific realm into two marine provinces, Tropical East Pacific and Galápagos, which are further subdivided into marine ecoregions.

== Ecoregions ==
- Tropical East Pacific Marine Province
  - Revillagigedos
  - Clipperton
  - Mexican Tropical Pacific
  - Chiapas–Nicaragua
  - Nicoya
  - Cocos Island
  - Panama Bight
  - Guayaquil
- Galápagos Marine Province
  - Northern Galápagos Islands
  - Eastern Galápagos Islands
  - Western Galápagos Islands
