= Pannonian mixed forests =

European ecoregion

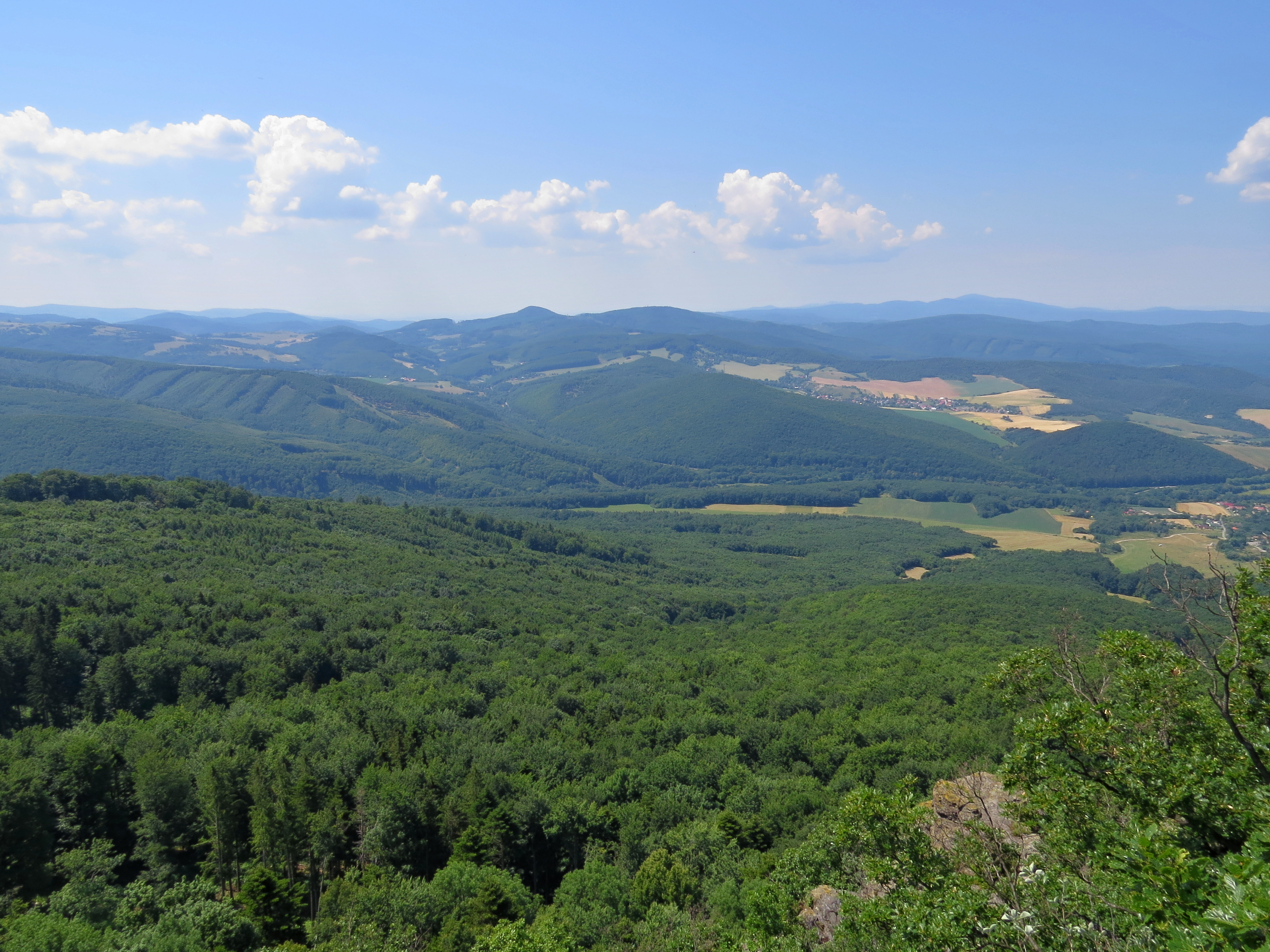
- Buchlov Nature Reserve

- location of the Pannonian mixed forests

Ecology
- Realm: Palearctic
- Biome: temperate broadleaf and mixed forests
- Borders: List: Alps conifer and mixed forests; Balkan mixed forests; Carpathian montane forests; Central European mixed forests; Dinaric Mountains mixed forests; Western European broadleaf forests

Geography
- Area: 307,720 km^{2} (118,810 mi^{2})
- Countries: List: Austria; Bosnia and Herzegovina; Croatia; Czech Republic; Hungary; Romania; Serbia; Slovakia; Slovenia, Ukraine

Conservation
- Conservation status: Critical/endangered
- Protected: 55,223 km^{2} (18%)

The Pannonian mixed forests is a temperate broadleaf and mixed forests ecoregion in Europe. It covers an area of 307,720 km^{2} in all of Hungary, most of Slovakia, about half of Croatia and Slovenia, around a third of Bosnia and Herzegovina, Romania, and Serbia, and minor parts of Austria, Czech Republic, and Ukraine.

== Flora ==
The plant communities include mixed oak-hornbeam forests, azonal floodplain vegetation and lowland to montane herb-grass steppes.

Mixed oak-hornbeam forests are mixed forests of pedunculate oak and sessile oak and hornbeam. Sub-Mediterranean thermophilous bitter oak forests grow in warmer areas. These forests are dominated by Quercus pubescens, Quercus cerris, and Quercus frainetto mixed with other trees, mainly Fraxinus ornus and Carpinus orientalis. Higher elevation areas are dominated by European beech and silver birch, downy birch, European aspen and sometimes by conifers Abies alba, Picea abies, Pinus sylvestris, Pinus nigra.

Riparian forest and azoal floodplain vegetation occurs along rivers and lakes. It is dominated by Populus nigra, Populus alba, Salix alba, Alnus glutinosa, Fraxinus oxycarpa, Ulmus minor and Quercus robur. Phragmites australis is dominant in most wetlands.

Lowland to montane herb-grass steppes dominate large areas of the ecoregion. The dominant species are Stipa zalesskii, Bromus riparius and the shrubs Prunus fruticosa and Prunus spinosa.

== Fauna ==
=== Mammals ===
- brown bear
- red deer
- roe deer
- eurasian beaver
- eurasian lynx
- grey wolf
- red fox
- european wildcat
- speckled ground squirrel
- European ground squirrel
- common mole
- white toothed pygmy shrew
- Eurasian pygmy shrew
- alpine shrew
- particolored bat
- European free-tailed bat
- wild boar

=== Reptiles and amphibians ===
- Hermann's tortoise
- nose-horned viper
- field adder
- European green lizard
- great crested newt
- Carpathian newt
- Danube crested newt
- Italian crested newt
- smooth newt
- alpine newt

=== Birds ===
- little tern
- great bustard
- lapwing
- common redshank
- barn owl
- ural owl
- tawny owl
- Western capercaillie
- black grouse
- Eurasian hoopoe
- mistle thrush
- song thrush
- ring ouzel
- fieldfare
- redwing
- common blackbird
- Eurasian wren
- wallcreeper
- common starling
- barred warbler
- lesser whitethroat
- Eastern subalpine warbler
- orphean warbler
- common whitethroat
- garden warbler
- blackcap
- European turtle dove
- Eurasian collared dove
- western rock nutthatch
- wood nuthatch
