= Temperate Northern Atlantic =

Biogeographic region of the Earth's seas

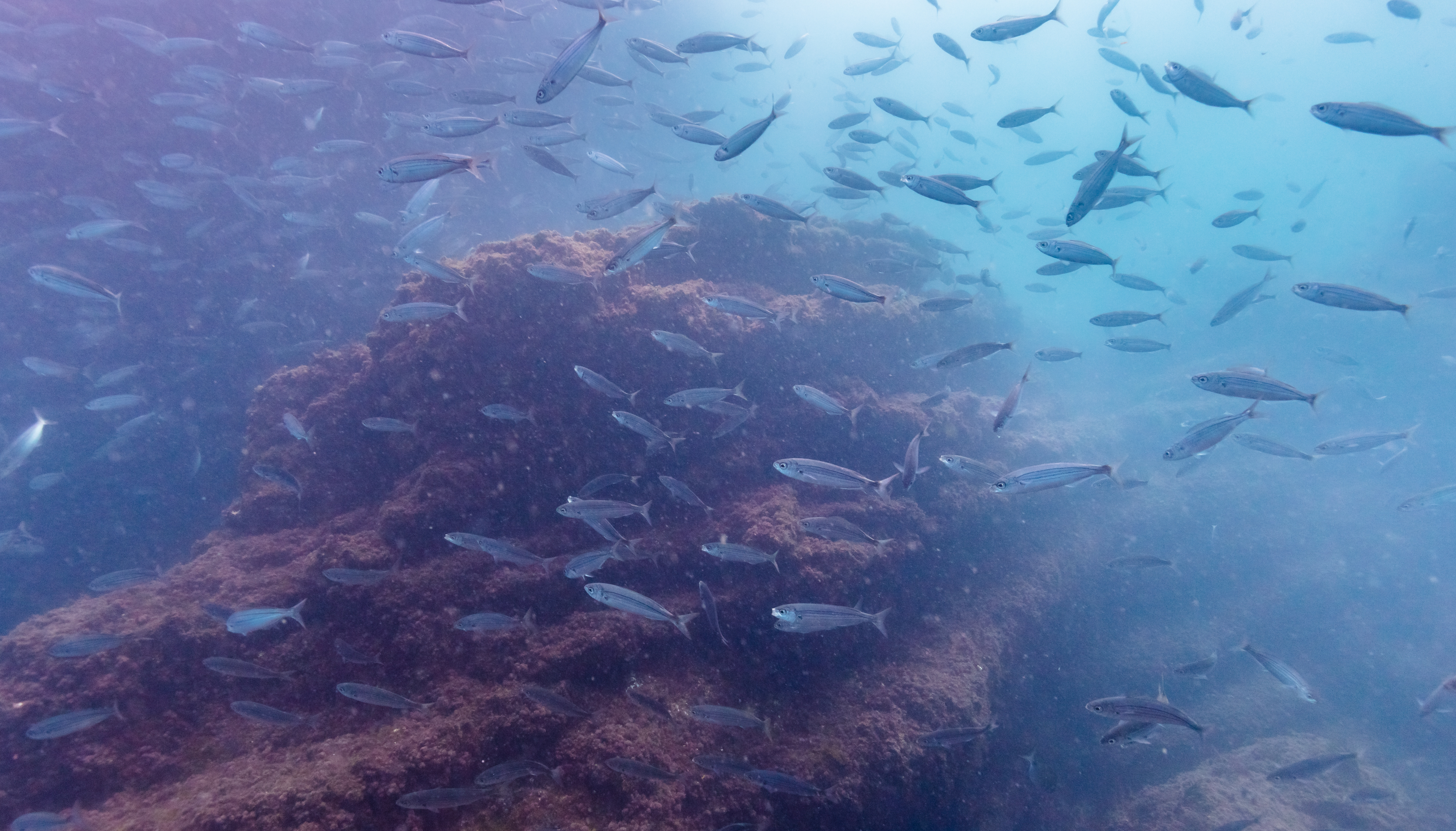
School of bogues off the coast of Cantabria, Spain.

The Temperate Northern Atlantic is a biogeographic region of the Earth's seas, comprising the temperate and subtropical waters of the North Atlantic Ocean and connecting seas, including the Mediterranean Sea, Black Sea, and northern Gulf of Mexico. It is a marine realm, one of the great biogeographic divisions of the world's ocean basins.

The tropical waters of the Atlantic Ocean, Gulf of Mexico, and Caribbean Sea are part of the Tropical Atlantic marine realm. To the north, the Temperate North Atlantic transitions to the Arctic realm.

== Subdivisions ==
The Temperate Northern Atlantic realm is divided into six marine provinces. Five of the provinces are further divided into marine ecoregions. The Black Sea is both a province and an ecoregion.

=== Northern European Seas ===
- South and West Iceland
- Faroe Plateau
- Southern Norway
- Northern Norway and Finnmark
- Baltic Sea
- North Sea
- Celtic Seas

=== Lusitanian ===
- South European Atlantic Shelf
- Saharan Upwelling
- Azores Canaries Madeira

=== Mediterranean Sea ===
- Adriatic Sea
- Aegean Sea
- Levantine Sea
- Tunisian Plateau-Gulf of Sidra
- Ionian Sea
- Western Mediterranean
- Alboran Sea

=== Black Sea ===
- Black Sea

=== Cold Temperate Northwest Atlantic ===
- Gulf of Saint Lawrence-Eastern Scotian Shelf
- Southern Grand Banks-South Newfoundland
- Scotian Shelf
- Gulf of Maine-Bay of Fundy
- Virginian

=== Warm Temperate Northwest Atlantic ===
- Carolinian
- Northern Gulf of Mexico
