= List of ecoregions in Egypt =

The following is a list of ecoregions in Egypt, according to the Worldwide Fund for Nature (WWF).

== Terrestrial ecoregions ==
=== Palearctic ===
==== Mediterranean forests, woodlands, and scrub ====
- Mediterranean dry woodlands and steppe

==== Deserts and xeric shrublands ====
- North Saharan steppe and woodlands
- Red Sea coastal desert
- Sahara desert
- South Saharan steppe and woodlands
- Tibesti-Jebel Uweinat montane xeric woodlands

==== Flooded grasslands and savannas ====
- Nile Delta flooded savanna
- Saharan halophytics

== Freshwater ecoregions ==
- Dry Sahel
- Lower Nile
- Nile Delta
- Red Sea Coastal
- Temporary Maghreb

== Marine ecoregions ==
- Levantine Sea
- Northern and Central Red Sea
