= Outline of Egypt =

Country in North Africa and Asia

The Flag of Egypt

The Coat of arms of Egypt

The location of Egypt

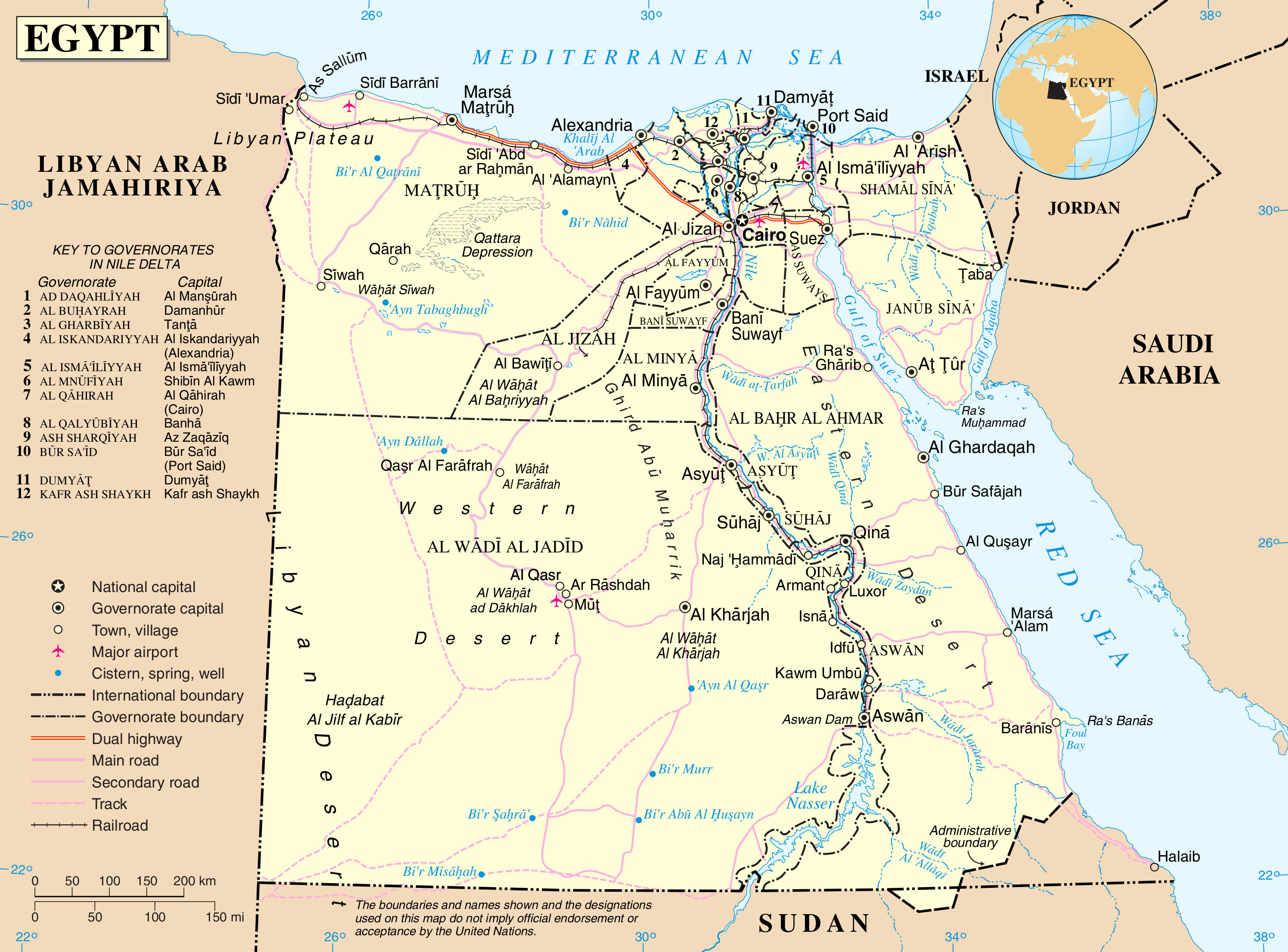
An enlargeable map of Egypt

The following outline is provided as an overview of and topical guide to Egypt:

Egypt, officially the Arab Republic of Egypt, is a country spanning the northeast corner of Africa and southwest corner of Asia via the Sinai Peninsula. It is bordered by the Mediterranean Sea to the north, Palestine and Israel to the northeast, the Red Sea to the east, Sudan and the Sahara to the south, and Libya to the west. The Gulf of Aqaba in the northeast separates Egypt from Jordan and Saudi Arabia. Cairo is the capital, largest city, and leading cultural centre, while Alexandria is the second-largest city and an important hub of industry and tourism. With over 107 million inhabitants, Egypt is the most populous country in the Arab world, third-most populous country in Africa, and 15th-most populated in the world.

== General reference ==
- Pronunciation: /ˈiːdʒɪpt/
- Common English country name: Egypt
- Official English country name: The Arab Republic of Egypt
- Common endonym(s): Misr
- Official endonym(s): Ǧumhūriyyat Miṣr al-ʿArabiyyah
- Adjectival(s): Egyptian
- Demonym(s): Egyptian(s)
- Etymology: Name of Egypt
- International rankings of Egypt
- ISO country codes: EG, EGY, 818
- ISO region codes: See ISO 3166-2:EG
- Internet country code top-level domain: .eg

== Geography of Egypt ==
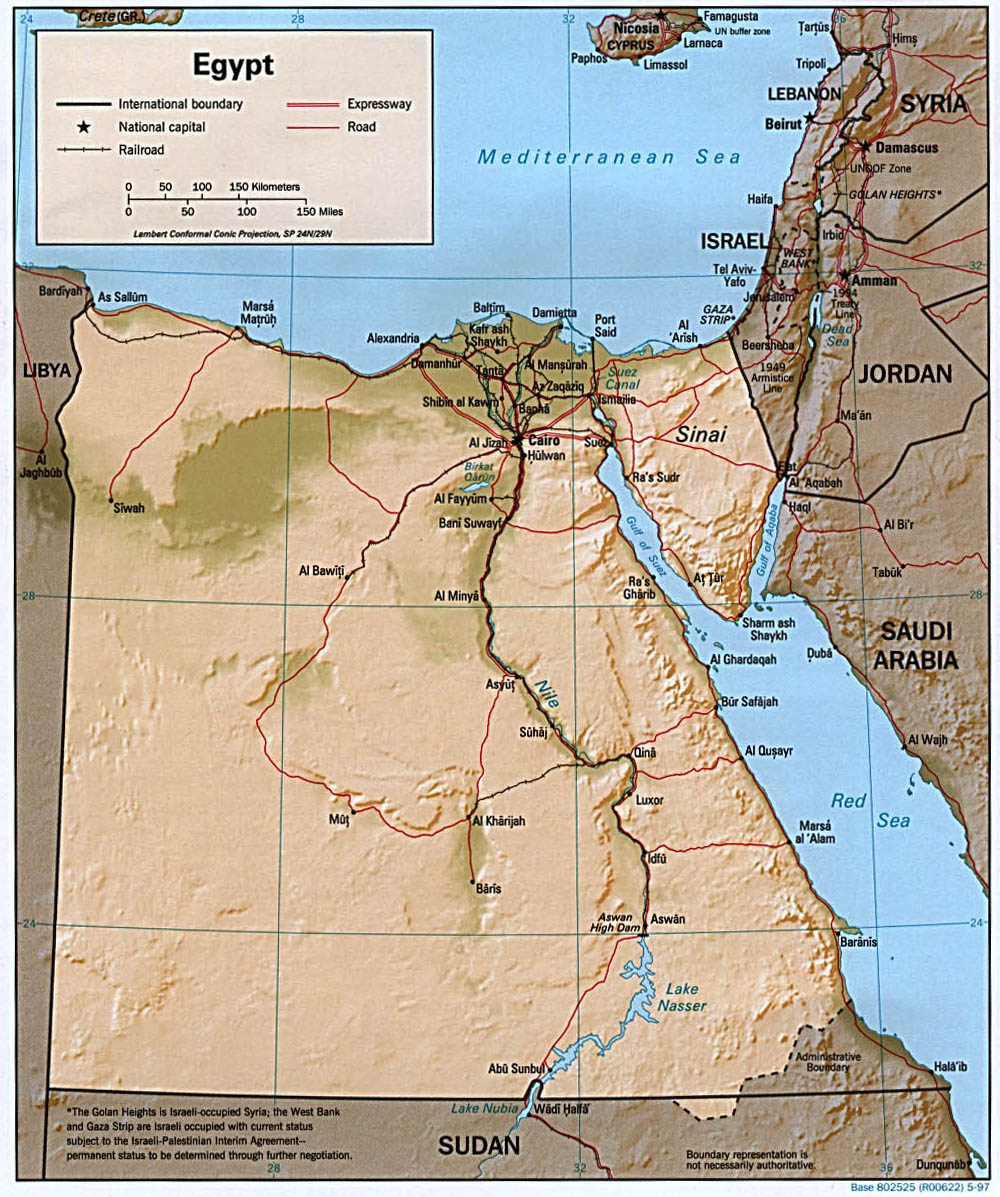
An enlargeable relief map of Egypt

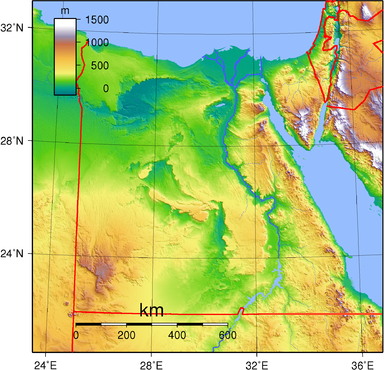
An enlargeable topographic map of Egypt

- Egypt is: a country
- Location
  - Egypt is situated within the following regions:
    - Northern Hemisphere and Eastern Hemisphere
    - Africa
      - North Africa
      - Sahara Desert
    - Eurasia
      - Asia
        - Southwest Asia
    - Middle East
  - Time zone: Egypt Standard Time (UTC+02), Egypt Daylight Time (UTC+03) April–September
  - Extreme points of Egypt
    - High: Mount Catherine 2,629 m (8,625 ft)
    - Low: Qattara Depression −133 m (−436 ft)
  - Land boundaries: 2,665 km (1,656 mi)

Sudan 1,273 km (791 mi)
Libya 1,115 km (693 mi)
Israel 266 km (165 mi)
Palestine 11 km (7 mi)

- Coastline: 2,450 km (1,522 mi)

- Population of Egypt: 88,662,800 people (2015 estimate) - 14th most populous country
- Area of Egypt: 1,002,450 km^{2} (387,050 sq mi) - 30th largest country
- Atlas of Egypt

=== Environment of Egypt ===
- Climate of Egypt
- Environmental issues in Egypt
- Ecoregions of Egypt
- Renewable energy in Egypt
- Geology of Egypt
- Wildlife of Egypt
  - Fauna of Egypt
    - Birds of Egypt
    - Mammals of Egypt
- Center for Documentation of Cultural and Natural Heritage

==== Geographic features of Egypt ====
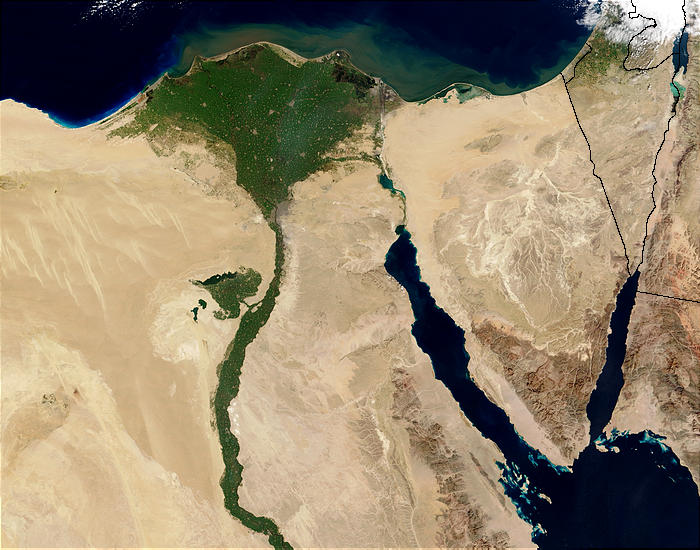
An enlargeable satellite image of the lower Nile River and Delta.

- Deserts of Egypt
  - Western Desert
  - Eastern Desert
- Glaciers in Egypt: none
- Lakes of Egypt
- Rivers of Egypt
- World Heritages Sites in Egypt
- Suez Canal

=== Regions of Egypt ===
- Nile Valley and Delta
- Western Desert (also known as the Libyan Desert)
- Eastern Desert (also known as the Arabian Desert)
- Sinai Peninsula

==== Ecoregions of Egypt ====
List of ecoregions in Egypt

==== Administrative divisions of Egypt ====
Administrative divisions of Egypt

- Governorates of Egypt (27)
  - Markazes of Egypt (166)
    - Municipalities of Egypt
      - Districts of Egypt

===== Governorates of Egypt =====
Governorates of Egypt

Governorates of Egypt

Nr.	Name	Area (km^{2})	Population (2015)	Capital
2	Alexandria	2,300	4,812,186	Alexandria
27	Aswan	62,726	1,431,488	Aswan
22	Asyut	25,926	4,245,215	Asyut
3	Beheira	9,826	5,804,262	Damanhur
19	Beni Suef	10,954	2,856,812	Beni Suef
16	Cairo	3,085	9,278,441	Cairo
5	Dakahlia	3,538	5,949,001	Mansura
6	Damietta	910	1,330,843	Damietta
15	Faiyum	6,068	3,170,150	Faiyum
9	Gharbia	1,942	4,751,865	Tanta
14	Giza	13,184	7,585,115	Giza
13	Ismailia	5,067	1,178,641	Ismailia
4	Kafr el-Sheikh	3,467	3,172,753	Kafr el-Sheikh
26	Luxor	2,410	1,147,058	Luxor
1	Matruh	166,563	447,846	Mersa Matruh
20	Minya	32,279	5,156,702	Minya
10	Monufia	2,499	3,941,293	Shibin el-Kom
21	New Valley	440,098	225,416	Kharga
8	North Sinai	28,992	434,781	Arish
7	Port Said	1,345	666,599	Port Said
11	Qalyubia	1,124	5,105,972	Banha
25	Qena	10,798	3,045,504	Qena
23	Red Sea	119,099	345,775	Hurghada
12	Sharqia	4,911	6,485,412	Zagazig
24	Sohag	11,022	4,603,861	Sohag
18	South Sinai	31,272	167,426	El-Tor
17	Suez	9,002	622,859	Suez

===== Municipalities of Egypt =====
List of cities in Egypt

- Capital of Egypt: Cairo (outline)

=== Demography of Egypt ===
Demographics of Egypt

- Censuses of Egypt
- DNA history of Egypt
- Population history of Egypt

==== Ethnicities ====
- Egyptians
- Nubians
- Copts
- Dom people
- Beja
- Bedouin
- Greeks
- Armenians

== Government and politics of Egypt ==
- Form of government: Semi-presidential republic
- Capital of Egypt: Cairo
- Elections in Egypt
- Political parties in Egypt
- Egyptian Revolution of 2011

=== Branches of the government of Egypt ===
Government of Egypt

==== Executive branch of the government of Egypt ====
- Head of state: is the President of Egypt.
- Head of government: is the President of Egypt.
  - Cabinet of Egypt

==== Legislative branch of the government of Egypt ====
  - Upper house: Senate
  - Lower house: House of Representatives

==== Judicial branch of the government of Egypt ====
Egyptian Judicial System

- Supreme Constitutional Court of Egypt
- Court of Appeal
- Court of First Instance
- Family Court

=== Foreign relations of Egypt ===
Foreign relations of Egypt

==== International organization membership ====
The Arab Republic of Egypt is a member of:

- African Development Bank Group (AfDB)
- African Union (AU)
- Malvern College Egypt (MCE)
- Arab Bank for Economic Development in Africa (ABEDA)
- Arab Fund for Economic and Social Development (AFESD)
- Arab Monetary Fund (AMF)
- Black Sea Economic Cooperation Zone (BSEC) (observer)
- Common Market for Eastern and Southern Africa (COMESA)
- Council of Arab Economic Unity (CAEU)
- European Bank for Reconstruction and Development (EBRD)
- Food and Agriculture Organization (FAO)
- Group of 15 (G15)
- Group of 24 (G24)
- Group of 77 (G77)
- International Atomic Energy Agency (IAEA)
- International Bank for Reconstruction and Development (IBRD)
- International Chamber of Commerce (ICC)
- International Civil Aviation Organization (ICAO)
- International Criminal Court (ICCt) (signatory)
- International Criminal Police Organization (Interpol)
- International Development Association (IDA)
- International Federation of Red Cross and Red Crescent Societies (IFRCS)
- International Finance Corporation (IFC)
- International Fund for Agricultural Development (IFAD)
- International Hydrographic Organization (IHO)
- International Labour Organization (ILO)
- International Maritime Organization (IMO)
- International Mobile Satellite Organization (IMSO)
- International Monetary Fund (IMF)
- International Olympic Committee (IOC)
- International Organization for Migration (IOM)
- International Organization for Standardization (ISO)
- International Red Cross and Red Crescent Movement (ICRM)
- International Telecommunication Union (ITU)
- International Telecommunications Satellite Organization (ITSO)
- Inter-Parliamentary Union (IPU)
- Islamic Development Bank (IDB)
- League of Arab States (LAS)
- Multilateral Investment Guarantee Agency (MIGA)
- Nonaligned Movement (NAM)
- Organisation internationale de la Francophonie (OIF)
- Organisation of Islamic Cooperation (OIC)
- Organization for Security and Cooperation in Europe (OSCE) (partner)
- Organization of American States (OAS) (observer)
- Organization of Arab Petroleum Exporting Countries (OAPEC)
- Permanent Court of Arbitration (PCA)
- United Nations (UN)
- United Nations Conference on Trade and Development (UNCTAD)
- United Nations Educational, Scientific, and Cultural Organization (UNESCO)
- United Nations High Commissioner for Refugees (UNHCR)
- United Nations Industrial Development Organization (UNIDO)
- United Nations Mission for the Referendum in Western Sahara (MINURSO)
- United Nations Mission in Liberia (UNMIL)
- United Nations Mission in the Central African Republic and Chad (MINURCAT)
- United Nations Mission in the Sudan (UNMIS)
- United Nations Observer Mission in Georgia (UNOMIG)
- United Nations Organization Mission in the Democratic Republic of the Congo (MONUC)
- United Nations Relief and Works Agency for Palestine Refugees in the Near East (UNRWA)
- Universal Postal Union (UPU)
- World Customs Organization (WCO)
- World Federation of Trade Unions (WFTU)
- World Health Organization (WHO)
- World Intellectual Property Organization (WIPO)
- World Meteorological Organization (WMO)
- World Tourism Organization (UNWTO)
- World Trade Organization (WTO)

Egypt is 1 of only 7 U.N. members which is not a member of the Organisation for the Prohibition of Chemical Weapons.

=== Law and order in Egypt ===
Law of Egypt

- Cannabis in Egypt
- Capital punishment in Egypt
- Constitution of Egypt
- Crime in Egypt
- Human rights in Egypt
  - LGBT rights in Egypt
  - Freedom of religion in Egypt
- Law enforcement in Egypt
  - Emergency law in Egypt

=== Media of Egypt ===
Media of Egypt

=== Military of Egypt ===
Military of Egypt

- Command
  - Commander-in-chief:
    - Ministry of Defence of Egypt
- Forces
  - Army of Egypt
  - Navy of Egypt
  - Air Force of Egypt
- Military history of Egypt
- Military ranks of Egypt

== History of Egypt ==
=== History of Egypt, by period ===
- History of Ancient Egypt: 3100 BC to 639 AD
  - Ancient Egypt
    - List of ancient Egypt topics
  - Early Dynastic Period of Egypt
    - First Dynasty of Egypt c. 3150–2890
    - Second Dynasty of Egypt: 2890–2686
  - Old Kingdom of Egypt
    - Third Dynasty of Egypt: 2686–2613
    - Fourth Dynasty of Egypt: 2613–2498
    - Fifth Dynasty of Egypt: 2498–2345
    - Sixth Dynasty of Egypt: 2345–2181
  - First Intermediate Period of Egypt
    - Seventh Dynasty of Egypt: 2181, usually considered spurious
    - Eighth Dynasty of Egypt: 2181–2160
    - Ninth Dynasty of Egypt: 2160–2130
    - Tenth Dynasty of Egypt: 2130–2040
    - Early Eleventh Dynasty of Egypt: 2134–2061
  - Middle Kingdom of Egypt
    - Late Eleventh Dynasty of Egypt: 2061–1991
    - Twelfth Dynasty of Egypt: 1991–1803
    - Thirteenth Dynasty of Egypt: 1803–1649
    - Fourteenth Dynasty of Egypt: 1705–1690
  - Second Intermediate Period of Egypt
    - Fifteenth Dynasty of Egypt: 1674–1535
    - Sixteenth Dynasty of Egypt: 1660–1600
    - Abydos Dynasty | | 1650–1600
    - Seventeenth Dynasty of Egypt: 1580–1549
  - New Kingdom of Egypt
    - Eighteenth Dynasty of Egypt: 1549–1292
    - Nineteenth Dynasty of Egypt: 1292–1189
    - Twentieth Dynasty of Egypt: 1189–1077
  - Third Intermediate Period of Egypt
    - Twenty-first Dynasty of Egypt: 1069–945
    - Twenty-second Dynasty of Egypt: 945–720
    - Twenty-third Dynasty of Egypt: 837–728
    - Twenty-fourth Dynasty of Egypt: 732–720
    - Twenty-fifth Dynasty of Egypt: 732–653
  - Late Period of ancient Egypt
    - Twenty-sixth Dynasty of Egypt: 672–525
    - History of Achaemenid Egypt: 525 BC to 332 BC
      - Twenty-seventh Dynasty of Egypt: 525–404
      - Twenty-eighth Dynasty of Egypt: 404–398
      - Twenty-ninth Dynasty of Egypt: 398–380
      - Thirtieth Dynasty of Egypt: 380–343
      - Thirty-first Dynasty of Egypt: 343–332
  - History of Ptolemaic Egypt: 332 BC to 30 BC
    - Argead Dynasty | 332–305
    - Ptolemaic Kingdom | 305–30
  - History of Roman Egypt: 30 BC to 639 AD
    - Diocese of Egypt c. 381 to 539
- Sasanian Egypt: 619 to 629
- History of Arab Egypt: 639 to 1517
  - Muslim conquest of Egypt
  - Saladin in Egypt 1163 to 1174
- History of Ottoman Egypt: 1517 to 1805
- History of Egypt under the Muhammad Ali dynasty: 1805 to 1882
  - Muhammad Ali's seizure of power
- History of modern Egypt: since 1882
  - History of Egypt under the British: 1882 to 1956
    - 1919 Egyptian revolution
      - Unilateral Declaration of Egyptian Independence
    - Egypt during World War II
    - History of republican Egypt 1952 to present
      - History of Egypt under Gamal Abdel Nasser 1952–1970
        - 1952 Egyptian revolution
        - Republic of Egypt (1953–58)
      - History of Egypt under Anwar Sadat 1970 to 1981
      - History of Egypt under Hosni Mubarak 1981–2011
      - Egyptian crisis (2011–14)
        - 2011 Egyptian revolution (also called "25th of January revolution")
        - June 2013 Egyptian protests
        - 2013 Egyptian coup d'état
        - Post-coup unrest in Egypt (2013–2014)

=== History of Egypt, by region ===
- History of Alexandria
  - Timeline of Alexandria
- History of Cairo
  - Timeline of Cairo
- History of Giza
- History of Luxor
- History of Memphis, Egypt
- History of the Nile Delta
- History of Port Said
  - Timeline of Port Said
- History of the Sinai Peninsula
- History of Suez

=== History of Egypt, by subject ===
- List of Egyptian inventions and discoveries
- DNA history of Egypt
- Egyptian capitals throughout history
- Egyptomania
- History of the Jews in Egypt
- Political history of Egypt
  - History of the Egyptian Constitution
  - Military history of Egypt
    - List of wars involving Egypt
  - History of the Egyptian parliament
- Population history of Egypt
- History of timekeeping devices in Egypt

== Culture of Egypt ==
Culture of Egypt

- Egyptians
- Architecture of Egypt
  - Ottoman architecture in Egypt
- Cuisine of Egypt
- Languages of Egypt
  - Egyptian language
- Media in Egypt
- National symbols of Egypt
  - Coat of arms of Egypt
  - Flag of Egypt
  - National anthem of Egypt
- Prostitution in Egypt
- Public holidays in Egypt
- Religion in Egypt
  - Islam in Egypt
  - Christianity in Egypt
  - Judaism in Egypt
  - Hinduism in Egypt
- World Heritage Sites in Egypt

=== Art in Egypt ===
- Art in Egypt (see also Art of Ancient Egypt)
  - Contemporary art in Egypt
- Cinema of Egypt
- Literature of Egypt
- Music of Egypt
- Television in Egypt
- Theatre in Egypt

=== Sports in Egypt ===
Sports in Egypt

- Egypt at the Olympics
- Football in Egypt

== Economy and infrastructure of Egypt ==
Economy of Egypt

- Economic rank, by nominal GDP (2007): 52nd (fifty-second)
- Agriculture in Egypt
- Communications in Egypt
  - Internet in Egypt
- Companies of Egypt
- Currency of Egypt: Pound
  - ISO 4217: EGP
- Energy in Egypt
- Health care in Egypt
- Mining in Egypt
- National Bank of Egypt
- Tourism in Egypt
- Transport in Egypt
  - Airports in Egypt
  - Rail transport in Egypt
- Water supply and sanitation in Egypt

== Education in Egypt ==
Education in Egypt

== See also ==
Egypt

- List of ancient Egypt topics
- List of international rankings
- Member state of the United Nations
- Outline of Africa
- Outline of Palestine
- Outline of Israel
- Outline of Libya
- Outline of Sudan
- Outline of geography
