= Mons Smaragdus =

Ancient emerald mining area in Egypt

Coordinates: 24.352101°N 35.048675°E

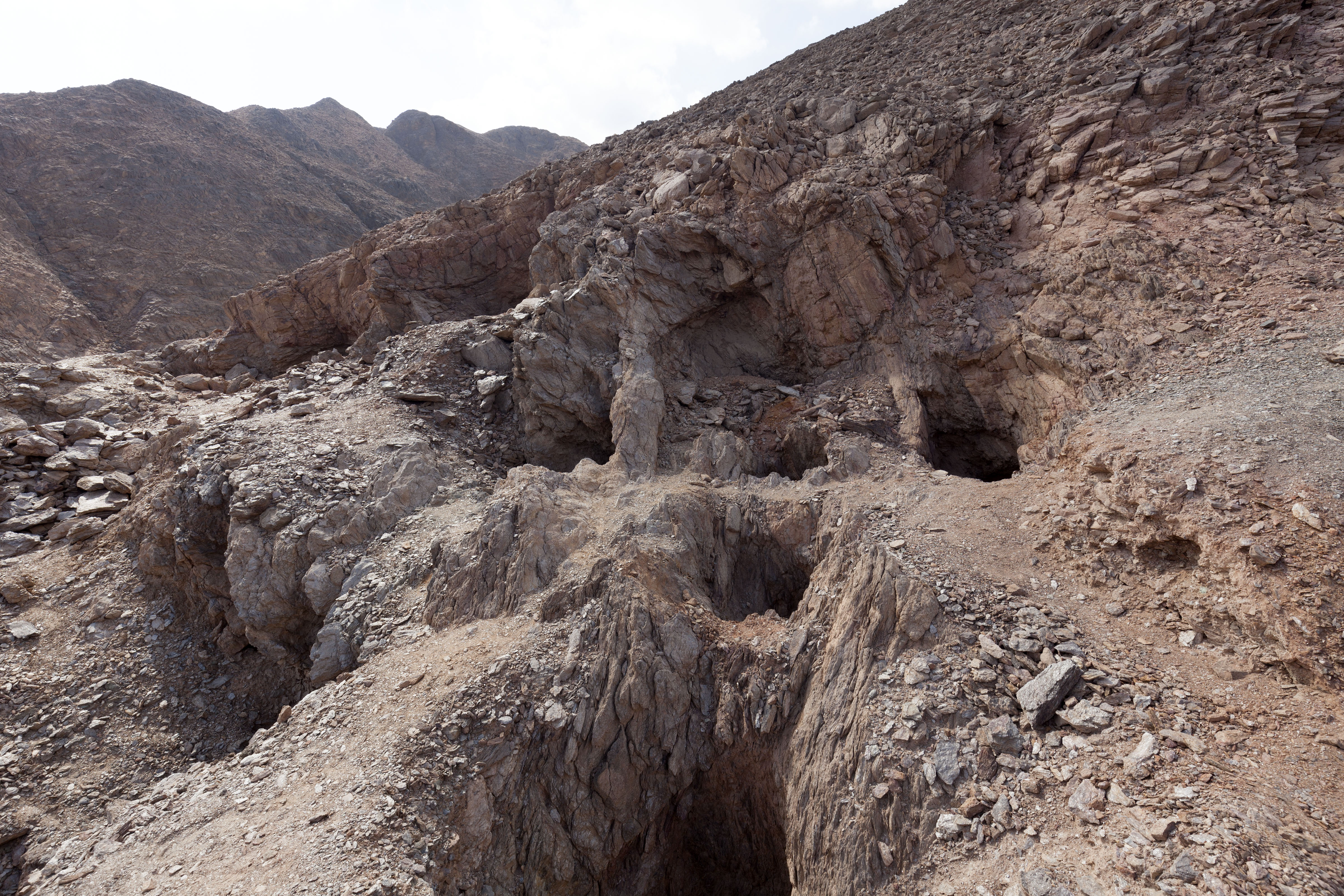

- Location within Egypt

Mons Smaragdus, also known as the Sikait Mines and the Cleopatra Mines, in Wadi El Gemal National Park, Egypt, some fifteen miles (24 km) from the coast of the Red Sea, is the site of emerald mining communities dating back to ancient Egypt.

These are the oldest-known emerald mines in the world, although archaeology has found most of the mining activities date to the Roman and Byzantine periods.

The Latin word smaragdus, which evolved into the Vulgar Latin esmaralda/esmaraldus, came from the Ancient Greek: σμάραγδος (smáragdos), meaning "green gem". The Greek word may have a Semitic, Sanskrit or Persian origin. While smáragdos is thus cognate with emerald, it can be a false friend, as the Greek word can mean any green gem, such as green jasper.

The mines are mentioned by Pliny the Elder in his Naturalis Historia, listing twelve emerald sources, among them the city of Coptos, north of Thebes on a caravan route passing the Egyptian emerald mines; and also by Ptolemy in the second century AD. Egyptian Greeks were working such mines at the time of Alexander the Great, but excavations at the worker camp at Sikait have securely dated the founding of this settlement to the 3rd century BC, meaning that the emerald deposits there were first exploited no earlier than the Ptolemaic period. Emeralds for Cleopatra are likely to have come from Sikait, as in the Roman period the mines there were the only emerald mines in the whole Roman Empire.

The location of the mines was lost for many centuries until they were discovered about 1817 by Frédéric Cailliaud near Wadi Sikait, some thirty miles (48 km) from the beginning of Wadi el Gemal. He was searching for sulphur, but also knew that this was the area where Pliny placed the legendary emerald mines. Mons Smaragdus is now known to be one of the oldest mining complexes of the pharaonic world, in use during the Ptolemaic period, 330 BC to 30BC.

The Pharaohs explored the southern desert valleys, seeking and finding gold and emeralds. Large quantities were mined.

Mohamed Abu El Wafa, director of antiquities in the Red Sea coastal desert, has reported that the Romans came into the Sikait Valley to mine emeralds after the pharaohs and built a small temple at Mons Smaragdus dedicated to Serapis, a Graeco-Egyptian deity. The remains of Roman buildings have been found.
