= International rankings of Egypt =

The following are international rankings of Egypt.

== Cities ==
- GaWC Inventory of World Cities, 1999: Cairo 2 points: Evidence of world city formation

== Economic ==
- The Wall Street Journal and The Heritage Foundation: Index of Economic Freedom 2007, ranked 127 out of 157 countries
- Free the World: Economic Freedom of the World 2007, ranked 76 out of 141
- International Monetary Fund: GDP (nominal) per capita 2007, ranked 115 out of 179 countries
- International Monetary Fund: GDP (nominal) 2006, ranked 51 out of 181 countries
- World Economic Forum: Global Competitiveness Index 2006–2007, ranked 63 out of 125 countries
- World Bank: Ease of Doing Business Index, ranked 126 out of 178 countries

== Environmental ==
- Yale University: Environmental Sustainability Index 2005, ranked 115 out of 146 countries
- New Economics Foundation: Happy Planet Index 2006, ranked 97 out of 178 countries

== Demographics ==
Demographics Rankings
| Name | Year | Place | Out of # | Reference |
|---|---|---|---|---|
| Population | 2007 | 16th | 223 | |
| Life Expectancy | 2005-2010 | 106th | 194 | |
| Population Growth Rate | 2005-2010 | 71st | 230 | |
| Population density | 2018 | 112th | 233 | |

== Energy ==
- Electricity production ranked 27 out of 211 countries
- Electricity consumption ranked 30 out of 190 countries
- Natural gas production ranked 20 out of 86 countries
- Natural gas consumption ranked 23 out of 211 countries
- Natural gas proven reserves ranked 18 out of 87 countries

== Military ==
Military Rankings
| Name | Year | Place | Out of # | Reference |
|---|---|---|---|---|
| The World Factbook: Military funding | 2009 | 45th | 153 | |
| CSIS: Active troops | 2010 | 10th | 165 | |

== Political ==
- Transparency International: Corruption Perceptions Index 2019, ranked 105 out of 179 countries
- Reporters Without Borders: Worldwide press freedom index 2020, ranked 166 out of 169 countries
- Economist Intelligence Unit: Democracy Index 2019, ranked 137 out of 169 countries
- Fund for Peace and Foreign Policy magazine: Failed States Index 2019, ranked 35 out of 177 countries

== Social ==
Social Rankings
| Name | Year | Place | Out of # | Reference |
|---|---|---|---|---|
| Economist Intelligence Unit: Quality-of-life index | 2005 | 80th | 111 | |
| United Nations Development Programme: Human Development Index | 2007 | 123rd | 182 | |
| KOF: Globalization Index | 2010 | 68th | 181 | |

== Technological ==
Technological Rankings
| Name | Year | Place | Out of # | Reference |
|---|---|---|---|---|
| Economist Intelligence Unit E-readiness | 2009 | 57th | 70 | |
| The World Factbook: Number of Internet users | 2010 | 27th | 195 | |
| Global Innovation Index (World Intellectual Property Organization) | 2026 | 83th | 139 | |

== Other ==
| Organization | Survey | Ranking |
|---|---|---|
| Institute for Economics and Peace | Global Peace Index | 54 out of 144 |
| World Health Organization | Road Traffic Deaths Index | 3 out of 178 |
| United Nations Development Programme | Human Development Index | 123 out of 182 |
| Transparency International | Corruption Perceptions Index | 111 out of 180 |
| World Economic Forum | Global Competitiveness Report | 70 out of 133 |

== See also ==
- Outline of Egypt
- Lists of sovereign states and dependent territories
- Lists by country
