= Red Sea coastal desert =

Ecoregion in Egypt and Sudan

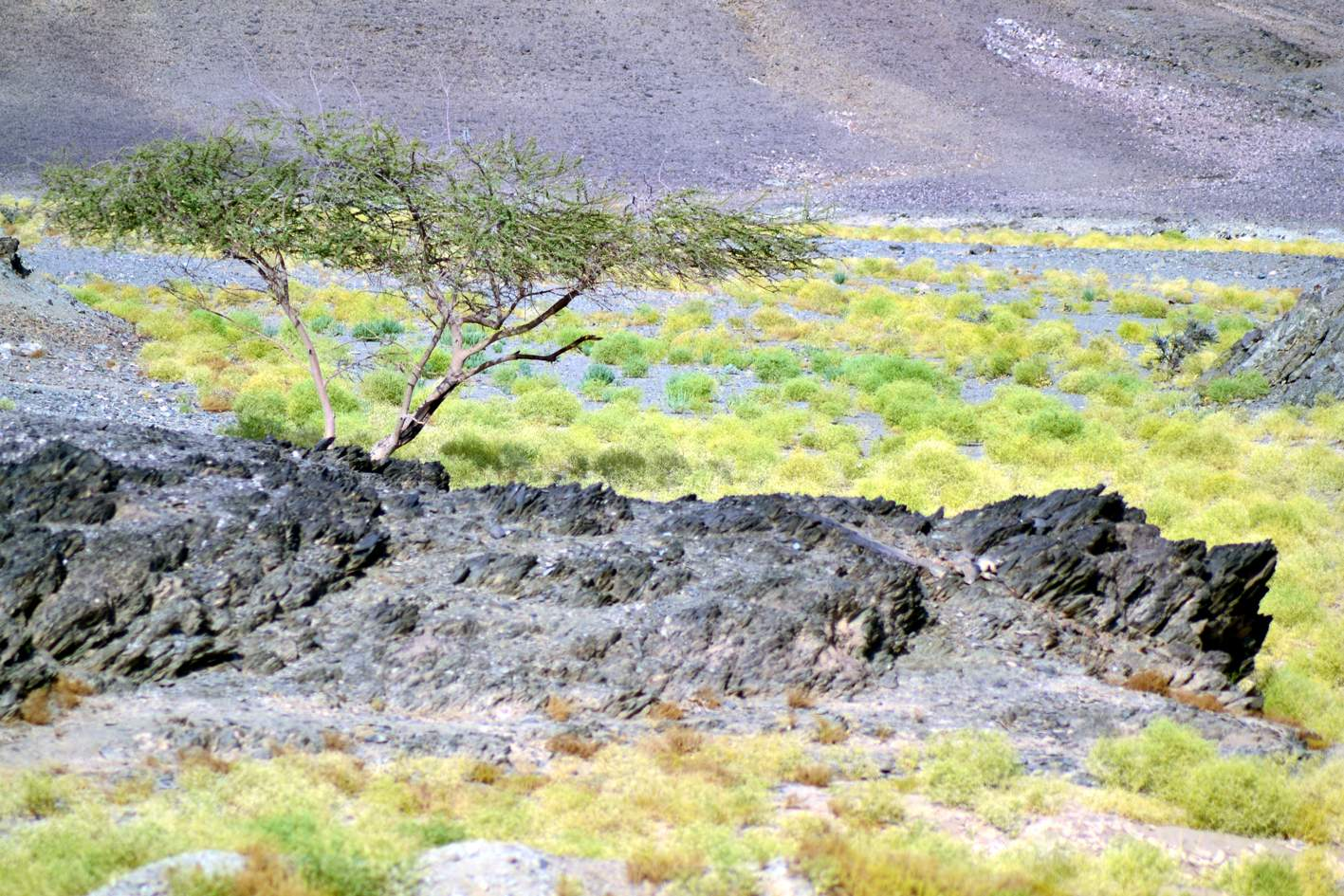
- Desert near Marsa Alam, Egypt

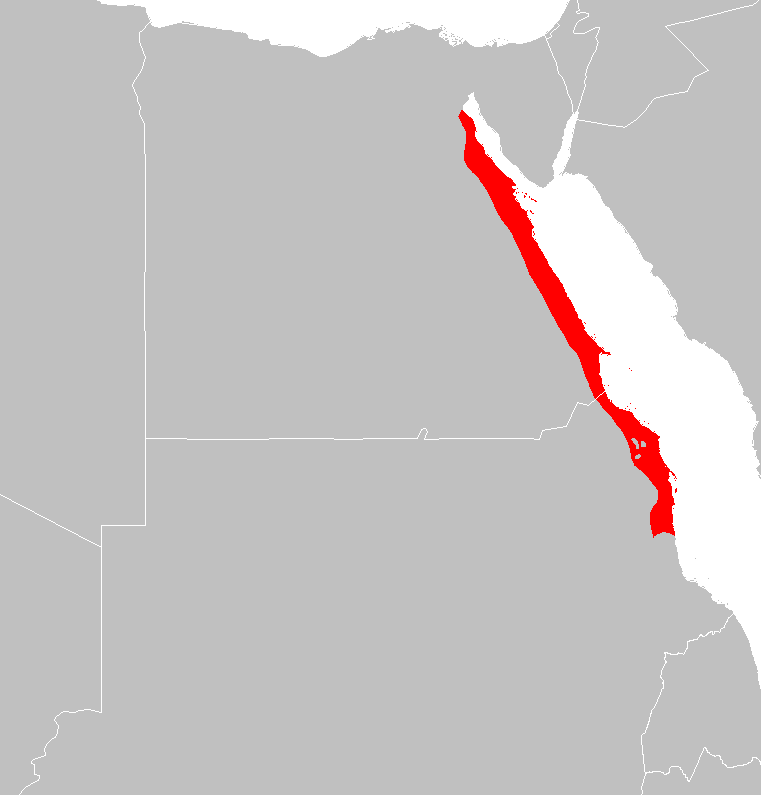
- map of the Red Sea coastal desert

Ecology
- Realm: Palearctic
- Biome: deserts and xeric shrublands

Geography
- Area: 59,300 km^{2} (22,900 mi^{2})
- Countries: Egypt; Sudan

Conservation
- Conservation status: relatively stable

The Red Sea coastal desert is deserts and xeric shrublands ecoregion of Egypt and Sudan.

== Geography ==
The Red Sea coastal desert extends north and south along the Red Sea and Gulf of Suez, which bound it on the east. It includes both a narrow coastal strip and the Red Sea Hills, a range of coastal mountains that runs parallel to the coast. The Egyptian portion is bounded on the west by the Eastern Desert, part of the hyper-arid Sahara Desert ecoregion. The Sudanese portion is bounded by the South Saharan steppe on the west, and by the Sahelian Acacia savanna to the south.

== Climate ==
Most precipitation comes in the winter months. Rainfall is as little as 3 mm along the coast. Rainfall is higher on the eastern slopes of the mountains, which intercept periodic moisture-bearing winds which create fog precipitation and occasional heavy rainstorms.

== Flora ==
Vegetation includes mangrove swamps and salt marshes along the shore, sparse shrublands along the coast, and dry woodlands in stream valleys. Lusher woodlands and shrublands occur in areas with higher rainfall and mountain mists, and along mountain streams. Jebel Elba, a mountain lying near the coast in the border region contested between Egypt and Sudan, supports the most diverse plant life in the ecoregion.

== Fauna ==
The mountains are home to the aardwolf (Proteles cristatus) endangered Nubian ibex (Capra nubiana), and Barbary sheep (Ammonotragus lervia). Other mammals include the Dorcas gazelle (Gaella dorcas), pale fox (Vulpes pallida), and rock hyrax (Procavia capensis).

== Protected areas ==
Protected areas in the ecoregion include Wadi El Gamal National Park in Egypt, and Gabal Elba National Park in the disputed Egypt–Sudan border region currently administered by Egypt.
