= Sahara Desert (ecoregion) =

Ecology of the Sahara desert

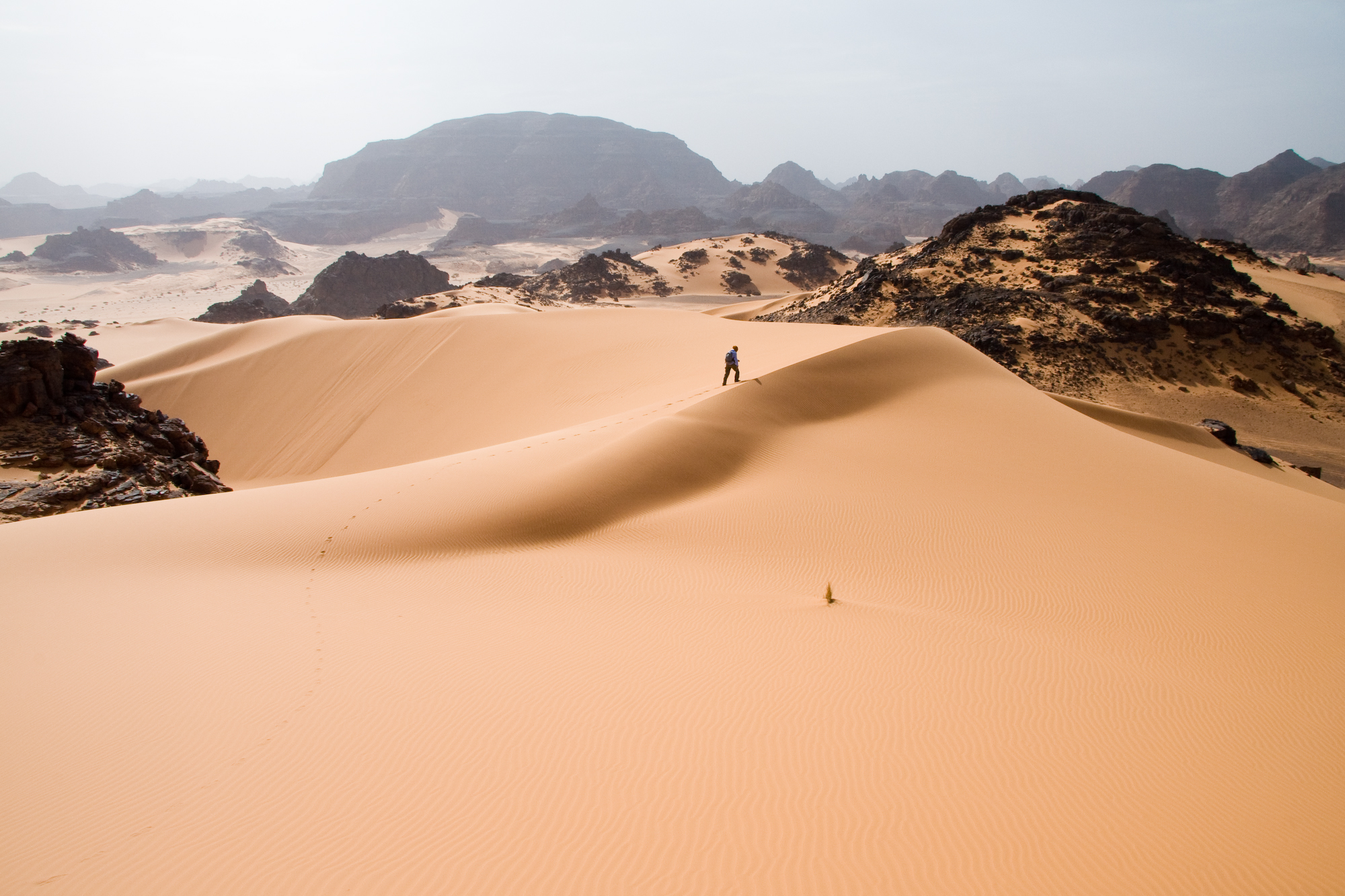
- Sand dunes in Tadrart Acacus, a desert area in western Libya

Ecology
- Realm: Palearctic
- Biome: Deserts and xeric shrublands

Geography
- Area: 4,619,260 km^{2} (1,783,510 mi^{2})
- Country: List: Morocco; Algeria; Chad; Egypt; Libya; Mali; Mauritania; Niger; Sudan
- Rivers: Nile River; intermittent rivers and streams
- Climate type: hot desert and hyper-arid

Conservation
- Conservation status: Vulnerable

The Sahara Desert, as defined by the World Wide Fund for Nature (WWF), includes the hyper-arid center of the Sahara, between latitudes 18° N and 30° N. It is one of several desert and xeric shrubland ecoregions that cover the northern portion of the Africa continent.

== Setting ==
The Sahara Desert is the world's largest hot, non-polar desert and is located in North Africa. It extends from the Atlantic Ocean in the west to the Red Sea in the east, and from the Mediterranean Sea in the north to the Sahel savanna in the south. The vast desert encompasses several ecologically distinct regions. The Sahara Desert ecoregion covers an area of 4,619,260 km^{2} (1,783,510 sq mi) in the hot, hyper-arid centre of the Sahara, surrounded on the north, south, east, and west by desert ecoregions with higher rainfall and more vegetation.

The North Saharan steppe and woodlands ecoregion lies to the north and west, bordering the Mediterranean climate regions of Africa's Mediterranean and North Atlantic coasts. The North Saharan steppe and woodlands receives more regular winter rainfall than the Sahara Desert ecoregion. The South Saharan steppe and woodlands ecoregion lies to the south, between the Sahara Desert ecoregion and the Sahel grasslands. The South Saharan steppe and woodlands receive most of their annual rainfall during the summer. The Red Sea coastal desert lies in the coastal strip between the Sahara Desert ecoregion and the Red Sea. The western portion of the region is known as El Djouf, on the border of Mauritania and Mali.

Some mountain ranges rise up from the desert and receive more rainfall and cooler temperatures. These Saharan mountains are home to two distinct ecoregions; the West Saharan montane xeric woodlands in the Ahaggar, Tassili n'Ajjer, Aïr, and other ranges in the western and central Sahara Desert and the Tibesti–Jebel Uweinat montane xeric woodlands in the Tibesti and Jebel Uweinat of the eastern Sahara.

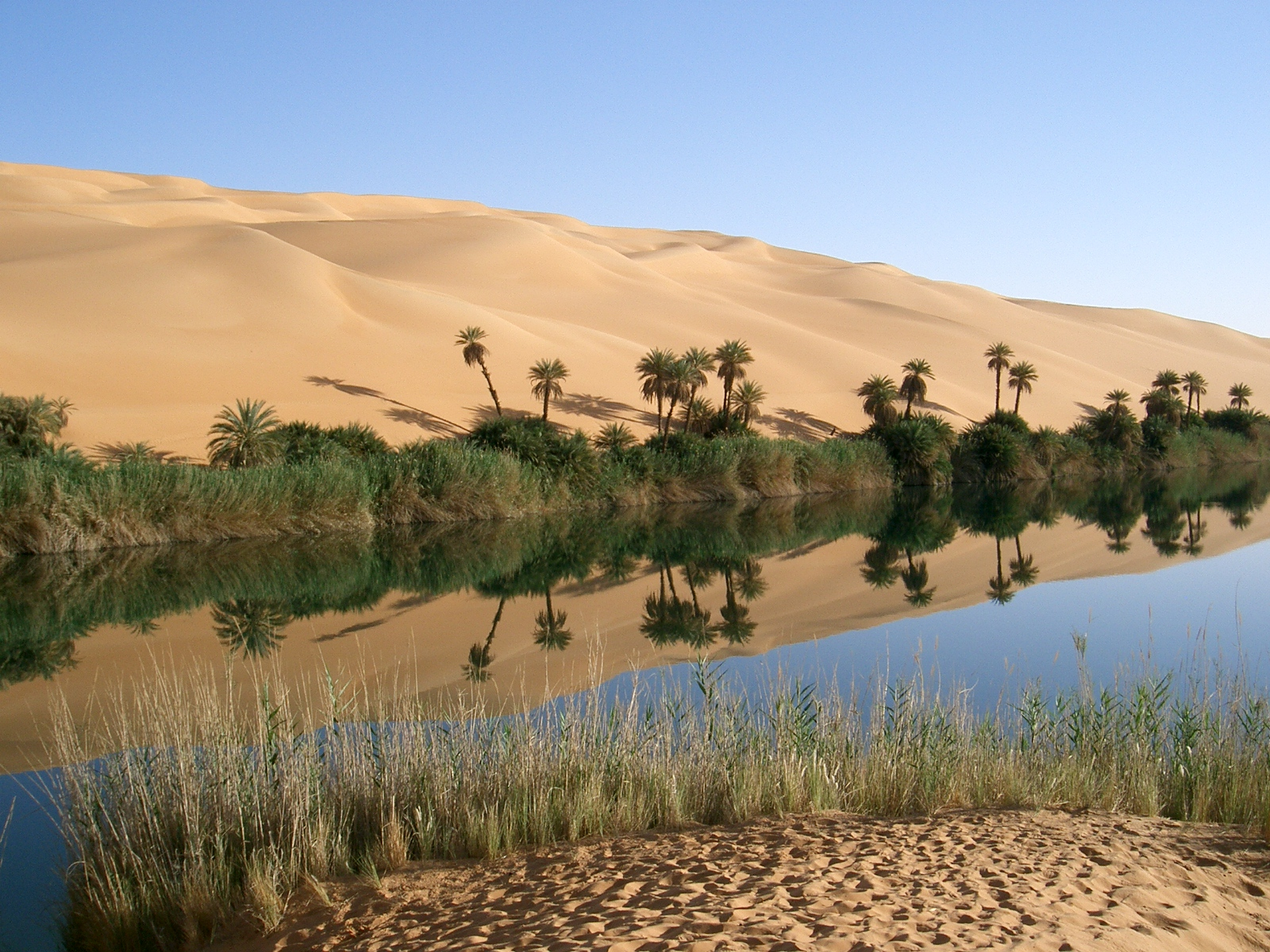
Ubari Oasis in Libya

The surface of the desert ranges from large areas of sand dunes (erg), to stone plateaus (hamadas), gravel plains (reg), dry valleys (wadis), and salt flats. The only permanent river that crosses the ecoregion is the Nile River, which originates in east Africa and empties northward into the Mediterranean Sea. Some areas encompass vast underground aquifers, resulting in oases, while other regions severely lack water reserves.

=== Climate ===
The Sahara Desert features a hot desert climate (Köppen climate classification BWh). The Sahara Desert is one of the driest and hottest regions of the world, with a mean temperature sometimes over 30 °C (86 °F) and the average high temperatures in summer are over 40 °C (104 °F) for months at a time, and can even soar to 47 °C (117 °F). In desert rocky mountains such as the Tibesti in Libya or the Hoggar in Algeria, average highs in summer are slightly moderated by the high elevation and are between 35 and 42 °C (95 and 108 °F) at 1,000 to 1,500 metres (3,300 to 4,900 ft) elevation. Daily variations may also be extreme: a swing from 37.5 to −0.5 °C (100 to 31 °F) has been observed. Typical temperature swings are between 15 and 20 °C (27 and 36 °F).

Precipitation in the Sahara Desert is scarce, as the whole desert generally receives less than 100 millimetres (3.9 in) of rain per year except on the northernmost and southernmost edges as well as in the highest desert mountains. More than half of the desert area is hyper-arid and virtually rainless, with an average annual precipitation below 50 millimetres (2.0 in) and many consecutive years may pass without any rainfall. The south of the Sahara Desert, along the boundary with the hot semi-arid climate (BSh) of the Sahel, receives most of its annual rainfall during the highest-sun months (summer) when the Intertropical Convergence Zone moves up from the south. Wind- and sandstorms occur in the early spring. Local inhabitants protect themselves from the heat, the sunshine, the dry air, the high diurnal temperature ranges, and the sometimes dusty or sandy winds by covering their heads, such as the cheche garment worn by Tuareg.

== History and conservation ==
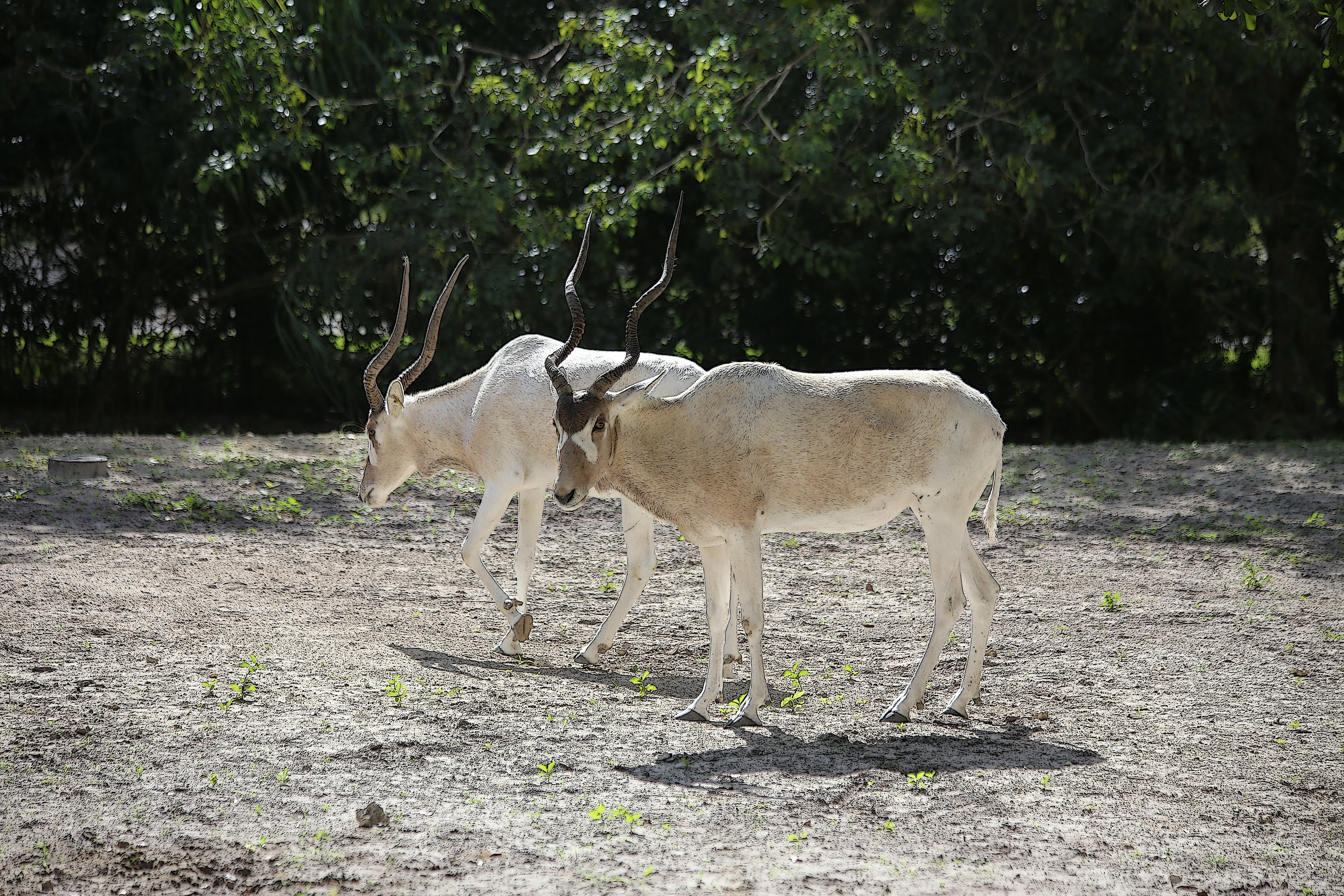
Addaxes grazing in a deserted region

The Sahara was one of the first regions of Africa to be farmed. Some 5,000 years ago, the area was not so arid and the vegetation might have been closer to a savanna. Previous fauna may be recognised in stone carvings. However, desertification set in around 3000 BC, and the area became much like it is today.

The Sahara is largely undisturbed. The most degradation is found in areas where there is water, such as aquifer oases or along the desert margins where some rain usually falls most years. In these areas, animals such as addaxes, scimitar-horned oryxes, and bustards are over-hunted for their meat. Only one area of conservation is recorded in the Sahara: the Zellaf Nature Reserve in Libya.

== Ecoregion delineation ==
In 2001, WWF devised Terrestrial Ecoregions of the World (TEOW) "a biogeographic regionalization of the Earth's terrestrial biodiversity". The 2001 regionalization divided the deserts of the Sahara into several ecoregions. The Sahara desert ecoregion included the Sahara's hyper-arid center, and the more humid Saharan mountains and southern, northern, eastern, and western deserts were separate ecoregions.

In 2017, the authors of the 2001 system proposed a revised ecoregion system for the Sahara. Two new ecoregions, the West Sahara desert and East Sahara desert, were designated in the hyper-arid center. The transitional North Saharan steppe and woodlands and South Saharan steppe and woodlands ecoregions were extended towards the central Sahara, and the South Saharan steppe and woodlands was renamed South Sahara desert.
