= Military Technical College (Egypt) =

Egyptian educational institute

- Former names: Armed Forces Technical Institute
- Motto: Faith, Work, Development
- Type: Military school
- Established: 1968
- Location: Cairo, Egypt
- Website: academy.mod.gov.eg/TechInstit.aspx

Military Technical College is an educational institution founded in 1968 in Egypt. It trains technical workers for the Egyptian Armed Forces. It was formerly called the Armed Forces Technical Institute, and was renamed the Military Technological College in 2022.

== History ==
Following the June 1967 war, the Egyptian Armed Forces initiated a period of reconstruction. The conflict highlighted the urgent need for a more effective system to train technical personnel within the military. In response, a technical institute was established to provide the Armed Forces with specialized technical officers capable of serving in various capacities, including military units, repair workshops, and educational, technical, and professional facilities. The Armed Forces Technical Institute was officially founded on November 3, 1968, starting with five educational groups. Over time, it expanded to encompass nine groups, focusing on graduating officers with the technical and practical skills necessary to fulfill specialized roles within the Armed Forces. In 2022, the institute was transformed into the Military Technological College.

== October's war ==
Studies at the Armed Forces Technical Institute commenced in October 1968, concurrent with the construction of its facilities, the development of training aids, and the preparation of instructors, all adhering to planned timelines. The institute's first class graduated in 1971, and its technical officers played in enhancing the operational efficiency of military equipment, particularly in preparation for the October 1973 war.

During this period, major workshops for the Egyptian Armed Forces were planned, constructed, and enhanced under the supervision of the Technical Authority, significantly improving their capacity to repair the rapidly expanding inventory of military equipment. Among these were the radar and missile workshops, established within a year.

The establishment and reinforcement of workshops covering various military specialties had an impact on the overall technical efficiency of the Armed Forces across all sectors, playing a critical role in preparing for the October 1973 war. The Technical Authority also oversaw the systematic planning and supply of spare parts, ensuring the Armed Forces were adequately prepared for the battle. Furthermore, the authority's supervision of technical research led to the development and modernization of military equipment.

One notable example of the advancements achieved under the Technical Authority was the development and local production of the corridor bomb. This weapon, manufactured in domestic factories, was employed during the October War.

== Specialties ==
Students at the Military Technical College specialize in seven core disciplines:

== Education ==
A student at the Military Technical College graduates with the rank of probationary lieutenant after completing three years of study. Upon passing a six-month applied training program held at the college following graduation, the student is awarded a specialized technical diploma.

== Study system ==
- The duration of study at the institute is two academic years, which are preceded by a qualifying year at the institute's training center.
- The academic qualifying year is divided into two semesters and concludes with an examination, which determines whether a student can progress to the next academic year.
- The school day consists of eight hours of daytime study and four hours of nighttime study, with instructors present to oversee the students.
- The total number of study hours required to obtain a diploma from the Technical Institute is 5,268, distributed as follows:
  - Military Science: 1,514 hours (28.75%)
  - Mathematical and Engineering Sciences: 2,504 hours (48.75%)
  - English: 364 hours (6.91%)
  - Computer Studies: 296 hours (5.62%)
  - Practicum: 590 hours (9.97%)

=== Admission requirements for the Military Technical College ===
- The applicant should be native Egyptian as well as his parents and grandparents.
  - The applicant with high school diplomas (general, Azhari, or industrial) must be 21 years old to enroll in the institute.
  - The applicant enrolled in studies beyond the previously mentioned degrees must be 24 years old to apply to the Armed Forces Technical Institute.
- The applicant must be unmarried and will not get married during the years of studying.
- Educational qualification:
  - Holders of a high school diploma in the scientific section, specifically in the science or mathematics divisions, are eligible to apply, provided that their curriculum does not include literary subjects and includes at least one of the following subjects: mathematics or physics.
  - Holders of the Al-Azhar secondary school certificate in the scientific section are also eligible to apply.
  - Holders of industrial high school diplomas from a three- or five-year system, obtained from schools affiliated with the Ministry of Education or the Don Bosco Institute (Italian Salesian), are eligible to apply, provided that their specializations fall within the mechanical or electrical departments specified later.
  - Individuals enrolled in higher studies beyond the previously mentioned degrees may also apply, provided that their studies are relevant to the context of engineering, technology, or technical fields. If accepted, they must meet the conditions applicable to each degree and fulfill the age requirement to enroll in the Military Technical College.
  - Applicants must have obtained their high school diploma (General Secondary School, Al-Azhar Secondary School, or Industrial Secondary School with a three- or five-year system in mechanical or electrical sections) no more than one year prior to applying.
  - If more than one year has passed since the applicants obtained one of the aforementioned certificates, the applicants must be enrolled in a university college or an industrial or technological technical institute affiliated with the Ministry of Higher Education that supports technical studies at the Armed Forces Technical Institute. Additionally, the applicants must provide proof of their enrollment.
  - The applicant must successfully pass the admission and self-confidence tests mandated by the institute.

=== Divisions and specializations accepted at the Military Technical College ===
- High School: Science or Mathematics
- The curriculum requires students to complete either Mathematics 1 or Mathematics 2, in addition to Physics.
- Compulsory subjects must not include literary subjects, as these are reserved for students in the literary science stream.
- Al-Azhar High School (Scientific)
- Industrial High School (three/five year program):

Industrial High School Three/Five-Year Program:
Electrical Specialties	Mechanical Specialties	
Computers	Mechanical engineering	Production technology
Electrical engineering	Maintenance and repair mechanics	Tractors and agricultural machinery
Electronics engineering	Mechanical fittings	Heavy equipment
Repair and maintenance of electrical equipment	Blacksmith	Transportation and lifting equipment
Electrical networks	Metal forming	Agricultural mechanization
Electrical measuring devices	Filings	Fine minerals
Electrical appliances	Cartridge	Drawing and design
Elevator maintenance	Machining	Ground transportation
Transportation and distribution	Soldering	Marine transportation
Industrial systems	Tractors	River navigation
Counters	Cars	River transport
TV	Zincography Printing	Printing
Industrial electronics	Ship engines	Diesel and heavy equipment
Appliance electrician	Refrigeration and air conditioning	Marine engineering
Medical device maintenance	Thermal coefficients	Hydraulics
Graduates of Ismailia's Advanced Experimental Technical School for Information Technology	Metal plumbing	Ship automation and operation
	Precision devices	Run the machine
	Power plants	Offset printing
	Crafts	silk screen printing
	Industrial chemistry	Fisheries, navigation and maritime arts* Shipbuilding

- Enrolled in studies higher than the mentioned degrees (The student must be enrolled in an educational institution under the full supervision of the Ministry of Higher Education)
  - Engineering faculties
  - Institutes of technology
  - Faculties of education
  - Industrial Technician Training Institutes
  - Complementary studies

Note: Specializations are limited to the Mechanical and Electrical Departments only.

== Commandants ==
- Major general military staff: Akram Salah Al-Din
- Major general military staff: Hossam Al-Din Moustafa
- Major general military staff: Alaa Ibrahim Makhlouf
- Major general military staff: Hesham Nasr Mahmoud
- Major general military staff: Moustafa Abd Al-Wahab
- Major general military staff: Alaa Al Din Fahmy
- Major general military staff: Mohamed Khalid Abd Al Motalib
- Major general military staff: Fayez Agour
- Major general military staff: Mamdouh Morsy
- Major general military staff: Hassan Hussein A'azo
