= Wadi El Gemal National Park =

National park and protected area in Egypt

Coordinates: 24.352101°N 35.048675°E

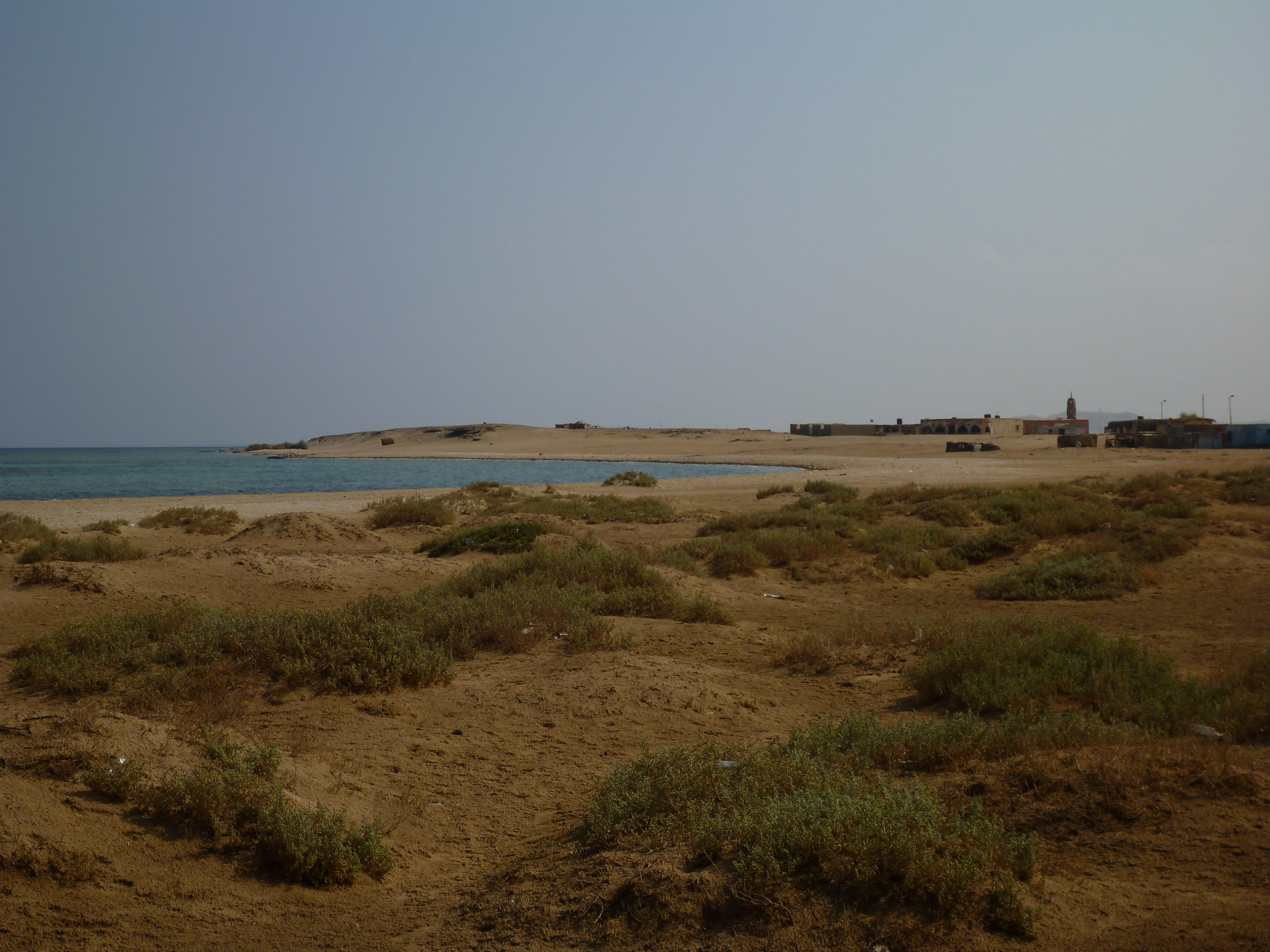
- A Red Sea beach at Wadi el Gemal

- Location within Egypt
- Area: 4,770 km^{2} (1,840 sq mi)
- Established: 2003

Wadi El Gemal National Park is a national park in Egypt. It is 7,450 square kilometres (2,880 sq mi) in size, including 4,770 square kilometres (1,840 sq mi) of land and 2,100 square kilometres (810 sq mi) of marine space.

The coastal area boasts rich coral reefs featuring 450 species of coral, plentiful cnidarians, giant clams, sponges, crustaceans and more. Additionally, there are over 1200 species of fish, including the blue-spotted fantail ray, emperor angelfish, giant moray, parrotfish, redmouth grouper, Red Sea bannerfish and clearfin lionfish, Sohal surgeonfish, surge wrasse, white-spotted puffer and the yellowmargin triggerfish. Around one-fifth of the marine life is native to the region and greater Red Sea. It also includes five islands, including Wadi El Gemal Island. These islands are a breeding ground for several bird species, including African spoonbill, Caspian tern, desert wheatear, striated heron and the western reef heron. The beds of sea grass are important sources of food for the endangered dugong and green turtle.

The coast of Wadi el Gemal is semi-rocky, mostly coarse to medium-grained sand, with several sections dominated by mangroves. The mangrove habitats are particularly widespread in the south of the park, where one may find the largest mangrove forest of the entire Red Sea.

The inland area is home to many desert-specialised species, including mammals like the aoudad (or Barbary sheep), Dorcas gazelle, jerboa and the Nubian Ibex.

The park is the site of prehistoric rock art, as well as Ptolemaic and Roman ruins; Mons Smaragdus is the site of small mining communities, dating back to ancient Egypt.

Wadi El Gemal is an IUCN Category II park, established in 2003.
