= Mesehti =

Ancient Egyptian nomarch

- Nomarch of the 13th nome of Upper Egypt
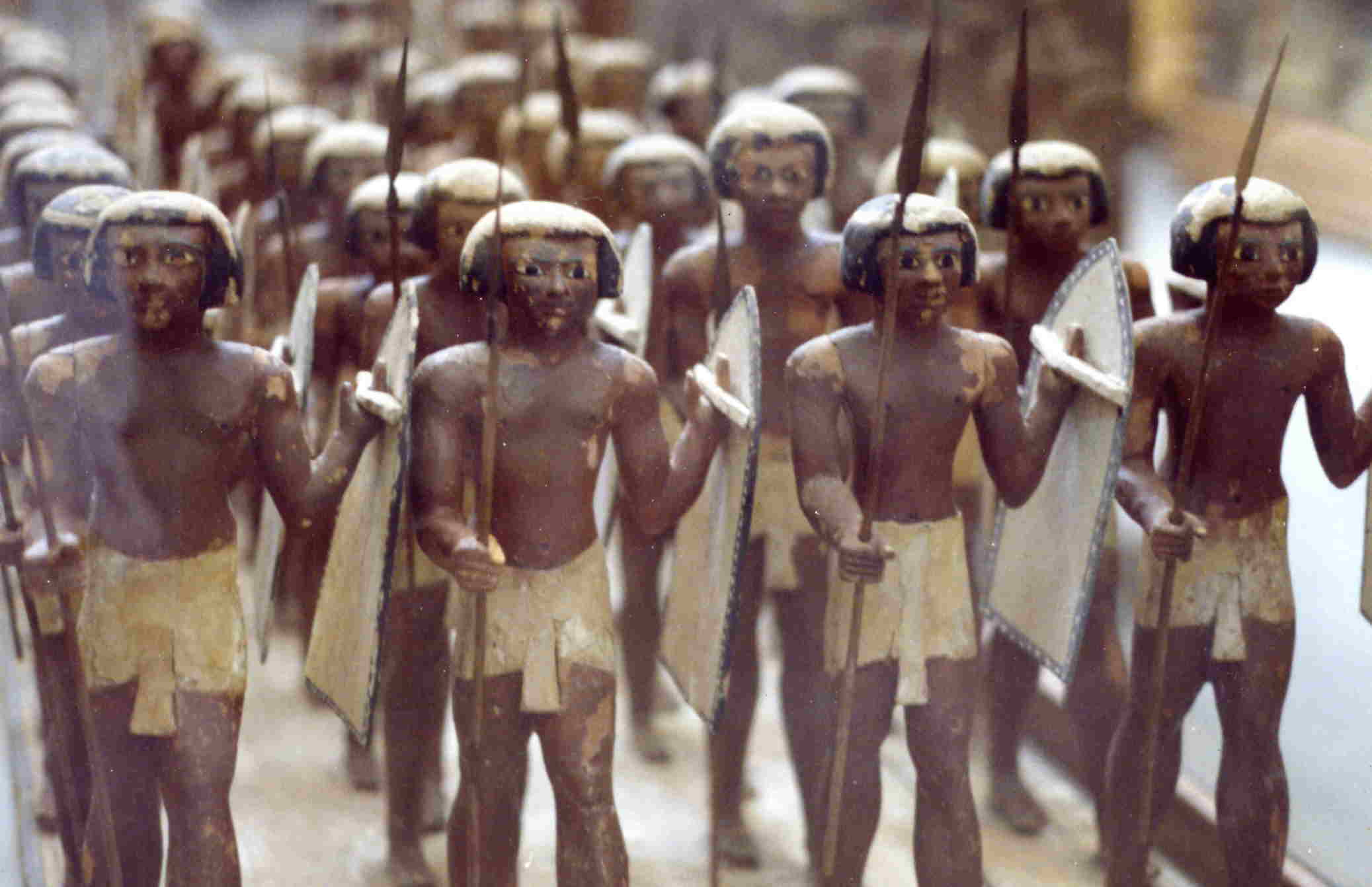
- Models of Egyptian spearmen from the tomb of Mesehti at Asyut. Cairo Museum.
Egyptian name
m z H t i
- Dynasty: 11th dynasty
- Burial: Asyut

Mesehti was an ancient Egyptian nomarch of the 13th nome of Upper Egypt ("the Upper Sycamore") around 2000 BCE, during the 11th Dynasty. He also was seal-bearer and overseer of the priests of Wepwawet.

== Tomb ==
Mesehti is well known for his funerary equipment, found in Asyut at the end of the 19th century during an illegal excavation. The contents of the tomb, which at the time of the discovery appeared undisturbed, were mainly sold to the Egyptian Museum in Cairo. They are now on display in the Grand Egyptian Museum in Giza.

Among the objects of the funerary equipment, the most famous are the wooden models of soldiers: a group of striding Egyptian spearmen equipped with a hide shield and a white skirt, and another group composed of 40 striding nubian archers, darker-skinned and wearing a red loincloth.
The tomb also contained two large wooden coffins whose interior is richly decorated with Coffin Texts; these coffins are among the main sources for this type of religious texts, which were much used during the First Intermediate Period and the Middle Kingdom.

== Bibliography ==
- Michael Rice, Who is who in Ancient Egypt, 1999 (2004), p. 115. Routledge, London, ISBN 0-203-44328-4.
