= South Saharan steppe and woodlands =

South Sahara Desert ecoregion

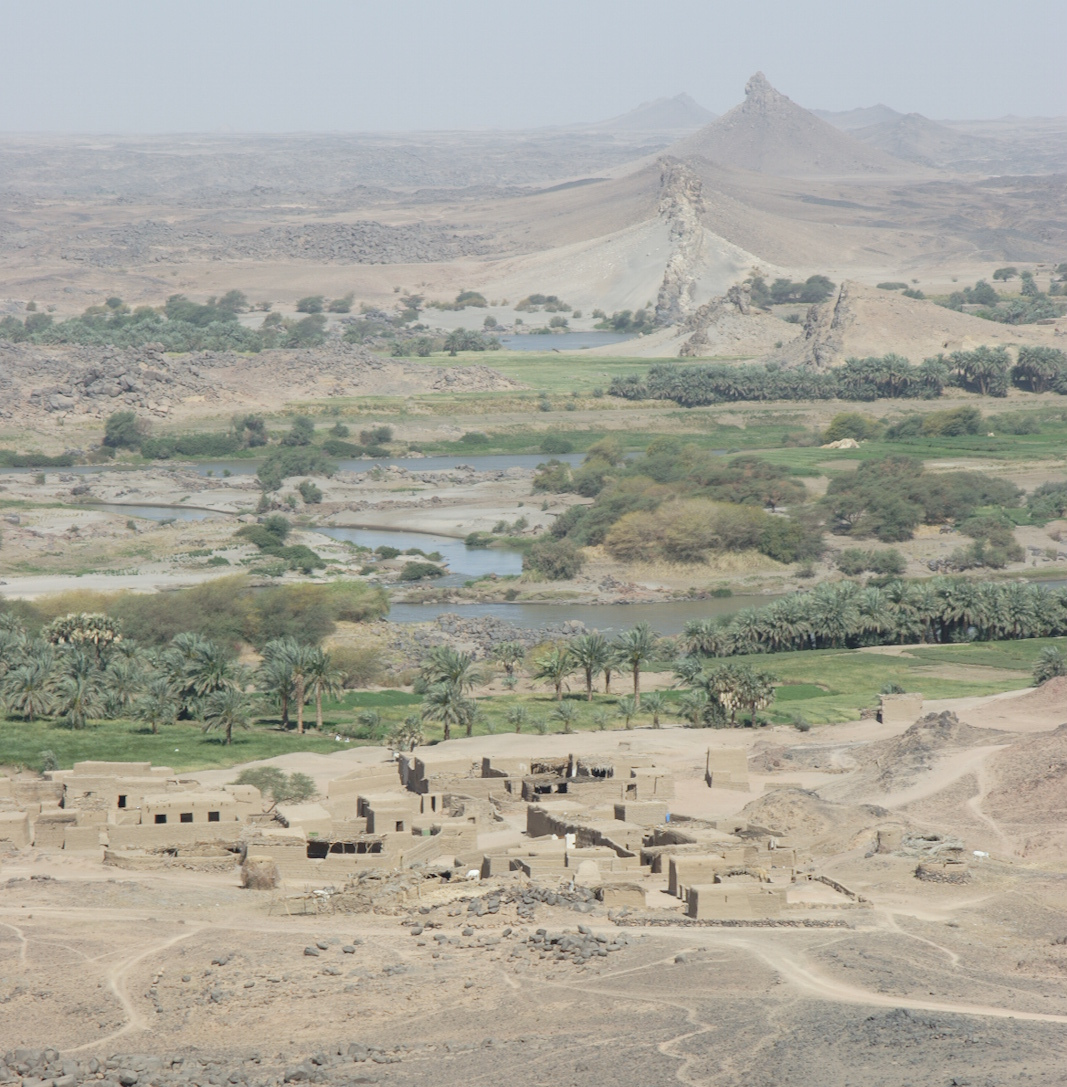
- Dar al-Manasir, Sudan

- Map of the South Saharan steppe and woodlands

Ecology
- Realm: Palearctic
- Biome: Deserts and xeric shrublands

Geography
- Area: 1,101,700 km^{2} (425,400 mi^{2})
- Countries: List: Algeria; Chad; Mali; Mauritania; Niger; Sudan

Conservation
- Conservation status: relatively intact

The South Saharan steppe and woodlands, also known as the South Sahara Desert, is a deserts and xeric shrublands ecoregion of northern Africa. This band is a transitional region between the Sahara's very arid center (the Sahara Desert ecoregion) to the north, and the wetter Sahelian Acacia savanna ecoregion to the south. In pre-modern times, the grasslands were grazed by migratory gazelles and other ungulates after the rainfalls. More recently, over-grazing by domestic livestock have degraded the territory. Despite the name of the ecoregion, there are few 'woodlands' in the area; those that exist are generally acacia and shrubs along rivers and in wadis.

== Location and description ==
The ecoregion covers 1,101,700 square kilometers (425,400 sq mi) in Algeria, Chad, Mali, Mauritania, Niger, and Sudan. It extends east and west across the continent in a band, forming a transition between the hyper-arid Sahara Desert to the north and the Sahel grasslands and savannas to the south.

== Climate ==
The climate of the ecoregion is Hot semi-arid climate (Köppen climate classification (BSh)). This climate is characteristic of steppes, with hot summers and cool or mild winters, and minimal precipitation. The coldest month averages above 0 °C (32 °F). Movements of the equatorial Intertropical Convergence Zone (ITCZ) bring summer rains during July and August which average 100 to 200 mm, but vary greatly from year to year. These rains sustain summer pastures of grasses and herbs, with dry woodlands and shrublands along seasonal watercourses.

== Flora and fauna ==
Almost 99% of the region is bare ground or sparse vegetation that is dependent on uncertain rainfall. The grasses are typically canegrass (Eragrostis), needlegrasses (Aristida), and species of genus Stipagrostis. The herbs include (Tribulus), (Heliotropium), and (Pulicaria). Characteristic tree species are the umbrella thorn acacia (Acacia tortilis), salam (Acacia ehrenbergiana), Egyptian balsam (Balanites aegyptiaca), and (Maerua crassifolia). Along the southern edge are steppes featuring clumps of bunchgrass (Panicum turgidum).

Most of the animals of the region have been reduced to small populations, including the critically endangered addax (also known as the white antelope) (Addax nasomaculatus), the endangered slender-horned gazelle (Gazella leptoceros), the vulnerable Dorcas gazelle (Gazella dorcas), the critically endangered dama gazelle (Gazella dama), the near threatened striped hyena (Hyaena hyaena), the vulnerable cheetah (Acinonyx jubatus), the endangered wild dog (Lycaon pictus), and the ostrich (Struthio camelus).

== Ecoregion delineation ==
In 2001, WWF devised Terrestrial Ecoregions of the World (TEOW) "a biogeographic regionalization of the Earth's terrestrial biodiversity". The 2001 regionalization divided the deserts of the Sahara into several ecoregions. The South Saharan steppe and woodlands ecoregion included the transitional region between the Sahelian Acacia savanna and the Sahara's hyper-arid center, designated the Sahara Desert ecoregion.

In 2017, the authors of the 2001 system proposed a revised ecoregion system for the Sahara. The South Saharan steppe and woodlands ecoregion was extended into the central Sahara, and renamed South Sahara Desert. Two new ecoregions, the West Sahara Desert and East Sahara Desert, were designated in the hyper-arid center.

== Protected areas ==
Approximately 11% of the ecoregion is officially protected in some form. These include:

- Aïr and Ténéré National Nature Reserve, in Niger.
- Ouadi Rimé-Ouadi Achim Faunal Reserve, in Chad.
