= Outline of Serbia =

Landlocked country in Southeastern Europe

The Flag of Serbia

The Coat of arms of Serbia

The following outline is provided as an overview of and topical guide to Serbia:

Serbia – landlocked sovereign country located in Southeastern Europe and comprising the southern portion of the Pannonian Plain and a central portion of the Balkan Peninsula. Serbia is bordered by Hungary to the north; Romania and Bulgaria to the east; North Macedonia and constitutionally only, Albania (via Kosovo, a disputed territory over which Serbia has no control, thus no direct access to Albania) to the south; and Croatia, Bosnia and Herzegovina and Montenegro to the west. The capital of Serbia is Belgrade.

For centuries, shaped at cultural boundaries between East and West, a powerful medieval kingdom – later renamed the Serbian Empire – occupied much of the Balkans. Torn by domestic feuds, Ottoman, Hungarian, and later, Austrian incursions, the Serbian state collapsed by the mid-16th century. The positive outcome of the Serbian revolution in 1817 marked the birth of modern Serbia. Within a century it reacquired Kosovo, Raška and Vardar Macedonia from the Ottoman Empire. Likewise, in 1918 the former autonomous Habsburg crownland of Vojvodina proclaimed its secession from Austria-Hungary to unite with Serbia, preceded by the Syrmia region.

The current borders of the country were established following the end of World War II, when Serbia became a federal unit within the Socialist Federal Republic of Yugoslavia. Serbia became an independent state again in 2006, after Montenegro left the union that formed after the dissolution of Yugoslavia in 1990s.

In February 2008, the parliament of Kosovo unilaterally declared independence from Serbia. Serbia's government, as well as the UN Security Council, have not recognized Kosovo's independence. The response from the international community has been mixed. Serbia is a member of the United Nations, the Organization for Security and Co-operation in Europe, and the Council of Europe, and is an associate member of the European Union.

== General reference ==
- Pronunciation: Serbia /ˈsɜːrbiə/, officially the Republic of Serbia (Serbian: Република Србија / Republika Srbija, pronounced [rɛpǔblika sř̩bija])
- Common English country name: Serbia
- Official English country name: The Republic of Serbia
- Common endonym(s): Srbija – Србија
- Official endonym(s): Republika Srbija – Република Србија
- Adjectival(s): Serbian
- Demonym(s): Serbs, Serbians
- Etymology: Name of Serbia
- International rankings of Serbia
- ISO country codes: RS, SRB, 688
- ISO region codes: See ISO 3166-2:RS
- Internet country code top-level domain: .rs

== Geography of Serbia ==
Geography of Serbia

- Serbia is: a sovereign state; a landlocked country
- Location:
  - Eastern Hemisphere
  - Northern Hemisphere
    - Eurasia
      - Europe
        - Southern Europe
          - Balkans (also known as "Southeastern Europe")
  - Time zone: Central European Time (UTC+01), Central European Summer Time (UTC+02)
  - Extreme points of Serbia
    - High: Velika Rudoka 2,658 m (8,720 ft)
    - Low: Iron Gate 28 m (92 ft)
  - Land boundaries: 2,026 km (1258 mi)

Romania 476 km (295 mi)
Bulgaria 318 km (197 mi)
Bosnia and Herzegovina 302 km (187 mi)
Croatia 241 km (149 mi)
Hungary 151 km (93 mi)
Montenegro 203 km (126 mi)
North Macedonia 221 km (137 mi)

- Coastline: none

- Population of Serbia: 8,205,168 (January 1, 2024, including Kosovo. Without Kosovo, the population stands at 6,605,168) - 81st most populous country
- Area of Serbia: 88 361 km^{2}
- Atlas of Serbia

=== Environment of Serbia ===
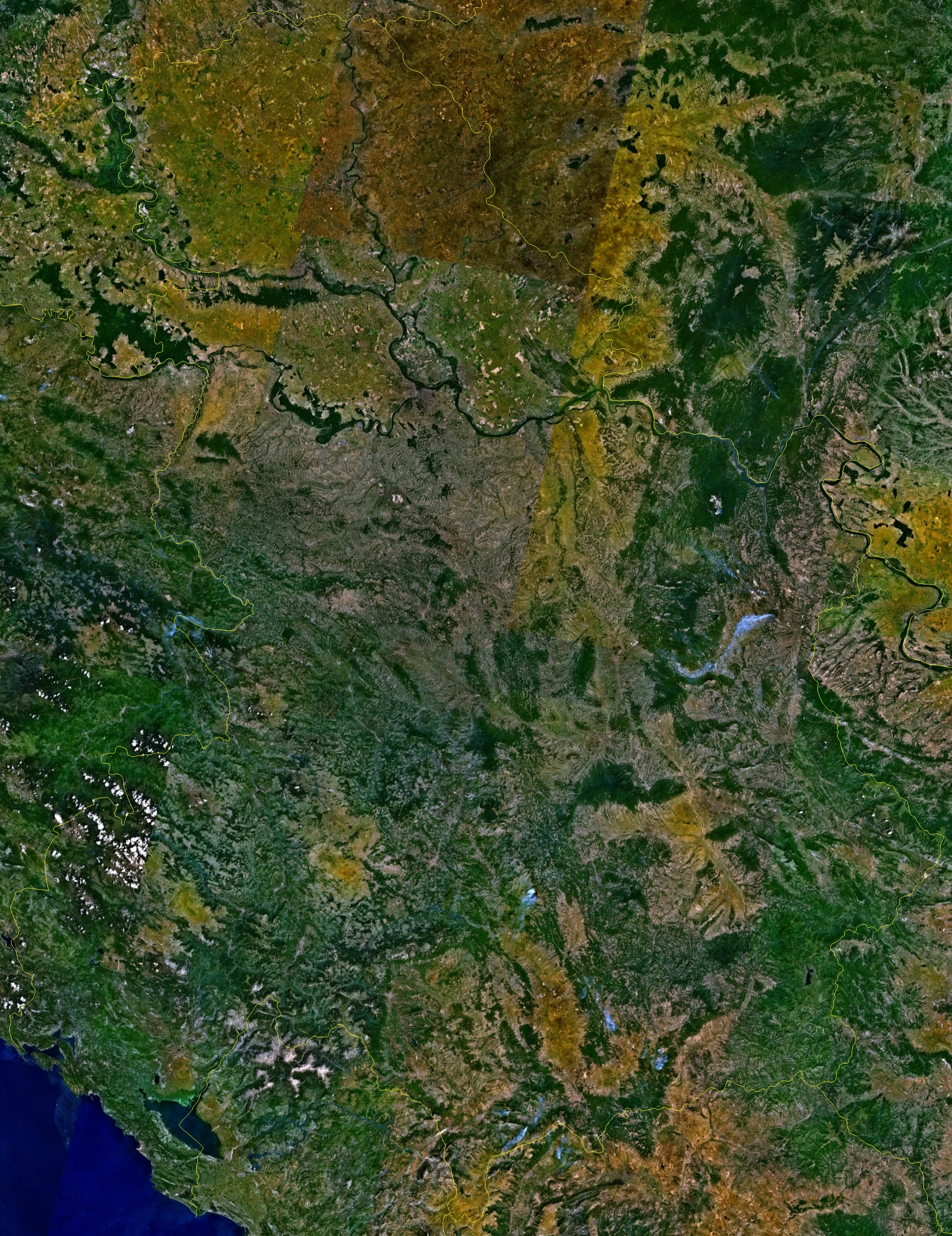
An enlargeable satellite image of Serbia

- Climate of Serbia
- Environmental issues in Serbia
- Ecoregions in Serbia
- Ecology of Serbia
  - Renewable energy in Serbia
- Geology of Serbia
- Protected areas of Serbia
  - Biosphere reserves in Serbia
  - National parks of Serbia
- Wildlife of Serbia
  - Flora of Serbia
  - Fauna of Serbia
    - Birds of Serbia
    - Mammals of Serbia

=== Natural geographic features of Serbia ===
- Glaciers of Serbia
- Islands of Serbia
- Lakes of Serbia
- Mountains of Serbia
- Hills of Serbia
  - Hills in Belgrade
- Rivers of Serbia
  - Waterfalls of Serbia
- Valleys of Serbia
- World Heritage Sites in Serbia

=== Regions of Serbia ===
Regions of Serbia

=== Ecoregions of Serbia ===
List of ecoregions in Serbia

- Ecoregions in Serbia

=== Administrative divisions of Serbia ===
Administrative divisions of Serbia

- Districts of Serbia
  - Municipalities of Serbia

=== Districts of Serbia ===
Districts of Serbia

Vojvodina
- Central Banat
- North Bačka
- North Banat
- South Bačka
- South Banat
- Srem
- West Bačka
Central Serbia
- Bor
- City of Belgrade
- Braničevo
- Jablanica
- Kolubara
- Mačva
- Moravica
- Nišava
- Pčinja
- Pirot
- Podunavlje
- Pomoravlje
- Rasina
- Raška
- Šumadija
- Toplica
- Zaječar
- Zlatibor

==== Disputed ====
Kosovo and Metohija
- Kosovo
- Kosovo-Pomoravlje
- Kosovska Mitrovica
- Peć
- Prizren

=== Municipalities of Serbia ===
Municipalities of Serbia

- Capital of Serbia: Belgrade
- Cities of Serbia

=== Demography of Serbia ===
Demographics of Serbia

== Government and politics of Serbia ==
Politics of Serbia

- Form of government:
- Capital of Serbia: Belgrade
- Elections in Serbia
- Political parties in Serbia

=== Branches of the government of Serbia ===
Government of Serbia

==== Executive branch of the government of Serbia ====
- Head of state: President of Serbia, Aleksandar Vučić
- Head of government: Prime Minister of Serbia, Đuro Macut
- Cabinet of Serbia

==== Legislative branch of the government of Serbia ====
- Parliament of Serbia (unicameral)

==== Judicial branch of the government of Serbia ====
- Court system of Serbia
- Supreme Court of Serbia

=== Foreign relations of Serbia ===
Foreign relations of Serbia

- Diplomatic missions in Serbia
- Diplomatic missions of Serbia

==== International organization membership ====
The Republic of Serbia is a member of:

- Black Sea Economic Cooperation Zone (BSEC)
- Central European Initiative (CEI)
- Council of Europe (CE)
- Euro-Atlantic Partnership Council (EAPC)
- European Bank for Reconstruction and Development (EBRD)
- European Organization for Nuclear Research (CERN)
- Food and Agriculture Organization (FAO)
- International Atomic Energy Agency (IAEA)
- International Bank for Reconstruction and Development (IBRD)
- International Chamber of Commerce (ICC)
- International Civil Aviation Organization (ICAO)
- International Criminal Court (ICCt)
- International Criminal Police Organization (Interpol)
- International Development Association (IDA)
- International Federation of Red Cross and Red Crescent Societies (IFRCS)
- International Finance Corporation (IFC)
- International Fund for Agricultural Development (IFAD) (suspended)
- International Hydrographic Organization (IHO)
- International Labour Organization (ILO)
- International Maritime Organization (IMO)
- International Mobile Satellite Organization (IMSO)
- International Monetary Fund (IMF)
- International Olympic Committee (IOC)
- International Organization for Migration (IOM)
- International Organization for Standardization (ISO)
- International Red Cross and Red Crescent Movement (ICRM)
- International Telecommunication Union (ITU)
- International Telecommunications Satellite Organization (ITSO)
- International Trade Union Confederation (ITUC)
- Inter-Parliamentary Union (IPU)
- Multilateral Investment Guarantee Agency (MIGA)
- Nonaligned Movement (NAM) (observer)
- Organisation internationale de la Francophonie (OIF) (observer)
- Organization for Security and Cooperation in Europe (OSCE)
- Organisation for the Prohibition of Chemical Weapons (OPCW)
- Organization of American States (OAS) (observer)
- Partnership for Peace (PFP)
- Permanent Court of Arbitration (PCA)
- Southeast European Cooperative Initiative (SECI)
- United Nations (UN)
- United Nations Conference on Trade and Development (UNCTAD)
- United Nations Educational, Scientific, and Cultural Organization (UNESCO)
- United Nations High Commissioner for Refugees (UNHCR)
- United Nations Industrial Development Organization (UNIDO)
- United Nations Mission in Liberia (UNMIL)
- United Nations Operation in Cote d'Ivoire (UNOCI)
- United Nations Organization Mission in the Democratic Republic of the Congo (MONUC)
- Universal Postal Union (UPU)
- World Confederation of Labour (WCL)
- World Customs Organization (WCO)
- World Federation of Trade Unions (WFTU)
- World Health Organization (WHO)
- World Intellectual Property Organization (WIPO)
- World Meteorological Organization (WMO)
- World Tourism Organization (UNWTO)
- World Trade Organization (WTO) (observer)
- World Veterans Federation

=== Law and order in Serbia ===
Law of Serbia

- Capital punishment in Serbia
- Constitution of Serbia
- Crime in Serbia
- Human rights in Serbia
  - LGBT rights in Serbia
  - Freedom of religion in Serbia
- Law enforcement in Serbia
- Terrorism in Serbia

=== Military of Serbia ===
Military of Serbia

- Command
  - Commander-in-chief:
    - Ministry of Defence of Serbia
- Forces
  - Army of Serbia
  - Navy of Serbia: None
  - Air Force of Serbia
  - Special forces of Serbia
- Military history of Serbia
- Military ranks of Serbia'
- List of military conflicts involving Serbia

=== Local government in Serbia ===
Local government in Serbia

== History of Serbia ==
- Military history of Serbia
- Legal history of Serbia
- Political history of Serbia
- Economical history of Serbia
- Serbia in the Middle Ages
- History of Ottoman Serbia
- History of Serbia (1804–1918)
- History of Serbia since 1918

== Culture of Serbia ==
Culture of Serbia

- Architecture of Serbia
- Cuisine of Serbia
- Festivals in Serbia
- Languages of Serbia
- Media in Serbia
- National symbols of Serbia
  - Coat of arms of Serbia
  - Flag of Serbia
  - National anthem of Serbia
- People of Serbia
- Prostitution in Serbia
- Public holidays in Serbia
- Records of Serbia
- Religion in Serbia
  - Christianity in Serbia
  - Hinduism in Serbia
  - Islam in Serbia
  - Judaism in Serbia
  - Sikhism in Serbia
- World Heritage Sites in Serbia

=== Art in Serbia ===
- Art in Serbia
- Cinema of Serbia
- Literature of Serbia
- Music of Serbia
- Television in Serbia
- Theatre in Serbia

=== Sports in Serbia ===
Sports in Serbia

- Football in Serbia
- Serbia at the Olympics

== Economy and infrastructure of Serbia ==
Economy of Serbia

- Economic rank, by nominal GDP (2007): 71st (seventy-first)
- Agriculture in Serbia
- Banking in Serbia
  - National Bank of Serbia
- Communications in Serbia
  - Internet in Serbia
- Companies of Serbia
- Currency of Serbia: Dinar
  - ISO 4217: RSD
- Energy in Serbia
  - Energy policy of Serbia
  - Oil industry in Serbia
- Health care in Serbia
- Mining in Serbia
- Serbia Stock Exchange
- Tourism in Serbia
- Transport in Serbia
  - Airports in Serbia
  - Rail transport in Serbia
  - Roads in Serbia
- Water supply and sanitation in Serbia

== Education in Serbia ==
Education in Serbia

== Science in Serbia ==
- Astronomy in Serbia

== See also ==
Serbia

- Index of Serbia-related articles
- List of international rankings
- Member state of the United Nations
- Outline of Europe
- Outline of Kosovo
- Outline of geography
