= Early modern history of Serbia =

History of Serbia from second half of 15th century to 1804

Early modern history of Serbia refers to the history of Serbia during the early modern period, from the Ottoman conquest in the second half of 15th century up to the beginning of the Serbian Revolution in 1804. The era includes periods of Ottoman and Habsburg rule in various parts of Serbia. During that time, several Habsburg–Ottoman wars were fought on the territory of Serbia.

== Between Habsburgs and Ottomans ==
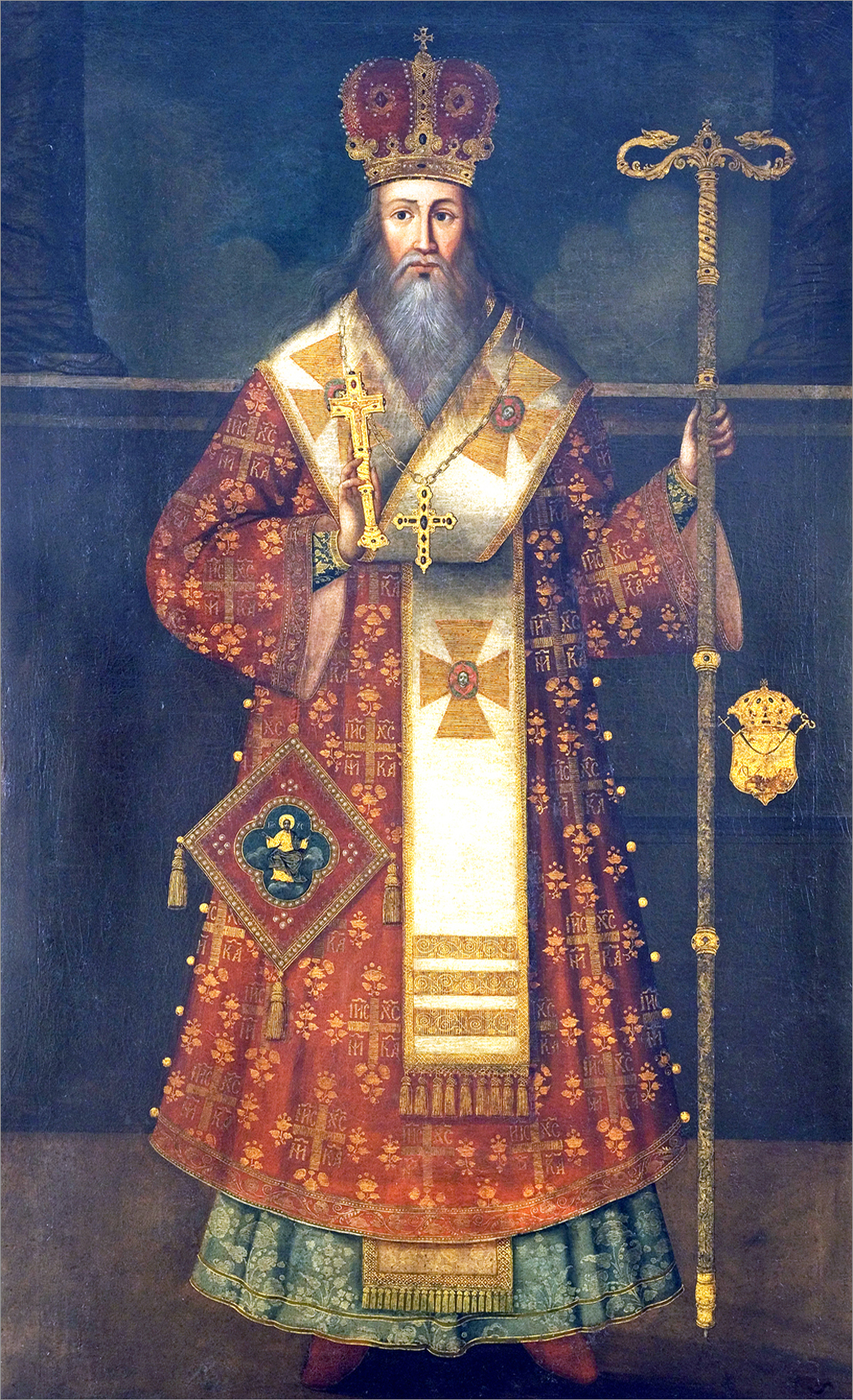
Serbian Patriarch Arsenije III Crnojević (d. 1706)

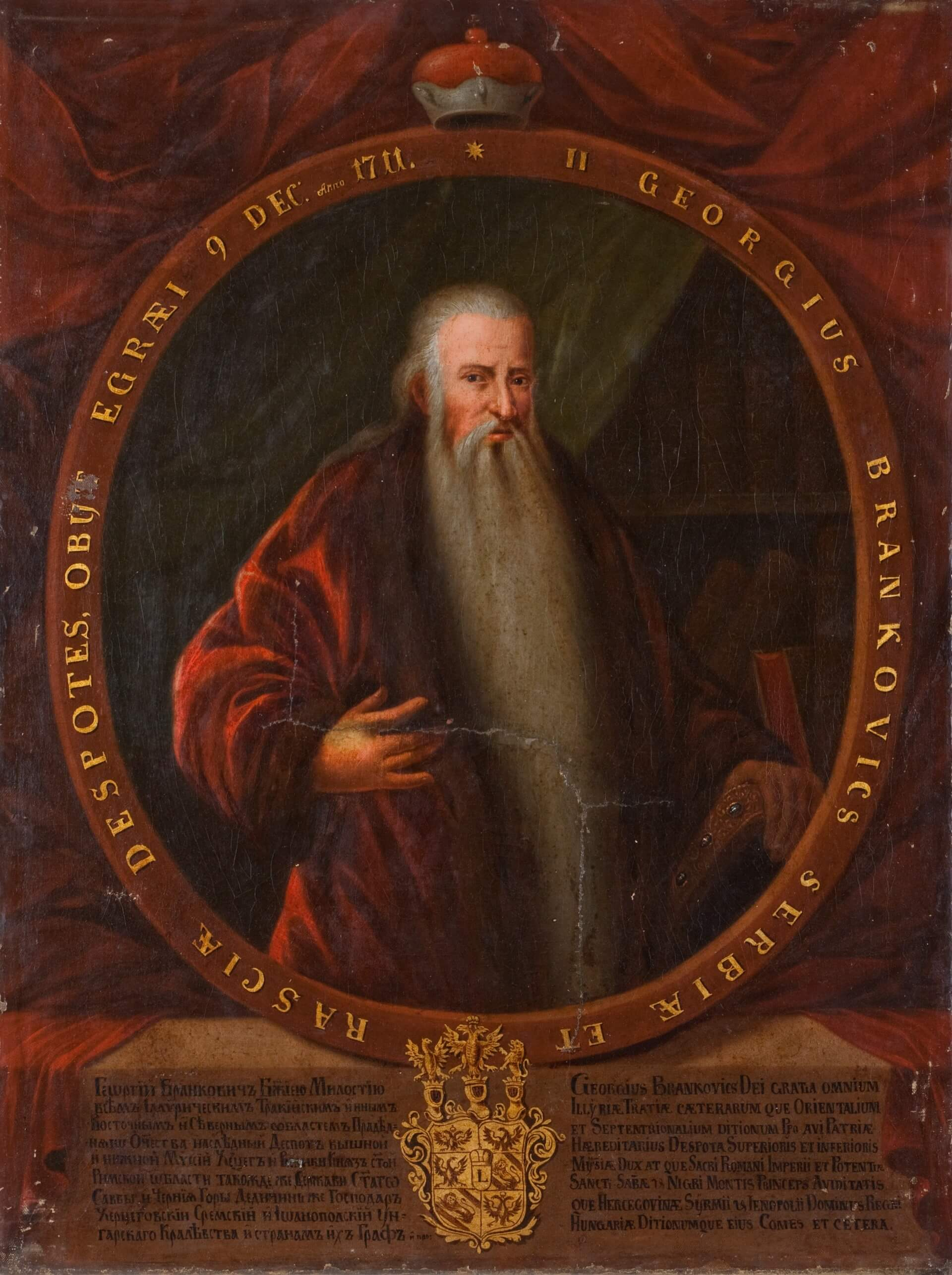
Count Đorđe Branković (d. 1711), writer of the Slavo-Serbian Chronicles

- Ottoman Serbia, designates periods of Ottoman rule in Serbia:
  - Sanjaks, which had parts of modern Serbia include: Bosnia, Smederevo, Kruševac, Niš, Novi Pazar, Syrmia, Prizren, Skopje, Vidin, Vučitrn.
- Habsburg-occupied Serbia, designates three periods of Habsburg rule in various parts of Serbia:
  - Habsburg-occupied Serbia (1686–1691)
  - Kingdom of Serbia (1718–1739)
  - Habsburg-occupied Serbia (1788–1791)
- Habsburg rule in northern parts of Serbia (present day Vojvodina) in 18th century:
  - Banat of Temeswar
  - Syrmia County
  - Bács-Bodrog County
- Habsburg–Ottoman wars fought on the territory of Serbia:
  - Habsburg–Ottoman War (1593–1606)
  - Habsburg–Ottoman War (1663–1664)
  - Habsburg–Ottoman War (1683–1699)
  - Habsburg–Ottoman War (1716–1718)
  - Habsburg–Ottoman War (1737–1739)
  - Habsburg–Ottoman War (1788–1791)
- Major Serbian uprisings during early modern period:
  - Uprising in Banat (1594)
  - Serb uprising of 1596–97 (in Herzegovina)
  - Serb uprising of 1737–39 (in Raška)
- Main Serbian ecclesiastical institutions during early modern period:
  - Serbian Patriarchate of Peć, renewed in 1557, abolished in 1766
  - Metropolitanate of Karlovci, created in 1708, for territories under Habsburg rule

The period is followed by the history of modern Serbia.

== See also ==
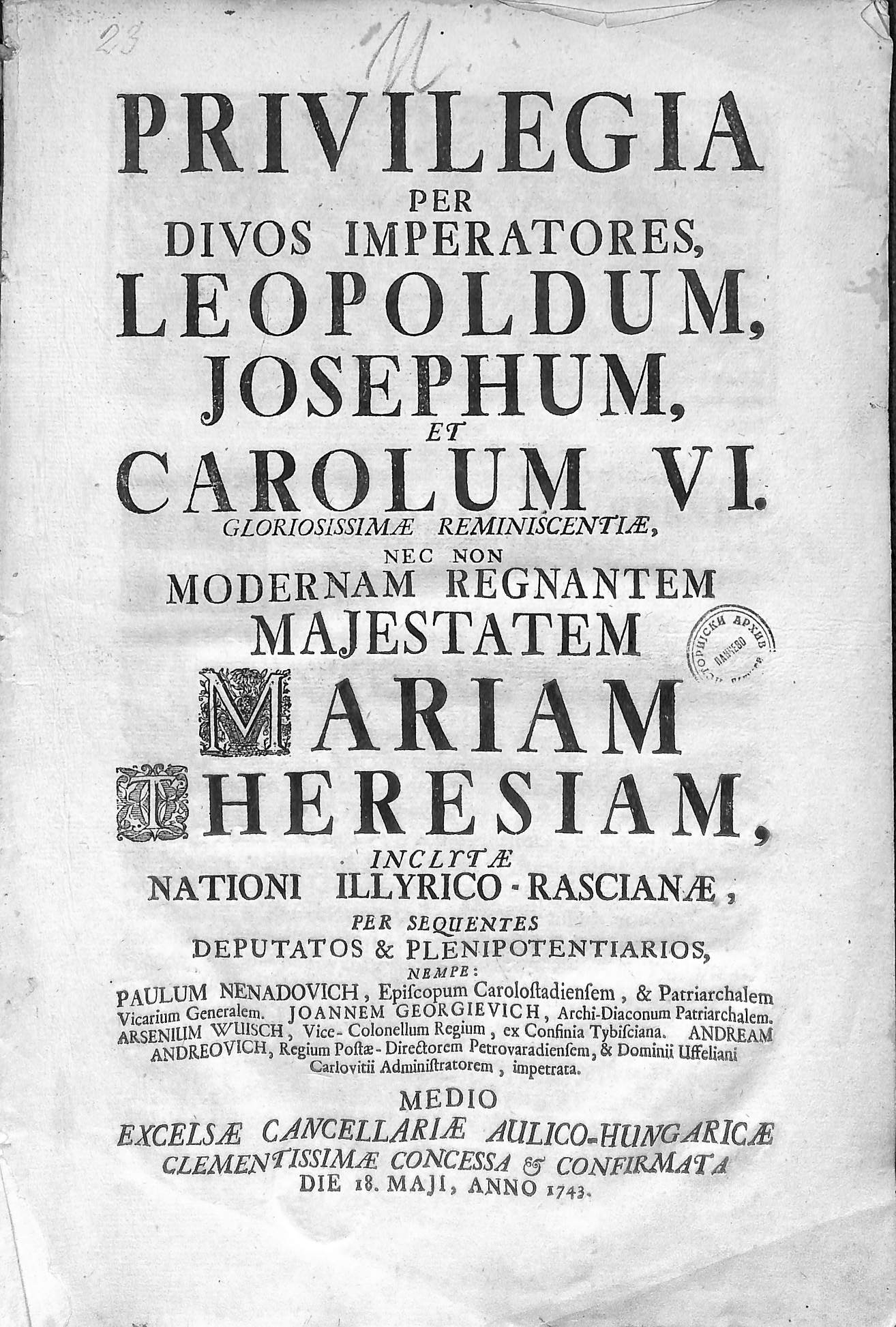
Confirmation of Serbian Privileges, issued by Maria Theresa in 1743

- History of Serbia
- History of the Serbs

== Sources ==
- Bataković, Dušan T., ed. (2005). Histoire du peuple serbe [History of the Serbian People] (in French). Lausanne: L’Age d’Homme. ISBN 9782825119587.
- Bronza, Boro (2010). "The Habsburg Monarchy and the Projects for Division of the Ottoman Balkans, 1771-1788". Empires and Peninsulas: Southeastern Europe between Karlowitz and the Peace of Adrianople, 1699–1829. Berlin: LIT Verlag. pp. 51–62. ISBN 9783643106117.
- Čanak-Medić, Milka; Todić, Branislav (2017). The Monastery of the Patriarchate of Peć. Novi Sad: Platoneum, Beseda. ISBN 9788685869839.
- Ćirković, Sima (2004). The Serbs. Malden: Blackwell Publishing. ISBN 9781405142915.
- Cox, John K. (2002). The History of Serbia. Westport, Connecticut: Greenwood Press. ISBN 9780313312908.
- Dávid, Géza; Fodor, Pál, eds. (1994). Hungarian-Ottoman Military and Diplomatic Relations in the Age of Süleyman the Magnificent. Budapest: Loránd Eötvös University, Hungarian Academy of Sciences, Institute of History. ISBN 9789638312310.
- Đorđević, Miloš Z. (2010). "A Background to Serbian Culture and Education in the First Half of the 18th Century according to Serbian Historiographical Sources". Empires and Peninsulas: Southeastern Europe between Karlowitz and the Peace of Adrianople, 1699–1829. Berlin: LIT Verlag. pp. 125–131. ISBN 9783643106117.
- Dragnich, Alex N., ed. (1994). Serbia's Historical Heritage. New York: Columbia University Press. ISBN 9780880332446.
- Dragnich, Alex N. (2004). Serbia Through the Ages. Boulder: East European Monographs. ISBN 9780880335416.
- Fodor, Pál; Dávid, Géza, eds. (2000). Ottomans, Hungarians, and Habsburgs in Central Europe: The Military Confines in the Era of Ottoman Conquest. Leiden: BRILL. ISBN 9004119078.
- Fotić, Aleksandar (2008). "Serbian Orthodox Church". Encyclopedia of the Ottoman Empire. New York: Infobase Publishing. pp. 519–520. ISBN 9781438110257.
- Gavrilović, Slavko (1993). "Serbs in Hungary, Slavonia and Croatia in struggles against the Turks (15th-18th centuries)". Serbs in European Civilization. Belgrade: Nova, Serbian Academy of Sciences and Arts, Institute for Balkan Studies. pp. 41–54. ISBN 9788675830153.
- Ingrao, Charles; Samardžić, Nikola; Pešalj, Jovan, eds. (2011). The Peace of Passarowitz, 1718. West Lafayette: Purdue University Press. ISBN 9781557535948.
- Ivić, Pavle, ed. (1995). The History of Serbian Culture. Edgware: Porthill Publishers. ISBN 9781870732314.
- Jelavich, Barbara (1983). History of the Balkans: Eighteenth and Nineteenth Centuries. Vol. 1. Cambridge University Press. ISBN 9780521252492.
- Kia, Mehrdad (2011). Daily Life in the Ottoman Empire. Santa Barbara, California: Greenwood Press. ISBN 9780313064029.
- Kursar, Vjeran (2013). "Non-Muslim Communal Divisions and Identities in the Early Modern Ottoman Balkans and the Millet System Theory". Power and Influence in South-Eastern Europe, 16th-19th century. Berlin: LIT Verlag. pp. 97–108. ISBN 9783643903310.
- Pavlovich, Paul (1989). The History of the Serbian Orthodox Church. Serbian Heritage Books. ISBN 9780969133124.
- Pavlowitch, Stevan K. (2002). Serbia: The History behind the Name. London: Hurst & Company. ISBN 9781850654773.
- Pešalj, Jovan (2010). "Early 18th-Century Peacekeeping: How Habsburgs and Ottomans Resolved Several Border Disputes after Karlowitz". Empires and Peninsulas: Southeastern Europe between Karlowitz and the Peace of Adrianople, 1699–1829. Berlin: LIT Verlag. pp. 29–42. ISBN 9783643106117.
- Runciman, Steven (1968). The Great Church in Captivity: A Study of the Patriarchate of Constantinople from the Eve of the Turkish Conquest to the Greek War of Independence (1. ed.). Cambridge: Cambridge University Press. ISBN 9780521071888.
- Samardžić, Radovan; Duškov, Milan, eds. (1993). Serbs in European Civilization. Belgrade: Nova, Serbian Academy of Sciences and Arts, Institute for Balkan Studies. ISBN 9788675830153.
- Sotirović, Vladislav B. (2011). "The Serbian Patriarchate of Peć in the Ottoman Empire: The First Phase (1557–94)". Serbian Studies. 25 (2). NASSS: 143–169. doi:10.1353/ser.2011.0038. S2CID 143629322.
- Stavrianos, Leften (2000) [1958]. The Balkans Since 1453. London: Hurst. ISBN 9781850655510.
