= List of birds of Serbia =

This is a list of the bird species recorded in Serbia. The avifauna of Serbia include a total of 376 species, of which 2 have been introduced by humans.

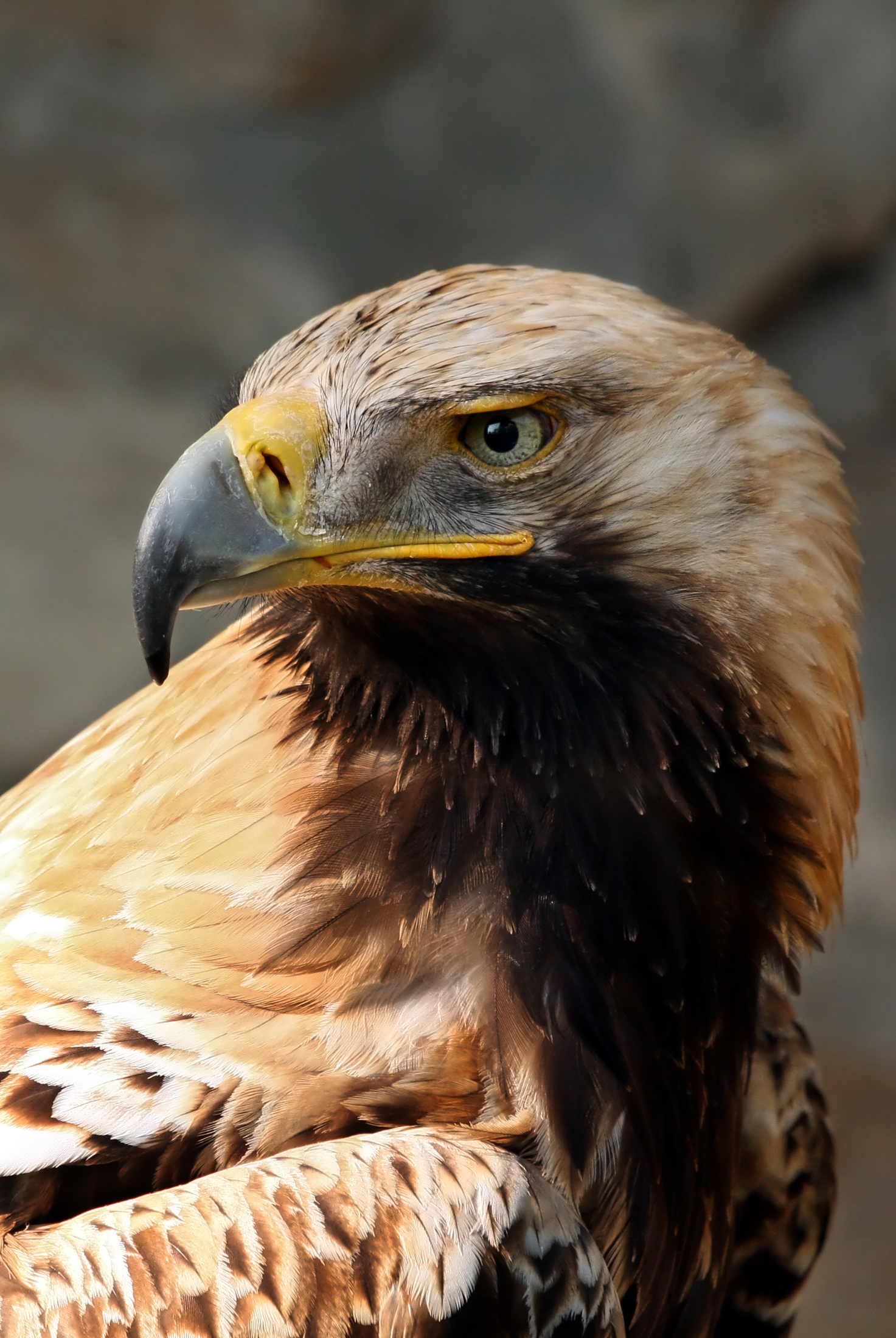
The eastern imperial eagle is the national bird of Serbia.

This list's taxonomic treatment (designation and sequence of orders, families and species) and nomenclature (common and scientific names) follow the conventions of The Clements Checklist of Birds of the World, 2022 edition. The family accounts at the beginning of each heading reflect this taxonomy, as do the species counts found in each family account. Introduced and accidental species are included in the total counts for Serbia.The following tags have been used to highlight several categories, but not all species fall into one of these categories. Those that do not are commonly occurring native species.The conservation status shown is local.

- (A) Accidental – a species that rarely or accidentally occurs in Serbia
- (I) Introduced – a species introduced to Serbia as a consequence, direct or indirect, of human actions
- (Ex) Extirpated – a species that no longer occurs in Serbia although populations exist elsewhere
- (EX) Globally extinct - a species that no longer exists anywhere in the world

== Pheasants, grouse, and allies ==
Order: Galliformes Family: Phasianidae

The Phasianidae are a family of terrestrial birds. In general, they are plump (although they vary in size), and have broad, relatively short wings.

Common and binomial names	Image	Status in Serbia	Conservation status
Common quail (Coturnix coturnix)		Breeding summer visitor	LC
Rock partridge (Alectoris graeca)		Rare localized breeding resident	NT
Common pheasant (Phasianus colchicus)		(I) Abundant introduced breeding resident	LC
Grey partridge (Perdix perdix)		Fairly common breeding resident	LC
Hazel grouse (Tetrastes bonasia)		Scarce localized breeding resident	LC
Western capercaillie (Tetrao urogallus)		Rare and highly localized breeding resident	LC
Black grouse (Lyrurus tetrix)		(Ex) Extirpated breeding resident; vanished mid-20th century	LC

== Ducks, geese, and waterfowl ==
Order: Anseriformes Family: Anatidae

Anatidae includes the ducks and most duck-like waterfowl, such as geese and swans. These birds are adapted to an aquatic existence with webbed feet, flattened bills, and feathers that are excellent at shedding water due to an oily coating.

Common and binomial names	Image	Status in Serbia	Conservation status
Snow goose (Anser caerulescens)		(A) Accidental winter vagrant	LC
Greylag goose (Anser anser)		Fairly common resident and winter visitor	LC
Greater white-fronted goose (Anser albifrons)		Common winter visitor	LC
Lesser white-fronted goose (Anser erythropus)		(A) Rare winter vagrant	EN
Taiga bean goose (Anser fabalis)		(A) Rare winter vagrant	LC
Tundra bean goose (Anser serrirostris)		(A) Scarce winter vagrant	LC
Pink-footed goose (Anser brachyrhynchus)		(A) Accidental winter vagrant	LC
Brant goose (Branta bernicla)		(A) Accidental winter vagrant	LC
Barnacle goose (Branta leucopsis)		(A) Accidental winter vagrant	LC
Canada goose (Branta canadensis)		(I) Rare introduced species	LC
Red-breasted goose (Branta ruficollis)		Rare winter visitor	VU
Mute swan (Cygnus olor)		Fairly common resident breeder	LC
Tundra swan (Cygnus columbianus)		Scarce winter visitor	LC
Whooper swan (Cygnus cygnus)		Regular winter visitor	LC
Egyptian goose (Alopochen aegyptiacus)		(A) Accidental vagrant	LC
Ruddy shelduck (Tadorna ferruginea)		(A) Rare vagrant	LC
Common shelduck (Tadorna tadorna)		Fairly common migrant and winter visitor	LC
Wood duck (Aix sponsa)		(I) Rare introduced species	LC
Mandarin duck (Aix galericulata)		(A) Accidental vagrant	LC
Garganey (Spatula querquedula)		Common summer visitor and breeding resident	LC
Northern shoveler (Spatula clypeata)		Scarce resident breeder; common winter visitor	LC
Gadwall (Mareca strepera)		Scarce resident breeder; common winter visitor	LC
Eurasian wigeon (Mareca penelope)		Common winter visitor	LC
Mallard (Anas platyrhynchos)		Abundant resident breeder and winter visitor	LC
Northern pintail (Anas acuta)		Scarce resident breeder; common winter visitor	LC
Common teal (Anas crecca)		Rare resident breeder; abundant winter visitor	LC
Red-crested pochard (Netta rufina)		Scarce breeder and migrant	LC
Common pochard (Aythya ferina)		Common resident breeder and winter visitor	VU
Ring-necked duck (Aythya collaris)		(A) Accidental winter vagrant	LC
Ferruginous duck (Aythya nyroca)		Fairly common resident breeder	VU
Tufted duck (Aythya fuligula)		Scarce resident breeder; common winter visitor	LC
Greater scaup (Aythya marila)		Scarce winter visitor	LC
Common eider (Somateria mollissima)		(A) Accidental winter vagrant	NT
Velvet scoter (Melanitta fusca)		Rare winter visitor	VU
Common scoter (Melanitta nigra)		(A) Rare winter vagrant	LC
Long-tailed duck (Clangula hyemalis)		Rare winter visitor	VU
Common goldeneye (Bucephala clangula)		Common winter visitor	LC
Smew (Mergellus albellus)		Fairly common winter visitor	LC
Goosander (Mergus merganser)		Rare resident breeder; common winter visitor	LC
Red-breasted merganser (Mergus serrator)		Regular winter visitor	LC
White-headed duck (Oxyura leucocephala)		(Ex) Extirpated breeding resident; vanished mid-20th century	EN

== Grebes ==
Order: Podicipediformes Family: Podicipedidae

Grebes are small to medium-large freshwater diving birds. They have lobed toes and are excellent swimmers and divers. However, they have their feet placed far back on the body, making them quite ungainly on land.

Common and binomial names	Image	Status in Serbia	Conservation status
Little grebe (Tachybaptus ruficollis)		Common resident breeder and winter visitor	LC
Horned grebe (Podiceps auritus)		Rare winter visitor	VU
Red-necked grebe (Podiceps grisegena)		Scarce resident breeder; fairly common migrant	LC
Great crested grebe (Podiceps cristatus)		Common resident breeder and winter visitor	LC
Black-necked grebe (Podiceps nigricollis)		Fairly common resident breeder and migrant	LC

== Flamingos ==
Order: Phoenicopteriformes Family: Phoenicopteridae

Flamingos are gregarious wading birds, usually 1 to 1.5 metres (3 to 5 ft) tall, found in both the Western and Eastern Hemispheres. Flamingos filter-feed on shellfish and algae. Their oddly shaped beaks are specially adapted to separate mud and silt from the food they consume and, uniquely, are used upside-down.

Common and binomial names	Image	Status in Serbia	Conservation status
Greater flamingo (Phoenicopterus roseus)		(A) Accidental vagrant	LC

== Pigeons and doves ==
Order: Columbiformes Family: Columbidae

Pigeons and doves are stout-bodied birds with short necks and short slender bills with a fleshy cere.

Common and binomial names	Image	Status in Serbia	Conservation status
Rock dove (Columba livia)		Abundant feral resident; native wild populations are exceptionally rare or functionally extinct.	LC
Stock dove (Columba oenas)		Fairly common resident breeder and migrant	LC
Common wood pigeon (Columba palumbus)		Common resident breeder and migrant	LC
European turtle dove (Streptopelia turtur)		Common summer visitor and breeding resident	VU
Oriental turtle dove (Streptopelia orientalis)		(A) Accidental vagrant	LC
Eurasian collared dove (Streptopelia decaocto)		Abundant resident breeder	LC

== Sandgrouse ==
Order: Pterocliformes Family: Pteroclidae

Sandgrouse have small, pigeon like heads and necks, but sturdy compact bodies. They have long pointed wings and sometimes tails and a fast direct flight. Flocks fly to watering holes at dawn and dusk. Their legs are feathered down to the toes.

Common and binomial names	Image	Status in Serbia	Conservation status
Pallas's sandgrouse (Syrrhaptes paradoxus)		(A) Accidental vagrant; historically irruptive visitor	LC

== Nightjars and allies ==
Order: Caprimulgiformes Family: Caprimulgidae

Nightjars are medium-sized nocturnal birds that usually nest on the ground. They have long wings, short legs and very short bills. Most have small feet, of little use for walking, and long pointed wings. Their soft plumage is camouflaged to resemble bark or leaves.

Common and binomial names	Image	Status in Serbia	Conservation status
European nightjar (Caprimulgus europaeus)		Fairly common summer visitor and breeding resident	LC

== Swifts ==
Order: Caprimulgiformes Family: Apodidae

Swifts are small birds which spend the majority of their lives flying. These birds have very short legs and never settle voluntarily on the ground, perching instead only on vertical surfaces. Many swifts have long swept-back wings which resemble a crescent.

Common and binomial names	Image	Status in Serbia	Conservation status
Alpine swift (Apus melba)		Fairly common summer visitor and breeding resident	LC
Common swift (Apus apus)		Common summer visitor and breeding resident	LC
Pallid swift (Apus pallidus)		Rare summer visitor and breeding resident	LC

== Cuckoos ==
Order: Cuculiformes Family: Cuculidae

The family Cuculidae includes cuckoos, roadrunners and anis. These birds are of variable size with slender bodies, long tails and strong legs. The Old World cuckoos are brood parasites.

Common and binomial names	Image	Status in Serbia	Conservation status
Great spotted cuckoo (Clamator glandarius)		(A) Accidental vagrant	LC
Common cuckoo (Cuculus canorus)		Common summer visitor and breeding resident	LC

== Rails, gallinules, and coots ==
Order: Gruiformes Family: Rallidae

Rallidae is a large family of small to medium-sized birds which includes the rails, crakes, coots and gallinules. Typically they inhabit dense vegetation in damp environments near lakes, swamps or rivers. In general they are shy and secretive birds, making them difficult to observe. Most species have strong legs and long toes which are well adapted to soft uneven surfaces. They tend to have short, rounded wings and to be weak fliers.

Common and binomial names	Image	Status in Serbia	Conservation status
Water rail (Rallus aquaticus)		Fairly common resident breeder and migrant	LC
Corn crake (Crex crex)		Fairly common summer visitor and breeding resident	LC
Spotted crake (Porzana porzana)		Scarce summer visitor and breeding resident	LC
Common moorhen (Gallinula chloropus)		Common resident breeder and migrant	LC
Eurasian coot (Fulica atra)		Abundant resident breeder and winter visitor	LC
Little crake (Zapornia parva)		Fairly common summer visitor and breeding resident	LC
Baillon's crake (Zapornia pusilla)		(A) Accidental migrant and vagrant	LC

== Cranes ==
Order: Gruiformes Family: Gruidae

Cranes are large, long-legged and long-necked birds. Unlike the similar-looking but unrelated herons, cranes fly with necks outstretched, not pulled back. Most have elaborate and noisy courting displays or "dances".

Common and binomial names	Image	Status in Serbia	Conservation status
Common crane (Grus grus)		Abundant localized autumn migrant; historically an extirpated breeder	LC

== Bustards ==
Order: Otidiformes Family: Otididae

Bustards are large terrestrial birds mainly associated with dry open country and steppes in the Old World. They are omnivorous and nest on the ground. They walk steadily on strong legs and big toes, pecking for food as they go. They have long broad wings with "fingered" wingtips and striking patterns in flight. Many have interesting mating displays.

Common and binomial names	Image	Status in Serbia	Conservation status
Great bustard (Otis tarda)		Rare and critically threatened resident breeder; localized strictly to northern plains.	CR
Little bustard (Tetrax tetrax)		(Ex) Extirpated breeder; completely vanished as a nesting species during the 20th century.	NT

== Divers ==
Order: Gaviiformes Family: Gaviidae

Divers, known as loons in North America, are a group of aquatic birds found in many parts of the arctic and cool temperate regions of the Northern Hemisphere. They are the size of a large duck or small goose, which they somewhat resemble when swimming, but to which they are completely unrelated.

Common and binomial names	Image	Status in Serbia	Conservation status
Red-throated diver (Gavia stellata)		Rare winter visitor	LC
Black-throated diver (Gavia arctica)		Regular winter visitor and migrant	LC
Great northern diver (Gavia immer)		(A) Accidental winter vagrant	LC
White-billed diver (Gavia adamsii)		(A) Accidental winter vagrant	NT

== Storks ==
Order: Ciconiiformes Family: Ciconiidae

Storks are large, long-legged, long-necked, wading birds with long, stout bills. Storks are mute, but bill-clattering is an important mode of communication at the nest. Their nests can be large and may be reused for many years. Many species are migratory.

Common and binomial names	Image	Status in Serbia	Conservation status
Black stork (Ciconia nigra)		Fairly common summer visitor and breeding resident	LC
White stork (Ciconia ciconia)		Common summer visitor and breeding resident	LC

== Ibises and spoonbills ==
Order: Pelecaniformes Family: Threskiornithidae

Threskiornithidae is a family of large terrestrial and wading birds which includes the ibises and spoonbills. They have long, broad wings with 11 primary and about 20 secondary feathers. They are strong fliers and despite their size and weight, very capable soarers.

Common and binomial names	Image	Status in Serbia	Conservation status
Glossy ibis (Plegadis falcinellus)		Scarce summer visitor and breeding resident; regular migrant	LC
Eurasian spoonbill (Platalea leucorodia)		Fairly common summer visitor and breeding resident	LC

== Herons, egrets, and bitterns ==
Order: Pelecaniformes Family: Ardeidae

The family Ardeidae contains the bitterns, herons, and egrets. Herons and egrets are medium to large wading birds with long necks and legs. Bitterns tend to be shorter necked and more wary. Members of Ardeidae fly with their necks retracted, unlike other long-necked birds such as storks, ibises and spoonbills.

Common and binomial names	Image	Status in Serbia	Conservation status
Eurasian bittern (Botaurus stellaris)		Fairly common resident breeder and migrant	LC
Little bittern (Botaurus minutus)		Common summer visitor and breeding resident	LC
Black-crowned night heron (Nycticorax nycticorax)		Common summer visitor and breeding resident	LC
Little egret (Egretta garzetta)		Common summer visitor and breeding resident	LC
Squacco heron (Ardeola ralloides)		Fairly common summer visitor and breeding resident	LC
Western cattle egret (Ardea ibis)		Regular post-breeding visitor and scarce breeder	LC
Great egret (Ardea alba)		Fairly common resident breeder and winter visitor	LC
Grey heron (Ardea cinerea)		Common resident breeder and winter visitor	LC
Purple heron (Ardea purpurea)		Common summer visitor and breeding resident	LC

== Pelicans ==
Order: Pelecaniformes Family: Pelecanidae

Pelicans are large water birds with a distinctive pouch under their beak. As with other members of the order Pelecaniformes, they have webbed feet with four toes.

Common and binomial names	Image	Status in Serbia	Conservation status
Great white pelican (Pelecanus onocrotalus)		(A) Accidental vagrant	LC
Dalmatian pelican (Pelecanus crispus)		(A) Accidental vagrant; historically extirpated breeder	VU

== Cormorants and shags ==
Order: Suliformes Family: Phalacrocoracidae

Phalacrocoracidae is a family of medium to large coastal, fish-eating seabirds that includes cormorants and shags. Plumage patterning varies, with the majority having mainly dark plumage, some species being black-and-white, and many have brightly coloured eyes and skin at the base of the bill.

Common and binomial names	Image	Status in Serbia	Conservation status
Pygmy cormorant (Microcarbo pygmaeus)		Common resident breeder and winter visitor	LC
Great cormorant (Phalacrocorax carbo)		Abundant resident breeder and winter visitor	LC

== Thick-knees ==
Order: Charadriiformes Family: Burhinidae

The thick-knees are a group of largely tropical waders in the family Burhinidae. They are found worldwide within the tropical zone, with some species also breeding in temperate Europe and Australia. They are medium to large waders with strong black or yellow-black bills, large yellow eyes and cryptic plumage. Despite being classed as waders, most species have a preference for arid or semi-arid habitats.

Common and binomial names	Image	Status in Serbia	Conservation status
Eurasian stone-curlew (Burhinus oedicnemus)		Rare summer visitor and breeding resident	LC

== Oystercatchers ==
Order: Charadriiformes Family: Haematopodidae

The oystercatchers are large and noisy plover-like birds, with strong bills used for smashing or prising open molluscs.

Common and binomial names	Image	Status in Serbia	Conservation status
Eurasian oystercatcher (Haematopus ostralegus)		Rare migrant and scarce winter visitor	NT

== Avocets and stilts ==
Order: Charadriiformes Family: Recurvirostridae

Recurvirostridae is a family of large wading birds, which includes the avocets and stilts. The avocets have long legs and long up-curved bills. The stilts have extremely long legs and long, thin, straight bills.

Common and binomial names	Image	Status in Serbia	Conservation status
Black-winged stilt (Himantopus himantopus)		Fairly common summer visitor and breeding resident	LC
Pied avocet (Recurvirostra avosetta)		Scarce summer visitor and breeding resident; regular migrant	LC

== Plovers and lapwings ==
Order: Charadriiformes Family: Charadriidae

The family Charadriidae includes the plovers, dotterels and lapwings. They are small to medium-sized birds with compact bodies, short, thick necks and long, usually pointed, wings. They are found in open country worldwide, mostly in habitats near water.

Common and binomial names	Image	Status in Serbia	Conservation status
Grey plover (Pluvialis squatarola)		Regular migrant	LC
European golden plover (Pluvialis apricaria)		Common migrant and winter visitor	LC
American golden plover (Pluvialis dominica)		(A) Accidental vagrant	LC
Pacific golden plover (Pluvialis fulva)		(A) Accidental vagrant	LC
Eurasian dotterel (Charadrius morinellus)		(A) Rare migrant	LC
Common ringed plover (Charadrius hiaticula)		Regular migrant	LC
Little ringed plover (Charadrius dubius)		Common summer visitor and breeding resident	LC
Northern lapwing (Vanellus vanellus)		Common resident breeder and winter visitor	NT
Sociable lapwing (Vanellus gregarius)		(A) Accidental vagrant	CR
White-tailed lapwing (Vanellus leucurus)		(A) Accidental vagrant	LC
Kentish plover (Charadrius alexandrinus)		(A) Rare migrant; historically casual breeder	LC

== Sandpipers and allies ==
Order: Charadriiformes Family: Scolopacidae

Scolopacidae is a large diverse family of small to medium-sized shorebirds including the sandpipers, curlews, godwits, shanks, tattlers, woodcocks, snipes, dowitchers and phalaropes. The majority of these species eat small invertebrates picked out of the mud or soil. Variation in length of legs and bills enables multiple species to feed in the same habitat, particularly on the coast, without direct competition for food.

Common and binomial names	Image	Status in Serbia	Conservation status
Eurasian Whimbrel (Numenius phaeopus)		Regular migrant	LC
Slender-billed curlew (Numenius tenuirostris)		(A) (EX) Historically an regular passage migrant; now globally extinct	EX
Eurasian curlew (Numenius arquata)		Rare resident breeder; common migrant and winter visitor	NT
Bar-tailed godwit (Limosa lapponica)		(A) Rare migrant	NT
Black-tailed godwit (Limosa limosa)		Rare resident breeder; common migrant	NT
Jack snipe (Lymnocryptes minimus)		Regular migrant and winter visitor	LC
Eurasian woodcock (Scolopax rusticola)		Fairly common resident breeder and migrant	LC
Great snipe (Gallinago media)		Rare migrant	NT
Common snipe (Gallinago gallinago)		Rare resident breeder; common migrant and winter visitor	LC
Red phalarope (Phalaropus fulicarius)		(A) Accidental autumn/winter vagrant	LC
Red-necked phalarope (Phalaropus lobatus)		Rare migrant	LC
Terek sandpiper (Xenus cinereus)		(A) Accidental migrant	LC
Common sandpiper (Actitis hypoleucos)		Fairly common resident breeder and migrant	LC
Green sandpiper (Tringa ochropus)		Common migrant and regular winter visitor	LC
Marsh sandpiper (Tringa stagnatilis)		Regular migrant	LC
Wood sandpiper (Tringa glareola)		Common migrant	LC
Common redshank (Tringa totanus)		Scarce resident breeder; common migrant	LC
Spotted redshank (Tringa erythropus)		Common migrant	LC
Common greenshank (Tringa nebularia)		Common migrant	LC
Ruddy turnstone (Arenaria interpres)		Scarce migrant	LC
Red knot (Calidris canutus)		(A) Rare migrant	NT
Ruff (Calidris pugnax)		Common migrant	LC
Broad-billed sandpiper (Calidris falcinellus)		Regular migrant	LC
Curlew sandpiper (Calidris ferruginea)		Regular migrant	NT
Temminck's stint (Calidris temminckii)		Regular migrant	LC
Sanderling (Calidris alba)		Regular migrant	LC
Dunlin (Calidris alpina)		Common migrant and winter visitor	LC
Little stint (Calidris minuta)		Common migrant	LC
Pectoral sandpiper (Calidris melanotos)		(A) Accidental migrant	LC

== Pratincoles and coursers ==
Order: Charadriiformes Family: Glareolidae

Glareolidae is a family of wading birds comprising the pratincoles, which have short legs, long pointed wings and long forked tails, and the coursers, which have long legs, short wings and long, pointed bills which curve downwards.

Common and binomial names	Image	Status in Serbia	Conservation status
Cream-colored courser (Cursorius cursor)		(A) Accidental vagrant	LC
Collared pratincole (Glareola pratincola)		(A) Rare migrant; historically a localized, sporadic breeder	LC
Black-winged pratincole (Glareola nordmanni)		(A) Accidental vagrant	NT

== Gulls and terns ==
Order: Charadriiformes Family: Laridae

Laridae is a family of medium to large seabirds, the gulls and terns. Gulls are typically grey or white, often with black markings on the head or wings. They have stout, longish bills and webbed feet. Terns are a group of generally medium to large seabirds typically with grey or white plumage, often with black markings on the head. Most terns hunt fish by diving but some pick insects off the surface of fresh water. Gulls and terns are generally long-lived birds, with several species known to live in excess of 30 years. The Serbian list still maintains the terns as a separate family Sternidae

Common and binomial names	Image	Status in Serbia	Conservation status
Little gull (Hydrocoloeus minutus)		Common migrant and regular winter visitor	LC
Black-legged kittiwake (Rissa tridactyla)		(A) Accidental winter vagrant	VU
Black-headed gull (Chroicocephalus ridibundus)		Common resident breeder and abundant winter visitor	LC
Pallas's gull (Ichthyaetus ichthyaetus)		(A) Accidental vagrant	LC
Mediterranean gull (Ichthyaetus melanocephalus)		Scarce resident breeder and regular migrant	LC
Common gull (Larus canus)		Common winter visitor and migrant	LC
Caspian gull (Larus cachinnans)		Fairly common resident breeder and winter visitor	LC
European herring gull (Larus argentatus)		Rare winter visitor	LC
Yellow-legged gull (Larus michahellis)		Common resident breeder and winter visitor	LC
Great black-backed gull (Larus marinus)		Rare winter visitor	LC
Lesser black-backed gull (Larus fuscus)		Regular migrant and winter visitor	LC
Little tern (Sternula albifrons)		Rare summer visitor and breeding resident	LC
Gull-billed tern (Gelochelidon nilotica)		Scarce migrant	LC
Caspian tern (Hydroprogne caspia)		Regular migrant	LC
Whiskered tern (Chlidonias hybrida)		Fairly common summer visitor and breeding resident	LC
Black tern (Chlidonias niger)		Scarce summer visitor and breeding resident; common migrant	LC
White-winged tern (Chlidonias leucopterus)		Common migrant	LC
Common tern (Sterna hirundo)		Fairly common summer visitor and breeding resident	LC
Sandwich tern (Thalasseus sandvicensis)		(A) Accidental migrant	LC

== Skuas ==
Order: Charadriiformes Family: Stercorariidae

The family Stercorariidae are, in general, medium to large birds, typically with grey or brown plumage, often with white markings on the wings. They nest on the ground in temperate and arctic regions and are long-distance migrants. Some are also known as jaegers, particularly in North America.

Common and binomial names	Image	Status in Serbia	Conservation status
Long-tailed jaeger (Stercorarius longicaudus)		(A) Accidental autumn vagrant	LC
Parasitic jaeger (Stercorarius parasiticus)		(A) Accidental autumn/winter vagrant	LC
Pomarine jaeger (Stercorarius pomarinus)		(A) Accidental autumn/winter vagrant	LC

== Barn owls ==
Order: Strigiformes Family: Tytonidae

Barn owls are medium to large owls with large heads and characteristic heart-shaped faces. They have long strong legs with powerful talons.

Common and binomial names	Image	Status in Serbia	Conservation status
Western barn owl (Tyto alba)		Common resident breeder	LC

== Owls ==
Order: Strigiformes Family: Strigidae

The typical owls are small to large solitary nocturnal birds of prey. They have large forward-facing eyes and ears, a hawk-like beak and a conspicuous circle of feathers around each eye called a facial disk.

Common and binomial names	Image	Status in Serbia	Conservation status
Eurasian scops owl (Otus scops)		Common summer visitor and breeding resident	LC
Eurasian eagle-owl (Bubo bubo)		Fairly common resident breeder	LC
Eurasian pygmy owl (Glaucidium passerinum)		Scarce and localized resident breeder in high mountains	LC
Little owl (Athene noctua)		Common resident breeder	LC
Tawny owl (Strix aluco)		Common resident breeder	LC
Ural owl (Strix uralensis)		Fairly common resident breeder in mountain forests	LC
Long-eared owl (Asio otus)		Common resident breeder and abundant winter visitor	LC
Short-eared owl (Asio flammeus)		Rare resident breeder and scarce winter visitor	LC
Boreal owl (Aegolius funereus)		Scarce resident breeder; restricted to high-mountain conifer forests	LC

== Osprey ==
Order: Accipitriformes Family: Pandionidae

The family Pandionidae contains only one species, the osprey. The osprey is a medium-large raptor which is a specialist fish-eater with a worldwide distribution.

Common and binomial names	Image	Status in Serbia	Conservation status
Osprey (Pandion haliaetus)		Regular migrant; historically extirpated breeder	LC

== Hawks, eagles, and kites ==
Order: Accipitriformes Family: Accipitridae

Accipitridae is a family of birds of prey, which includes hawks, eagles, kites, harriers and Old World vultures. These birds have powerful hooked beaks for tearing flesh from their prey, strong legs, powerful talons and keen eyesight.

Common and binomial names	Image	Status in Serbia	Conservation status
Bearded vulture (Gypaetus barbatus)		(Ex) Extirpated breeder; currently a rare accidental vagrant	NT
Egyptian vulture (Neophron percnopterus)		(A) Accidental vagrant; historically an extirpated breeder	EN
European honey buzzard (Pernis apivorus)		Fairly common summer visitor and breeding resident	LC
Cinereous vulture (Aegypius monachus)		(A) Accidental vagrant; historically an extirpated breeder	NT
Griffon vulture (Gyps fulvus)		Localized resident breeder; recovering conservation success story	VU
Short-toed snake eagle (Circaetus gallicus)		Scarce summer visitor and breeding resident	LC
Lesser spotted eagle (Clanga pomarina)		Rare summer visitor and breeding resident	LC
Greater spotted eagle (Clanga clanga)		Scarce migrant and rare winter visitor	VU
Booted eagle (Hieraaetus pennatus)		Rare summer visitor and breeding resident	
Eastern imperial eagle (Aquila heliaca)		Endangered breeding resident; small localized population	EN
Golden eagle (Aquila chrysaetos)		Scarce resident breeder; restricted to high mountain regions	LC
Bonelli's eagle (Aquila fasciata)		(A) Accidental vagrant	LC
Levant sparrowhawk (Accipiter brevipes)		Scarce summer visitor and breeding resident	LC
Eurasian sparrowhawk (Accipiter nisus)		Common resident breeder and winter visitor	LC
Eurasian goshawk (Accipiter gentilis)		Fairly common resident breeder	LC
Western marsh harrier (Circus aeruginosus)		Fairly common resident breeder and migrant	LC
Hen harrier (Circus cyaneus)		Common winter visitor and migrant	LC
Pallid harrier (Circus macrourus)		Regular but scarce migrant	NT
Montagu's harrier (Circus pygargus)		Scarce summer visitor and breeding resident	LC
Red kite (Milvus milvus)		Rare resident breeder and migrant	LC
Black kite (Milvus migrans)		Fairly common summer visitor and breeding resident	LC
White-tailed eagle (Haliaeetus albicilla)		Fairly common resident breeder; stronghold in lowland wetlands and rivers	LC
Rough-legged buzzard (Buteo lagopus)		Fairly common winter visitor	LC
Common buzzard (Buteo buteo)		Abundant resident breeder and winter visitor	LC
Long-legged buzzard (Buteo rufinus)		Fairly common resident breeder	LC

== Hoopoes ==
Order: Bucerotiformes Family: Upupidae

Hoopoes have black, white and orangey-pink colouring with a large erectile crest on their head.

Common and binomial names	Image	Status in Serbia	Conservation status
Eurasian hoopoe (Upupa epops)		Common summer visitor and breeding resident	LC

== Bee-eaters ==
Order: Coraciiformes Family: Meropidae

The bee-eaters are a group of coraciiform birds in the family Meropidae. Most species are found in Africa but others occur in southern Europe, Madagascar, Australia and New Guinea. They are characterised by richly coloured plumage, slender bodies and usually elongated central tail feathers. All are colourful and have long downturned bills and pointed wings, which give them a swallow-like appearance when seen from afar.

Common and binomial names	Image	Status in Serbia	Conservation status
European bee-eater (Merops apiaster)		Common summer visitor and breeding resident	LC

== Rollers ==
Order: Coraciiformes Family: Coraciidae

Rollers resemble crows in size and build, but are more closely related to the kingfishers and bee-eaters. They share the colourful appearance of those groups with blues and browns predominating. The two inner front toes are connected, but the outer toe is not.

Common and binomial names	Image	Status in Serbia	Conservation status
European roller (Coracias garrulus)		Fairly common summer visitor and breeding resident	LC

== Kingfishers ==
Order: Coraciiformes Family: Alcedinidae

Kingfishers are medium-sized birds with large heads, long, pointed bills, short legs and stubby tails.

Common and binomial names	Image	Status in Serbia	Conservation status
Common kingfisher (Alcedo atthis)		Common resident breeder and winter visitor	LC

== Woodpeckers ==
Order: Piciformes Family: Picidae

Woodpeckers are small to medium-sized birds with chisel-like beaks, short legs, stiff tails and long tongues used for capturing insects. Some species have feet with two toes pointing forward and two backward, while several species have only three toes. Many woodpeckers have the habit of tapping noisily on tree trunks with their beaks.

Common and binomial names	Image	Status in Serbia	Conservation status
Eurasian wryneck (Jynx torquilla)		Common summer visitor and breeding resident	LC
Eurasian three-toed woodpecker (Picoides tridactylus)		Scarce and localized resident breeder; restricted to montane conifer forests	LC
Middle spotted woodpecker (Dendrocoptes medius)		Fairly common resident breeder in deciduous woodlands	LC
White-backed woodpecker (Dendrocopos leucotos)		Scarce resident breeder; localized in mature mountain forests	LC
Great spotted woodpecker (Dendrocopos major)		Abundant resident breeder across all forest types	LC
Syrian woodpecker (Dendrocopos syriacus)		Common resident breeder; widely distributed in agricultural and urban habitats	LC
Lesser spotted woodpecker (Dryobates minor)		Fairly common resident breeder	LC
Grey-headed woodpecker (Picus canus)		Fairly common resident breeder	LC
European green woodpecker (Picus viridis)		Common resident breeder	LC
Black woodpecker (Dryocopus martius)		Fairly common resident breeder in large, mature woodland tracts	LC

== Falcons and caracaras ==
Order: Falconiformes Family: Falconidae

Falconidae is a family of diurnal birds of prey. They differ from hawks, eagles and kites in that they kill with their beaks instead of their talons.

Common and binomial names	Image	Status in Serbia	Conservation status
Lesser kestrel (Falco naumanni)		Rare summer visitor and highly localized breeding resident	LC
Common kestrel (Falco tinnunculus)		Abundant resident breeder and winter visitor	LC
Red-footed falcon (Falco vespertinus)		Scarce summer visitor and highly localized breeding resident; common migrant	VU
Eleonora's falcon (Falco eleonorae)		(A) Accidental summer vagrant	LC
Merlin (bird) (Falco columbarius)		Fairly common winter visitor and migrant	LC
Eurasian hobby (Falco subbuteo)		Fairly common summer visitor and breeding resident	LC
Lanner falcon (Falco biarmicus)		(A) Rare vagrant; historically a casual breeder	LC
Saker falcon (Falco cherrug)		Rare and critically threatened breeding resident; confined mostly to northern plains	CR
Peregrine falcon (Falco peregrinus)		Rare breeding resident and regular winter visitor	LC

== Shrikes ==
Order: Passeriformes Family: Laniidae

Shrikes are passerine birds known for their habit of catching large insects, and small birds and mammals, and impaling the uneaten portions of their bodies on thorns. A typical shrike's beak is hooked, like a bird of prey.

Common and binomial names	Image	Status in Serbia	Conservation status
Red-backed shrike (Lanius collurio)		Common summer visitor and breeding resident	LC
Great grey shrike (Lanius excubitor)		Regular winter visitor and migrant	LC
Lesser grey shrike (Lanius minor)		Fairly common summer visitor and breeding resident	LC
Masked shrike (Lanius nubicus)		(A) Accidental vagrant	LC
Woodchat shrike (Lanius senator)		Rare summer visitor and breeding resident	NT

== Old World orioles ==
Order: Passeriformes Family: Oriolidae

The Old World orioles are colourful passerine birds. They are not related to the New World orioles.

Common and binomial names	Image	Status in Serbia	Conservation status
Eurasian golden oriole (Oriolus oriolus)		Common summer visitor and breeding resident	LC

== Crows, jays, and magpies ==
Order: Passeriformes Family: Corvidae

The family Corvidae includes crows, ravens, jays, choughs, magpies, treepies, nutcrackers and ground jays. Corvids are above average in size among the Passeriformes, and some of the larger species show high levels of intelligence.

Common and binomial names	Image	Status in Serbia	Conservation status
Eurasian jay (Garrulus glandarius)		Abundant resident breeder	LC
Eurasian magpie (Pica pica)		Abundant resident breeder	LC
Spotted nutcracker (Nucifraga caryocatactes)		Fairly common resident breeder in mountain conifer forests	LC
Red-billed chough (Pyrrhocorax pyrrhocorax)		(A) Accidental vagrant; historically an extirpated breeder	LC
Alpine chough (Pyrrhocorax graculus)		Rare and highly localized resident breeder on high alpine peaks	LC
Western jackdaw (Coloeus monedula)		Abundant resident breeder and winter visitor	LC
Rook (bird) (Corvus frugilegus)		Abundant resident breeder and winter visitor	LC
Hooded crow (Corvus cornix)		Abundant resident breeder	LC
Northern raven (Corvus corax)		Common resident breeder	LC

== Waxwings ==
Order: Passeriformes Family: Bombycillidae

The waxwings are a group of birds with soft silky plumage and unique red tips to some of the wing feathers. In the Bohemian and cedar waxwings, these tips look like sealing wax and give the group its English name. These are arboreal birds of northern forests. They live on insects in summer and berries in winter.

Common and binomial names	Image	Status in Serbia	Conservation status
Bohemian waxwing (Bombycilla garrulus)		Irruptive winter visitor; numbers vary significantly from year to year	LC

== Tits, chickadees, and titmice ==
Order: Passeriformes Family: Paridae

The Paridae are mainly small stocky woodland species with short stout bills. Some have crests. They are adaptable birds, with a mixed diet including seeds and insects.

Common and binomial names	Image	Status in Serbia	Conservation status
Coal tit (Periparus ater)		Common resident breeder	LC
European crested tit (Lophophanes cristatus)		Fairly common resident breeder in mountain conifer forests	LC
Sombre tit (Poecile lugubris)		Fairly common resident breeder; localized in southern and eastern hilly scrublands	LC
Marsh tit (Poecile palustris)		Common resident breeder	LC
Willow tit (Poecile montanus)		Fairly common resident breeder in higher mountain woodlands	LC
Eurasian blue tit (Cyanistes caeruleus)		Abundant resident breeder	LC
Great tit (Parus major)		Abundant resident breeder	LC

== Penduline tits ==
Order: Passeriformes Family: Remizidae

The penduline tits are a group of small passerine birds related to the true tits. They are insectivores.

Common and binomial names	Image	Status in Serbia	Conservation status
Eurasian penduline tit (Remiz pendulinus)		Common resident breeder and migrant around lowland wetlands and reedbeds	LC

== Swallows ==
Order: Passeriformes Family: Hirundinidae

The family Hirundinidae is adapted to aerial feeding. They have a slender streamlined body, long pointed wings and a short bill with a wide gape. The feet are adapted to perching rather than walking, and the front toes are partially joined at the base.

Common and binomial names	Image	Status in Serbia	Conservation status
Sand martin (Riparia riparia)		Common summer visitor and breeding resident	LC
Eurasian crag martin (Ptyonoprogne rupestris)		Scarce summer visitor and breeding resident; restricted to canyons and rocky cliffs	LC
Barn swallow (Hirundo rustica)		Abundant summer visitor and breeding resident	LC
Common house martin (Delichon urbicum)		Abundant summer visitor and breeding resident	LC
Red-rumped swallow (Cecropis rufula)		Scarce summer visitor and breeding resident; expanding its range northwards	LC

== Long-tailed tits ==
Order: Passeriformes Family: Aegithalidae

Long-tailed tits are a group of small passerine birds with medium to long tails. They make woven bag nests in trees. Most eat a mixed diet which includes insects.

Common and binomial names	Image	Status in Serbia	Conservation status
Long-tailed tit (Aegithalos caudatus)		Common resident breeder; three subspecies: Aegithalos caudatus europaeus (common resident breeder); Aegithalos caudatus macedonicus (common resident breeder); Aegithalos caudatus caudatus (nominate; scarce winter visitor)	LC

== Larks ==
Order: Passeriformes Family: Alaudidae

Larks are small terrestrial birds with often extravagant songs and display flights. Most larks are fairly dull in appearance. Their food is insects and seeds.

Common and binomial names	Image	Status in Serbia	Conservation status
Woodlark (Lullula arborea)		Common resident breeder and migrant	LC
White-winged lark (Alauda leucoptera)		(A) Accidental winter vagrant	LC
Eurasian skylark (Alauda arvensis)		Abundant resident breeder and winter visitor	LC
Crested lark (Galerida cristata)		Abundant resident breeder	LC
Horned lark (Eremophila alpestris)		Common winter visitor and scarce localized resident breeder on high mountain ranges	LC
Greater short-toed lark (Calandrella brachydactyla)		Scarce summer visitor and highly localized breeding resident; migrant	LC
Calandra lark (Melanocorypha calandra)		Rare and highly localized resident breeder on the open lowlands and plains	LC
Mediterranean short-toed lark (Alaudala rufescens)		(A) Accidental vagrant	LC

== Cisticolas and allies ==
Order: Passeriformes Family: Cisticolidae

The Cisticolidae are warblers found mainly in warmer southern regions of the Old World. They are generally very small birds of drab brown or grey appearance found in open country such as grassland or scrub.

Common and binomial names	Image	Status in Serbia	Conservation status
Zitting cisticola (Cisticola juncidis)		(A) Accidental vagrant	LC

== Grassbirds and allies ==
Order: Passeriformes Family: Locustellidae

Locustellidae are a family of small insectivorous songbirds found mainly in Eurasia, Africa, and the Australian region. They are smallish birds with tails that are usually long and pointed, and tend to be drab brownish or buffy all over.

Common and binomial names	Image	Status in Serbia	Conservation status
River warbler (Locustella fluviatilis)		Fairly common summer visitor and breeder	LC
Savi's warbler (Locustella luscinioides)		Common summer visitor and breeder	LC
Common grasshopper warbler (Locustella naevia)		Scarce summer visitor and breeder	LC

== Reed warblers and allies ==
Order: Passeriformes Family: Acrocephalidae

The members of this family are average to rather large sized warblers. Most are rather plain olivaceous brown above with much yellow to beige below. They are usually found in open woodland, reedbeds, or tall grass. The family occurs mostly in southern to western Eurasia and surroundings, but it also ranges far into the Pacific, with some species in Africa.

Common and binomial names	Image	Status in Serbia	Conservation status
Eastern olivaceous warbler (Iduna pallida)		Common summer visitor and breeder	LC
Olive-tree warbler (Hippolais olivetorum)		(A) Accidental vagrant	LC
Icterine warbler (Hippolais icterina)		Fairly common summer visitor and breeder	LC
Aquatic warbler (Acrocephalus paludicola)		(A) Accidental vagrant	EN
Moustached warbler (Acrocephalus melanopogon)		Scarce resident breeder and partial migrant	LC
Sedge warbler (Acrocephalus schoenobaenus)		Common summer visitor and breeder	LC
Marsh warbler (Acrocephalus palustris)		Common summer visitor and breeder	LC
Eurasian reed warbler (Acrocephalus scirpaceus)		Common summer visitor and breeder	LC
Great reed warbler (Acrocephalus arundinaceus)		Common summer visitor and breeder	LC

== Leaf warblers ==
Order: Passeriformes Family: Phylloscopidae

Leaf warblers are a family of small insectivorous birds found mostly in Eurasia and ranging into Wallacea and Africa. The species are of various sizes, often green-plumaged above and yellow below, or more subdued with greyish-green to greyish-brown colours.

Common and binomial names	Image	Status in Serbia	Global IUCN status
Wood warbler (Phylloscopus sibilatrix)		Localized breeding summer visitor	LC
Eastern Bonelli's warbler (Phylloscopus orientalis)		(A) Accidental vagrant in Serbia	LC
Yellow-browed warbler (Phylloscopus inornatus)		(A) Very rare accidental vagrant; only one Serbian record	LC
Hume's leaf warbler (Phylloscopus humei)		(A) Accidental vagrant in Serbia	LC
Pallas's leaf warbler (Phylloscopus proregulus)		(A) Accidental vagrant in Serbia	LC
Dusky warbler (Phylloscopus fuscatus)		(A) Accidental vagrant in Serbia	LC
Willow warbler (Phylloscopus trochilus)		Common breeding summer visitor in Serbia	LC
Common chiffchaff (Phylloscopus collybita)		Abundant breeding resident and migrant	LC

== Sylviid warblers and allies ==
Order: Passeriformes Family: Sylviidae

The family Sylviidae is a group of small insectivorous warblers. They mainly occur as breeding species in Europe, Asia and Africa. Most are of generally undistinguished appearance, but many have distinctive songs.

Common and binomial names	Image	Status in Serbia	Global IUCN status
Eurasian blackcap (Sylvia atricapilla)		Abundant breeding resident and migrant	LC
Garden warbler (Sylvia borin)		Common breeding summer visitor	LC
Barred warbler (Curruca nisoria)		Fairly common breeding summer visitor	LC
Lesser whitethroat (Curruca curruca)		Common breeding summer visitor	LC
Western Orphean warbler (Curruca hortensis)		Localized breeding summer visitor	LC
Eastern orphean warbler (Curruca crassirostris)		Scarce localized breeding summer visitor	LC
Asian desert warbler (Curruca nana)		(A) Accidental vagrant in Serbia	LC
Sardinian warbler (Curruca melanocephala)		(A) Rare accidental vagrant in Serbia	LC
Eastern subalpine warbler (Curruca cantillans)		Localized breeding summer visitor	LC
Common whitethroat (Curruca communis)		Abundant breeding summer visitor	LC

== Bearded reedling ==
Order: Passeriformes Family: Panuridae

This species, the only one in its family, is found in reed beds throughout temperate Europe and Asia.

Common and binomial names	Image	Status in Serbia	Conservation status
Bearded reedling (Panurus biarmicus)		Fairly common resident breeder localized to large reedbeds	LC

== Crests ==
Order: Passeriformes Family: Regulidae

The crests, also called kinglets, are a small group of birds formerly often included in the Old World warblers, but now given family status because they are genetically well separated from warblers.

Common and binomial names	Image	Status in Serbia	Conservation status
Goldcrest (Regulus regulus)		Common resident breeder and winter visitor	LC
Common firecrest (Regulus ignicapilla)		Fairly common resident breeder and migrant	LC

== Wrens ==
Order: Passeriformes Family: Troglodytidae

The wrens are mainly small and inconspicuous except for their loud songs. These birds have short wings and thin down-turned bills. Several species often hold their tails upright. All are insectivorous.

Common and binomial names	Image	Status in Serbia	Conservation status
Eurasian wren (Troglodytes troglodytes)		Common resident breeder	LC

== Nuthatches ==
Order: Passeriformes Family: Sittidae

Nuthatches are small woodland birds, with the rock nuthatches on rocky outcrops. They have the unusual ability to climb down trees head first, unlike other birds which can only go upwards. Nuthatches have big heads, short tails and powerful bills and feet.

Common and binomial names	Image	Status in Serbia	Conservation status
Western rock nuthatch (Sitta neumayer)		(A) Accidental vagrant	LC
Eurasian nuthatch (Sitta europaea)		Common resident breeder	LC

== Wallcreeper ==
Order: Passeriformes Family: Tichodromidae

The wallcreeper is a small bird related to the nuthatch family, which has stunning crimson, grey and black plumage.

Common and binomial names	Image	Status in Serbia	Conservation status
Wallcreeper (Tichodroma muraria)		Rare winter visitor and scarce altitudinal migrant breeder	LC

== Treecreepers ==
Order: Passeriformes Family: Certhiidae

Treecreepers are small woodland birds, brown above and white below. They have thin pointed down-curved bills, which they use to extricate insects from bark. They have stiff tail feathers, like woodpeckers, which they use to support themselves on vertical trees.

Common and binomial names	Image	Status in Serbia	Conservation status
Eurasian treecreeper (Certhia familiaris)		Common resident breeder	LC
Short-toed treecreeper (Certhia brachydactyla)		Common resident breeder	LC

== Starlings ==
Order: Passeriformes Family: Sturnidae

Starlings are small to medium-sized passerine birds. Their flight is strong and direct and they are very gregarious. Their preferred habitat is fairly open country. They eat insects and fruit. Plumage is typically dark with a metallic sheen.

Common and binomial names	Image	Status in Serbia	Conservation status
Common starling (Surnus vulgaris)		Abundant resident breeder and winter visitor; two subspecies: Sturnus vulgaris vulgaris (nominate; abundant resident breeder and winter visitor); Sturnus vulgaris tauricus (Icelandic; rare migrant)	LC
Rosy starling (Pastor roseus)		Irruptive summer visitor and occasional breeder	LC

== Thrushes and allies ==
Order: Passeriformes Family: Turdidae

The thrushes are a group of passerine birds that occur mainly in the Old World. They are plump, soft plumaged, small to medium-sized insectivores or sometimes omnivores, often feeding on the ground. Many have attractive songs.

Common and binomial names	Image	Status in Serbia	Conservation status
Mistle thrush (Turdus viscivorus)		Common resident breeder	LC
Song thrush (Turdus philomelos)		Common summer visitor and breeder; some overwinter	LC
Redwing (Turdus iliacus)		Common winter visitor and passage migrant	NT
Common blackbird (Turdus merula)		Abundant resident breeder	LC
Fieldfare (Turdus pilaris)		Common winter visitor and passage migrant; rare local breeder	LC
Ring ouzel (Turdus torquatus)		Scarce summer visitor and local breeder in mountains	LC

== Old World flycatchers ==
Order: Passeriformes Family: Muscicapidae

Old World flycatchers are a large group of small passerine birds native to the Old World. They are mainly small arboreal insectivores. The appearance of these birds is highly varied, but they mostly have weak songs and harsh calls.

Common and binomial names	Image	Status in Serbia	Conservation status
Spotted flycatcher (Muscicapa striata)		Common summer visitor and breeder	LC
European robin (Erithacus rubecula)		Abundant resident breeder and winter visitor	LC
Thrush nightingale (Luscinia luscinia)		Scarce summer visitor and breeder; common passage migrant	LC
Common nightingale (Luscinia megarhynchos)		Common summer visitor and breeder	LC
Bluethroat (Luscinia svecica)		Rare resident breeder (mainly Vojvodina); passage migrant	LC
Red-flanked bluetail (Tarsiger cyanurus)		(A) Accidental vagrant	LC
Red-breasted flycatcher (Ficedula parva)		Scarce passage migrant; rare local breeder in mountain beech forests	LC
Semi-collared flycatcher (Ficedula semitorquata)		Scarce summer visitor and local breeder	LC
European pied flycatcher (Ficedula hypoleuca)		Common passage migrant; rare local breeder	LC
Collared flycatcher (Ficedula albicollis)		Common summer visitor and breeder	LC
Common redstart (Phoenicurus phoenicurus)		Common summer visitor and breeder	LC
Black redstart (Phoenicurus ochruros)		Common resident breeder and summer visitor	LC
Common rock thrush (Monticola saxatilis)		Scarce summer visitor and local breeder in rocky montane areas	LC
Blue rock thrush (Monticola solitarius)		Rare local resident breeder in river gorges	LC
Whinchat (Saxicola rubetra)		Common summer visitor and breeder	LC
European stonechat (Saxicola rubicola)		Common summer visitor and breeder; some overwinter	LC
Siberian stonechat (Saxicola maurus)		(A) Accidental migrant	LC
Northern wheatear (Oenanthe oenanthe)		Common summer visitor and breeder	LC
Isabelline wheatear (Oenanthe isabellina)		(A) Accidental vagrant	LC
Eastern black-eared wheatear (Oenanthe melanoleuca)		(A) Accidental summer visitor	LC

== Dippers ==
Order: Passeriformes Family: Cinclidae

Dippers are a group of perching birds whose habitat includes aquatic environments in the Americas, Europe and Asia. They are named for their bobbing or dipping movements.

Common and binomial names	Image	Status in Serbia	Conservation status
White-throated dipper (Cinclus cinclus)		Fairly common resident breeder along fast-flowing mountain streams	LC

== Old World sparrows ==
Order: Passeriformes Family: Passeridae

Old World sparrows are small passerine birds. In general, sparrows tend to be small, plump, brown or grey birds with short tails and short powerful beaks. Sparrows are seed eaters, but they also consume small insects.

Common and binomial names	Image	Status in Serbia	Conservation status
House sparrow (Passer domesticus)		Abundant resident breeder	LC
Spanish sparrow (Passer hispaniolensis)		Fairly common summer visitor and breeding resident	LC
Eurasian tree sparrow (Passer montanus)		Abundant resident breeder	LC
Rock sparrow (Petronia petronia)		(A) Accidental vagrant	LC
White-winged snowfinch (Montifringilla nivalis)		(A) Accidental winter vagrant	LC

== Accentors ==
Order: Passeriformes Family: Prunellidae

The accentors and dunnocks are in the only bird family, Prunellidae, which is completely endemic to the Palearctic. They are small, fairly drab species superficially similar to sparrows but with a slender bill; they are primarily insectivorous but also eat small seeds and other foods in winter.

Common and binomial names	Image	Status in Serbia	Conservation status
Alpine accentor (Prunella collaris)		Rare resident breeder on high mountains; scarce winter visitor	LC
Dunnock (Prunella modularis)		Common resident breeder and winter visitor	LC

== Wagtails and pipits ==
Order: Passeriformes Family: Motacillidae

Motacillidae is a family of small passerine birds with medium to long tails. They include the wagtails, longclaws and pipits. They are slender, ground feeding insectivores of open country.

Common and binomial names	Image	Status in Serbia	Conservation status
Grey wagtail (Motacilla cinerea)		Common resident breeder	LC
Western yellow wagtail (Motacilla flava)		Common summer visitor and breeding resident	LC
Citrine wagtail (Motacilla citreola)		(A) Accidental vagrant and rare migrant	LC
White wagtail (Motacilla alba)		Abundant resident breeder and winter visitor	LC
Richard's pipit (Anthus richardi)		(A) Accidental vagrant	LC
Tawny pipit (Anthus campestris)		Fairly common summer visitor and breeding resident	LC
Meadow pipit (Anthus pratensis)		Common migrant and winter visitor; occasional scarce breeder	NT
Tree pipit (Anthus trivialis)		Common summer visitor and breeding resident	LC
Red-throated pipit (Anthus cervinus)		Regular migrant	LC
Water pipit (Anthus spinoletta)		Common resident breeder on alpine meadows; winter visitor to lowlands	LC

== Finches, euphonias, and allies ==
Order: Passeriformes Family: Fringillidae

Finches are seed-eating passerine birds, that are small to moderately large and have a strong beak, usually conical and in some species very large. All have twelve tail feathers and nine primaries. These birds have a bouncing flight with alternating bouts of flapping and gliding on closed wings, and most sing well.

Common and binomial names	Image	Status in Serbia	Conservation status
Common chaffinch (Fringilla coelebs)		Abundant resident breeder and winter visitor	LC
Brambling (Fringilla montifringilla)		Common winter visitor and migrant	LC
Hawfinch (Coccothraustes coccothraustes)		Common resident breeder and winter visitor	LC
Common rosefinch (Carpodacus erythrinus)		Rare summer visitor and localized breeder	LC
Eurasian bullfinch (Pyrrhula pyrrhula)		Fairly common resident breeder in mountain forests; common winter visitor	LC
European greenfinch (Chloris chloris)		Abundant resident breeder and winter visitor	LC
Twite (Linaria flavirostris)		(A) Scarce and irregular winter visitor	LC
Common linnet (Linaria cannabina)		Common resident breeder and winter visitor	LC
Common redpoll (Acanthis flammea)		(A) Rare and irregular winter visitor	LC
Red crossbill (Loxia curvirostra)		Fairly common resident breeder in mountain coniferous forests; irregular irruptive visitor	LC
Two-barred crossbill (Loxia leucoptera)		(A) Accidental winter vagrant	LC
European goldfinch (Carduelis carduelis)		Abundant resident breeder and winter visitor	LC
European serin (Serinus serinus)		Common resident breeder and migrant	LC
Eurasian siskin (Spinus spinus)		Scarce resident breeder in mountains; common winter visitor and migrant	LC

== Buntings ==
Order: Passeriformes Family: Emberizidae

The buntings are a large family of passerine birds from Africa, Asia and Europe. They are seed-eating birds with distinctively shaped bills.

Common and binomial names	Image	Status in Serbia	Conservation status
Black-headed bunting (Emberiza melanocephala)		Scarce summer visitor and breeder; localized mainly to southern parts	LC
Corn bunting (Emberiza calandra)		Common resident breeder and migrant	LC
Rock bunting (Emberiza cia)		Fairly common resident breeder in rocky, mountainous terrain	LC
Cirl bunting (Emberiza cirlus)		Fairly common resident breeder; prefers sunny hillsides	LC
Yellowhammer (Emberiza citrinella)		Common resident breeder and winter visitor	LC
Ortolan bunting (Emberiza hortulana)		Scarce summer visitor and breeding resident	LC
Common reed bunting (Emberiza schoeniclus)		Common resident breeder in wetlands; common winter visitor	LC
Little bunting (Emberiza pusilla)		(A) Accidental autumn/winter vagrant	LC
Rustic bunting (Emberiza rustica)		(A) Accidental winter vagrant	VU

== Longspurs and snow buntings ==
Order: Passeriformes Family: Calcariidae

The Calcariidae are a group of passerine birds which had been traditionally grouped with the buntings, but differ in a number of respects and are usually found in open grassy areas.

Common and binomial names	Image	Status in Serbia	Conservation status
Lapland longspur (Calcarius lapponicus)		(A) Accidental winter vagrant	LC
Snow bunting (Plectrophenax nivalis)		(A) Rare winter vagrant	LC

== See also ==
- List of birds
- Lists of birds by region
