= International rankings of Serbia =

The following is a list of international rankings of Serbia.

== Economy ==
Rankings
Name	Year	Place	Out of #	Reference
CIA World Factbook – GDP per capita (PPP)	2011	105th	225	
CIA World Factbook – life expectancy	2012	101st	221	
World Economic Forum – Enabling Trade Index ranking	2008	67th	118	
Yale University / Columbia University – Environmental Performance Index	2008	29th	149	
The Economist Intelligence Unit – e-readiness	2008	–	70	
The Economist Intelligence Unit – Global Peace Index	2009	78th	144	
United States Patent and Trademark Office's list of patents by country (As FRY)	2007	44th	172	
Save the Children – Mother's Index Rank	2007	19th	141	
Save the Children – Women's Index Rank	2007	27th	141	
Save the Children – Children's Index Rank	2007	49th	141	
Wall Street Journal / The Heritage Foundation – Index of Economic Freedom	2011	98th	179	^{[unfit]}
United Nations – Human Development Index	2011	59th	179	
World Economic Forum – Global Competitiveness Report 2007–2008	2007	91st	131	
World Economic Forum – The Global Gender Gap Report 2007	2007	–	128	
World Bank – Ease of Doing Business Index	2011	92nd	183	
Reporters Without Borders – Worldwide Press Freedom Index	2008	64th	173	
Transparency International – Corruption Perceptions Index	2011	86th	182	
The Economist Intelligence Unit – Index of Democracy	2007	55th	167	
Organisation for Economic Co-operation and Development – Official Development Assistance by country as a percentage of GNI	2006	–	34	
Privacy International – Privacy index (EU and 11 other selected countries)	2006	–	36	
New Economics Foundation – Happy Planet Index	2009	58th	178	
The Economist Intelligence Unit – Quality-of-life index	2005	84th	111	
Save the Children – % seats in the national government held by women	2004	8%	141	
World Health Organization – suicide rates by country		17th	100	
Failed State Index	2010	86th	177	List of countries by Failed States Index
Press Freedom Index	2008	59th	175	Press Freedom Index

Organization	Survey	Ranking
Yale, Columbia University (at the World Economic Forum)	Environmental Performance Index	29 out of 163
Institute for Economics and Peace	Global Peace Index	78 out of 144
Reporters Without Borders	Worldwide Press Freedom Index 2009	62 out of 175
The Heritage Foundation/The Wall Street Journal	Index of Economic Freedom 2010^{[unfit]}	104 out of 179
Transparency International	Corruption Perceptions Index 2009	83 out of 180
United Nations Development Programme	Human Development Index 2009	67 out of 182
Networked Readiness Index	Networked Readiness Index 2008-2009	84 out of 134

== Education ==
- Education Index
- United Nations Development Programme: literacy rate

== Environment ==
- Yale University: Environmental Sustainability Index
- Environmental Performance Index

== Globalization ==
- A.T. Kearney/Foreign Policy Magazine: Globalization Index

== Military ==
- Institute for Economics and Peace / EIU: Global Peace Index

== Politics ==
- Transparency International: Corruption Perceptions Index
- Freedom House: Freedom of the Press (report)

== Society ==
- University of Leicester Satisfaction with Life Index
- New Economics Foundation Happy Planet Index

== Technology ==
- World Intellectual Property Organization: Global Innovation Index 2026, ranked 56 out of 139 countries

== Tourism ==
- World Economic Forum: Travel and Tourism Competitiveness Report
