= History of modern Serbia =

History of modern Serbia or modern history of Serbia covers the history of Serbia since national awakening in the early 19th century from the Ottoman Empire, then Yugoslavia, to the present day Republic of Serbia. The era follows the early modern history of Serbia.

== History of Serbia (1804–1918) ==
=== 1804–1876 ===
The history of modern Serbia began with the fight for liberation from the Ottoman occupation in 1804 (Serbian Revolution). The establishment of modern Serbia was marked by the hard-fought autonomy from the Ottoman Empire in the First Serbian Uprising in 1804 and the Second Serbian Uprising in 1815, though Turkish troops continued to garrison the capital, Belgrade, until 1867. Those revolutions revived the Serbian pride and gave them hope that their Empire might come into reality again. In 1829 Greece was given complete independence and Serbia was given its autonomy, which made her semi-independent from Turkey. Serbia's first constitution, the Sretenje or Candlemas constitution, was adopted in 1835, then replaced by the Constitution of 1838.

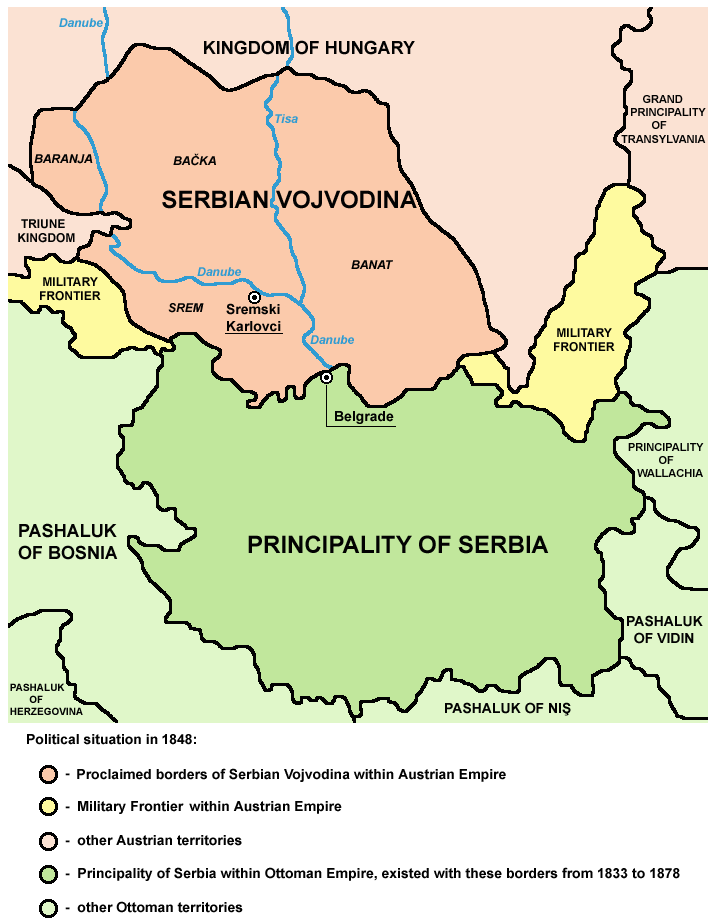
Serbian Vojvodina and Principality of Serbia in 1848

During the Revolutions of 1848, the Serbs in the Austrian Empire proclaimed a Serbian autonomous province known as Serbian Vojvodina. By a decision of the Austrian emperor in November 1849, this province was transformed into the Austrian crownland known as the Voivodeship of Serbia and Temes Banat (Dukedom of Serbia and Tamiš Banat). Against the will of the Serbs, the province was abolished in 1860, but the Serbs from the region gained another opportunity to achieve their political demands in 1918. Today, this region is known as Vojvodina.

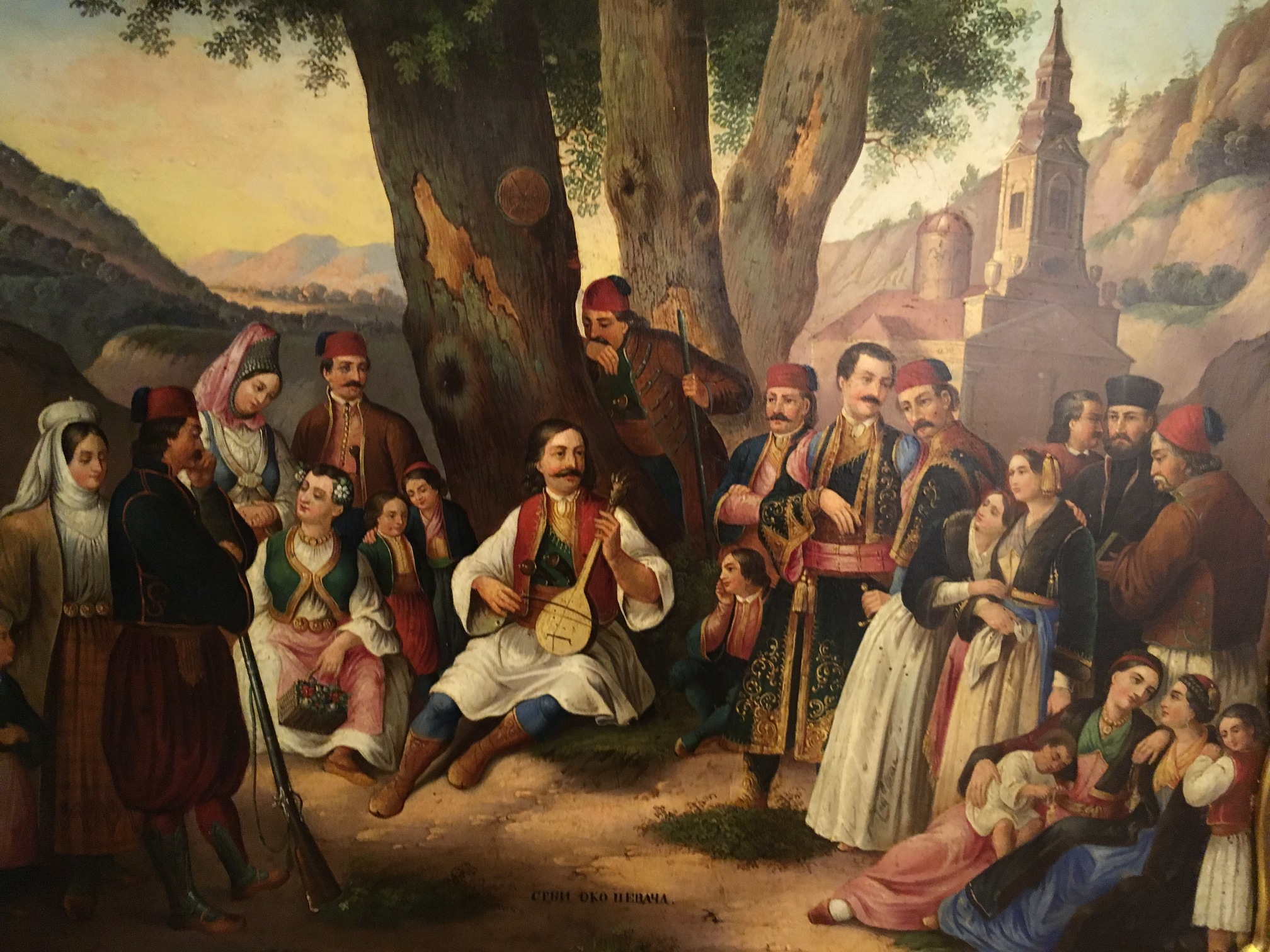
Serbs in the 19th century, by Anastas Jovanović

=== Independence 1878 ===
Serbia and Montenegro declared war on Turkey in 1876 and were badly defeated. Russia, inspired by Pan-Slavism, decided to intervene. The war alongside Russia against the Turks in 1877 achieved victory and brought full independence for Serbia and large territorial gains toward the south-east, including Niš, henceforth Serbia's second largest city. Some of the gains from the preliminary Treaty of San Stefano were reversed by the intervention of Germany, Britain and other powers at the Treaty of Berlin (1878).

The Serbian Kingdom was proclaimed in 1882, under King Milan I. Serbia was one of the rare countries at the time that had its own domestic ruling dynasty on the throne (similarly to Italy). However, millions of Serbs still lived outside Serbia, in Austro-Hungarian Empire (Herzegovina, Bosnia, Croatia, Dalmatia, Vojvodina, Sandžak) and the Ottoman Empire (Kosovo, Macedonia). Russia and Austria constantly became involved in Serbian domestic politics and foreign affairs.

The new country was, like most of the Balkan lands, poor and overwhelmingly agrarian, with little in the way of industry or modern infrastructure. The total population rose from a million in the early 19th century to 2.5 million in 1900, when Belgrade contained 100,000 inhabitants (northern part was held by Austro-Hungary), Niš 24,500 and half a dozen other cities 10–15,000 each.

Internal politics revolved largely around the dynastic rivalry between the Obrenović and Karađorđević families, descendants respectively of Miloš Obrenović (recognised as hereditary prince in 1829) and Karađorđe (Black George), leader of the 1804 revolt but killed in 1817. The Obrenovići headed the emerging state in 1817–1842 and 1858–1903, the Karađorđevići in 1842–1858 and after 1903. Milan I was ruler of Serbia from 1868 to 1889, first as prince (1868–1882), subsequently as king (1882–1889).

After the 1880s the dynastic issue became entwined to some extent with wider diplomatic divisions in Europe. King Milan I aligned his foreign policy with that of neighbouring Austria-Hungary in return for Habsburg support for his elevation to king.

=== 1900–1914 ===
The Karađorđevići inclined more toward Russia, gaining the throne in June 1903 after the bloody May Overthrow organised by a group of Army officers led by then-Captain Dragutin Dimitrijević Apis. After the 1903 coup, Serbia was securely in the Russian camp and henceforth followed a policy of irritating Austria-Hungary at every opportunity.

Serbian opposition to Austria-Hungary's October 1908 annexation of Bosnia-Herzegovina, a territory Serbia craved for itself, brought about the Bosnian crisis: German and Austro-Hungarian pressure forced Russia to prevail on Serbia (March 31, 1909) to accept the annexation, but Russia undertook to defend Serbia against any future threats to her independence.

Following Bulgaria's independence (October 1908) from Ottoman overlordship and a successful movement by Greek army officers (August 1909) to steer their government onto a more nationalistic course, Serbia joined with the other two countries and her Serb-populated neighbour Montenegro in invading (October 1912) Ottoman-held Macedonia and reducing Turkey-in-Europe to a small region around Constantinople (now Istanbul).

Bulgaria failed in her subsequent attempt (July 1913) to take from her allies territory which she had originally been promised (see Balkan Wars), and to Habsburg alarm at another near-doubling of Serbia's territory was added Bulgarian resentment at having been denied what she saw as her just share of the territorial gains.

=== Serbia in World War I ===
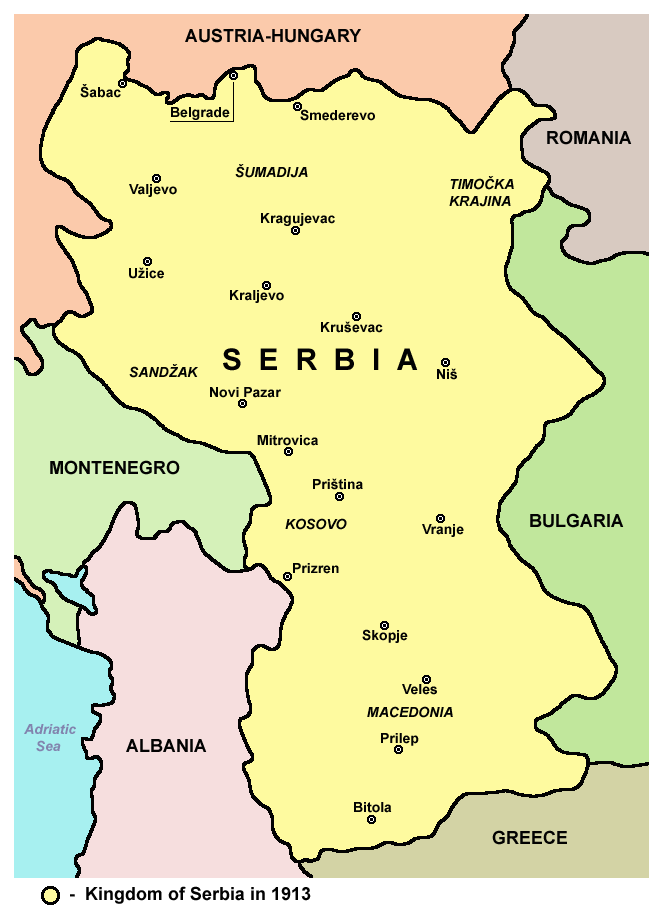
Kingdom of Serbia in 1913

On June 28, 1914, a team of seven assassins awaited the heir to the throne of the Austro-Hungarian Empire, Archduke Franz Ferdinand of Austria, at his announced visit in Sarajevo. After Nedeljko Čabrinović's first unsuccessful attack, the Bosnian Serb nationalist Gavrilo Princip assassinated the Archduke and his wife Sophie Chotek. Princip, Čabrinović and their accomplice Trifko Grabež had come from Belgrade; the three told almost all they knew to Austro-Hungarian authorities. Serbian Major Vojislav Tankosić directly and indirectly not only had provided six hand grenades, four Browning Automatic Pistols and ammunition, but also money, suicide pills, training, a special map with the location of gendarmes marked, knowledge of contacts on a special channel used to infiltrate agents and arms into Austria-Hungary, and a small card authorizing the use of that special channel. Major Tankosić confirmed to the historian Luciano Magrini that he provided the bombs and revolvers and was responsible for the self-avowed terrorists’ training, and that he initiated the idea of the suicide pills. From June 30 to July 6 Austria-Hungary and Germany made requests to Serbia directly and her through Serbia's ally Russia to open an inquiry into the plot on Serbian soil but were flatly rejected. In its July Ultimatum from July 23, Austria-Hungary asked Serbia to act in conformity with its March 1909 commitment to the Great Powers to respect the territorial integrity of Austria-Hungary and to maintain good neighborly relations, giving Serbia a 48-hour time limit. Failure to accept these demands would result in the withdrawal of Austria-Hungary's diplomatic legation from Serbia. Serbia drafted a conciliatory response, accepting all the points except point #6, demanding a criminal investigation against those participants in the conspiracy that were present in Serbia, and point #7 to allow an Austrian delegation to participate in the investigation.

Prior to issuing its reply to the Austrian Note, the Serbian army was mobilized. In response, Austria-Hungary withdrew its ambassador. It was reported that Serbian reservist soldiers on tramp steamers fired on Austro-Hungarian troops near Temes-Kubin in Hungary, on July 27. This report was false. However, together with the unsatisfactory Serbian reply to the Austrian Note and the fact that Serbia had mobilized its army before sending the reply, the report convinced the Austrian Foreign Minister, Berchtold, that the problem of Austro-Serbian tension could only be solved by war. War was formally declared on Serbia at noon on July 28, 1914, even though Serbia was not a signatory to the international convention which required this step.

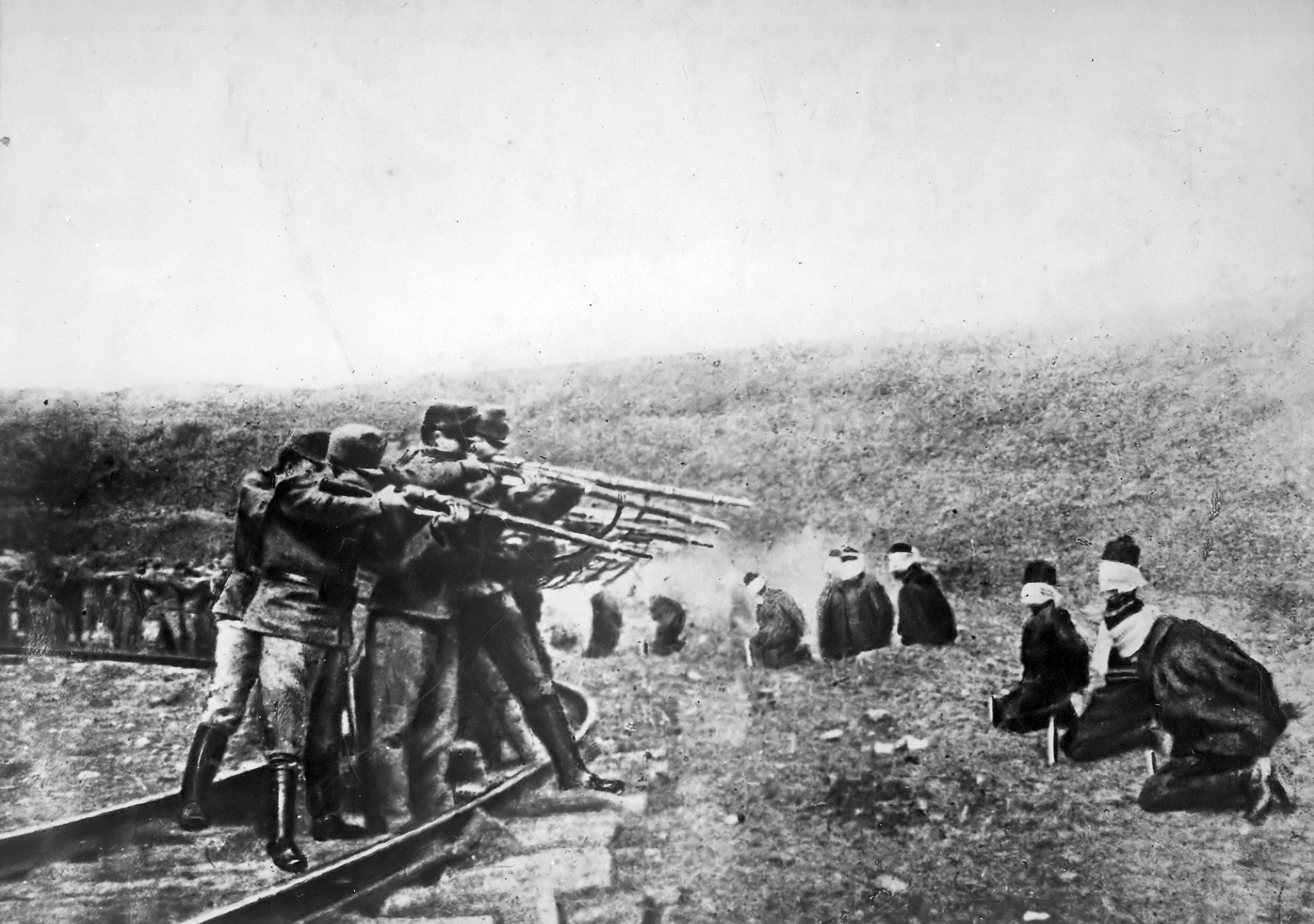
Austro-Hungarian troops executing captured Serbians, 1917. Serbia lost about 850,000 people during the war, a quarter of its pre-war population.

Serbia repulsed three Austro-Hungarian invasions (August, September and November–December 1914), in the last of which Belgrade was held temporarily by the enemy. But during 1915 an epidemic of typhus decimated the Serbian army, and renewed invasion in early October, this time involving also German and Bulgarian forces, resulted in the occupation of the whole country. The remnants of Serbia's armed forces retreated into Albania and Macedonia, where British and French forces had landed at Thessaloniki. Persecutions and deaths followed.

The period of government exile in Macedonia was marked by a significant shift in the balance of political forces. Black Hand leaders were arrested, tried, convicted (confessing their roles in the assassination) and in three cases executed on false charges (overturned posthumously). Military circles would henceforth be dominated by the royalist "White Hand" faction of Gen. Petar Živković, later prime minister (1929–32) of an extra-constitutional monarchical regime.

A successful Allied offensive in September 1918 secured first Bulgaria's surrender and then the liberation of the occupied territories (November 1918). On November 25, the Assembly of Serbs, Bunjevci, and other nations of Vojvodina in Novi Sad voted to join the region to Serbia. Also, on November 29 the National Assembly of Montenegro voted for union with Serbia, and two days later an assembly of leaders of Austria-Hungary's southern Slav regions voted to join the new State of Slovenes, Croats and Serbs (see also History of Yugoslavia). Comparing to the other European countries Serbia had by far the greatest casualties in the war, having over 30% (1,3 million) of its total population perished.

== History of Serbia since 1918 ==
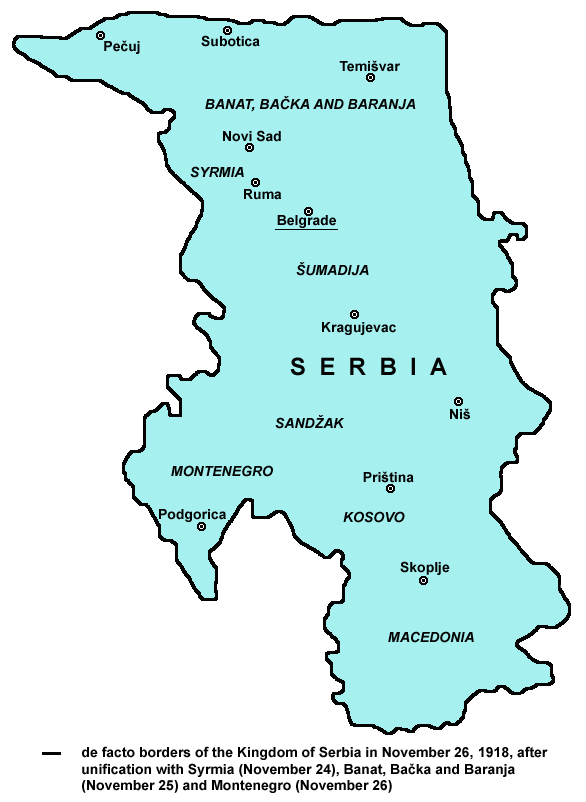
Borders of the Kingdom of Serbia on November 26, 1918, after unification with Syrmia (November 24), Banat, Bačka and Baranja (November 25) and Montenegro (November 26)

After the military victory over Austria-Hungary in the First World War, the Kingdom of Serbia was restored and was joined with other South Slavic lands formerly administered by Austria-Hungary into the newly formed Kingdom of Serbs, Croats and Slovenes (which was renamed to Yugoslavia in 1929). This new South Slavic kingdom was created on December 1, 1918, and de facto existed until the Axis invasion in 1941 (de jure until the proclamation of the republic on November 29, 1945).

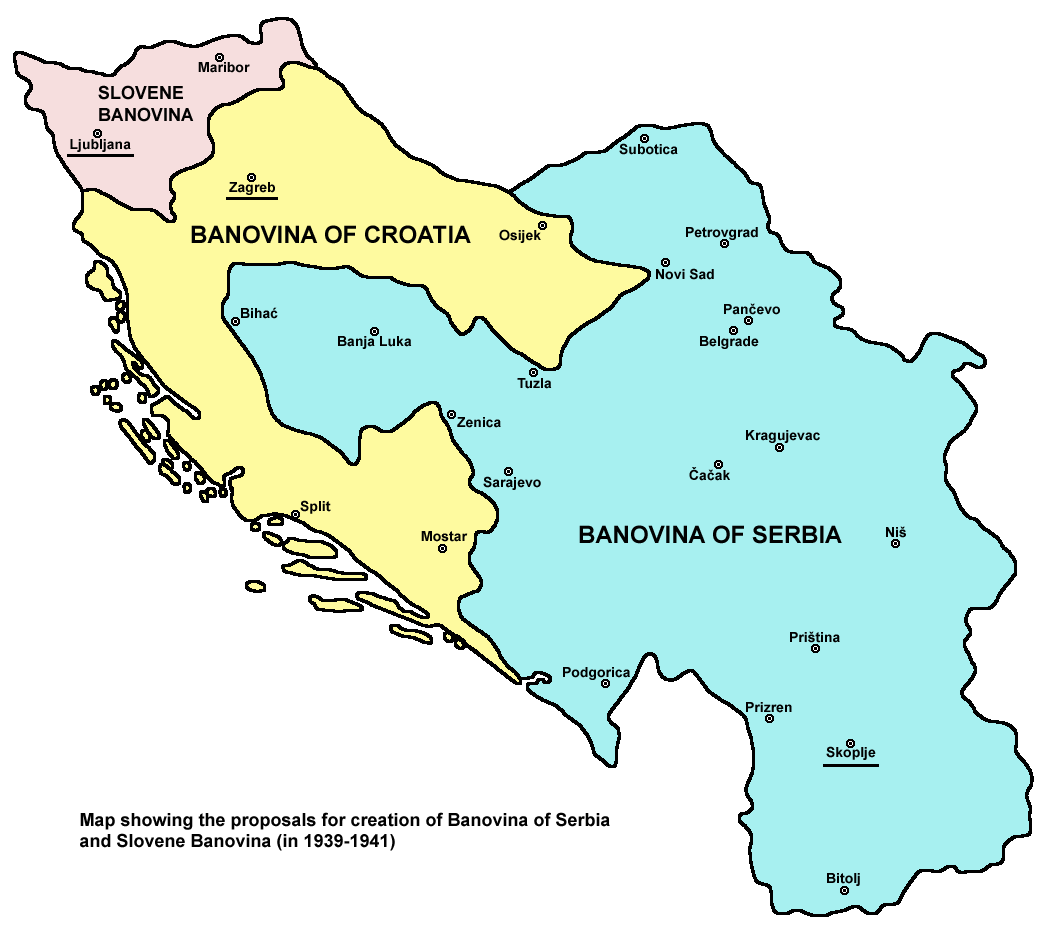
Map showing the proposals for creation of Banovina of Serbia, Banovina of Croatia and Slovene Banovina (in 1939–1941).

From 1918 to 1941, Serbia did not exist as a political entity, since the SCS Kingdom of Serbs, Croats and Slovenes (later the Kingdom of Yugoslavia) was a centralist country divided into administrative provinces that were not created in accordance with ethnic or historical criteria. However, the country was ruled by a Serb king and dominated by a Serb political elite. This triggered resentment among the Croats, whose politicians demanded federalization of the country. A Serb-Croat political compromise was achieved in 1939 when a new province known as the Banovina of Croatia was created. Some Serb intellectuals also demanded that the rest of the Yugoslav provinces (excluding the Drava Banovina) be joined into the new Banovina of Serbia, but this political project was never realized.

In 1941, after the Axis invasion and occupation of Yugoslavia, German occupational authorities created an occupied territory named Serbia and installed a Serbian puppet government there. Occupied Serbia included much of the territory of the present-day Republic of Serbia, excluding some areas that were occupied and annexed by the Independent State of Croatia, Hungary, Bulgaria, and Italy. The Banat region, which was part of occupied Serbia, had a special autonomous status and was governed by its ethnic German minority. Besides the armed forces of the Serbian pro-Axis puppet regime, two anti-Axis resistance movements operated in the territory of Serbia: the royalist Chetniks and the communist Partisans. The two resistance movements also turned one against another, which resulted in a general armed civil war in Serbia. Temporarily, in the autumn of 1941, the communist resistance movement created a short lived Republic of Užice in south-western Serbia, but this entity was soon destroyed by the joint efforts of Axis troops and pro-Axis Serbian armed forces.

In 1944, the Soviet Red Army and Yugoslav Partisans expelled all Axis troops from Serbia and the area was included into the restored Yugoslavia. Unlike pre-war Yugoslavia, which had a centralist system of government, the post-war Yugoslavia was established as a federation of six equal republics. One of the republics was Serbia, which had two autonomous provinces: Vojvodina and Kosovo. From the 1974 Yugoslav constitution, the autonomous provinces of Serbia gained extensive political rights and were represented separately from Serbia in some areas of federal government, although they were still de jure subordinated to Serbia.

The new Serbian constitution from 1990 greatly reduced the autonomy of Kosovo and Vojvodina and strengthened the central government in Serbia. After the breakup of the Socialist Federal Republic of Yugoslavia in 1991–1992, Serbia and Montenegro formed a new federation of the two republics naming it the Federal Republic of Yugoslavia. Following the clashes between the Kosovo Liberation Army and Serbian and Yugoslav authorities, as well as the NATO bombing of Yugoslavia in 1999, Kosovo became an UN protectorate. In 2003, the Federal Republic of Yugoslavia was transformed into the State Union of Serbia and Montenegro, and following the Montenegrin Independence Referendum of 2006, Serbia and Montenegro were transformed into two independent states. In 2008 Kosovo declared independence from Serbia and this was subsequently recognized by the majority of other countries in Europe and the World.

== See also ==
- History of Serbia
