= List of ecoregions in Serbia =

This is a list of ecoregions in Serbia.

== Terrestrial ==
Serbia is in the Palearctic realm. Ecoregions are listed by biome.

=== Temperate broadleaf and mixed forests ===
- Balkan mixed forests
- Dinaric Mountains mixed forests
- Pannonian mixed forests
- Rodope montane mixed forests

== Freshwater ==
- Dniester - Lower Danube
