= Bass Strait =

Sea strait between the Australian mainland and Tasmania

- Interactive map of Bass Strait
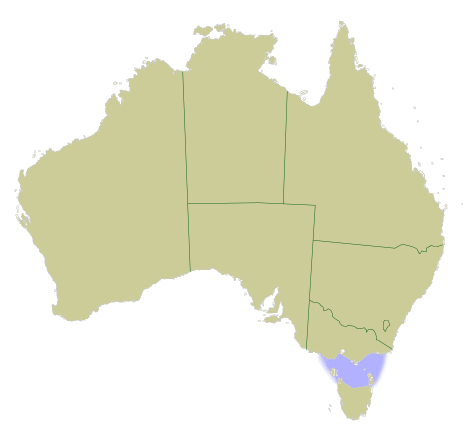
- Map of Australia with Bass Strait marked in light blue
- Location: Indian Ocean–Pacific Ocean
- Coordinates: 40°S 146°E
- Type: Strait
- Basin countries: Australia
- Max. length: 500 kilometres (310 miles)
- Max. width: 350 kilometres (220 miles)
- Average depth: 60 metres (200 ft)
- Max. depth: 155 m (509 ft)

Bass Strait is a strait separating the island state of Tasmania from the Australian mainland (more specifically the coast of Victoria, with the exception of the land border across Boundary Islet). The strait provides the most direct waterway between the Great Australian Bight and the Tasman Sea, and is also the only maritime route into the economically prominent Port Phillip Bay.

Formed 8,000 years ago by rising sea levels at the end of the last glacial period, the strait was named after English explorer and physician George Bass (1771–1803) by European colonists.

== Extent ==
The International Hydrographic Organization defines the limits of Bass Strait as follows:

On the west. The eastern limit of the Great Australian Bight [being a line from Cape Otway, Australia, to King Island and thence to Cape Grim, the northwest extreme of Tasmania].

On the east. The western limit of the Tasman Sea between Gabo Island and Eddystone Point [being a line from Gabo Island (near Cape Howe, 37°30'S) to the northeast point of East Sister Island (148°E) thence along the 148th meridian to Flinders Island; beyond this Island a line running to the Eastward of the Vansittart Shoals to [Cape] Barren Island, and from Cape Barren (the easternmost point of [Cape] Barren Island) to Eddystone Point (41°S) [in Tasmania].

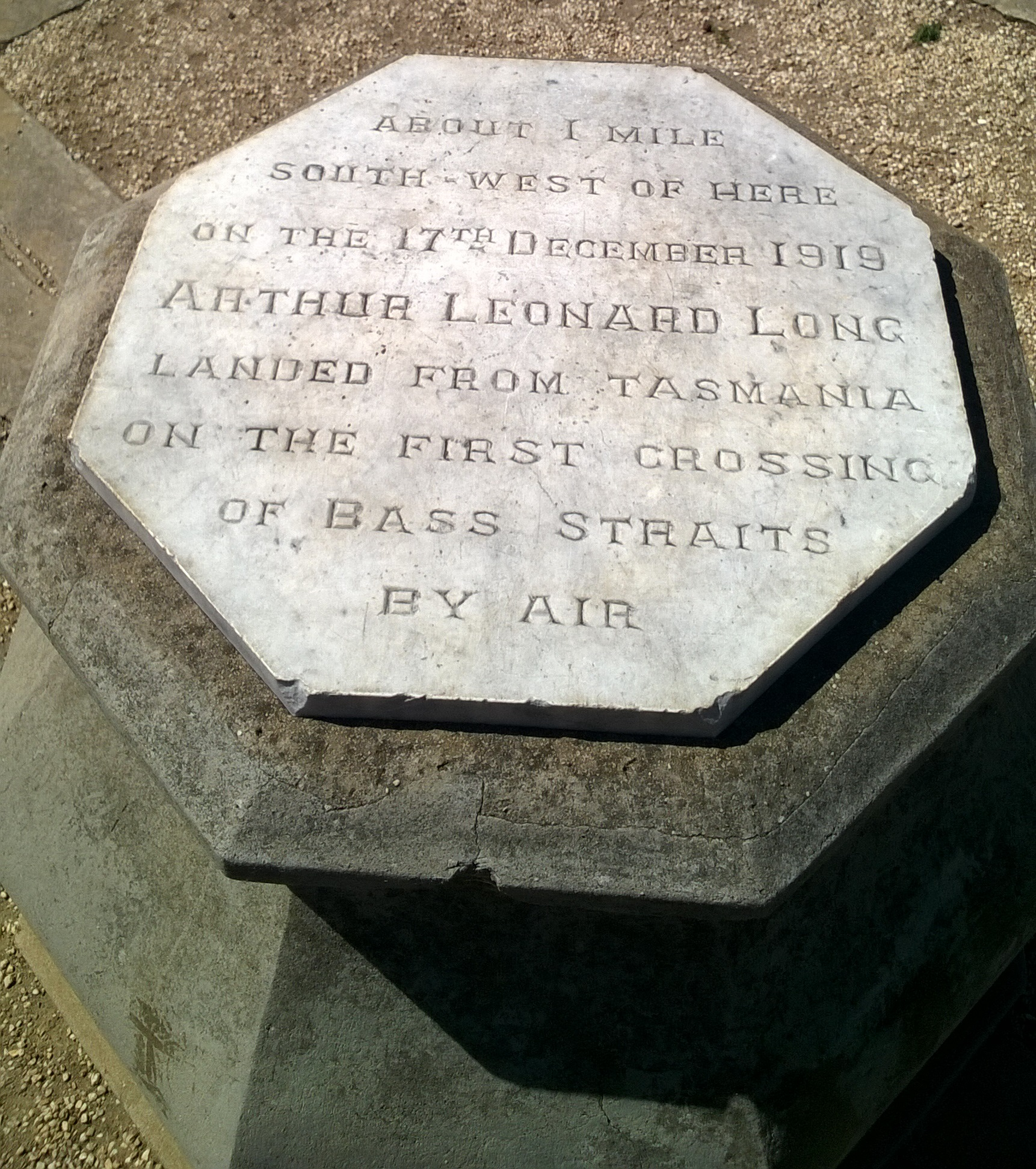
Monument commemorating the first flight across the Bass Strait, by Arthur Leonard Long in 1919. Note the spelling "Straits".

=== Differing views of location and context ===
Some authorities consider the strait to be part of the Pacific Ocean as in the never-approved 2002 IHO Limits of Oceans and Seas draft. In the currently in-force IHO 1953 draft, it is instead associated with the Great Australian Bight; the Bight is numbered 62, while the Bass Strait is designated 62-A.

The Australian Hydrographic Service does not consider it to be part of its expanded definition of the Southern Ocean, but rather states that it lies with the Tasman Sea. The strait between the Furneaux Islands and Tasmania is Banks Strait, a subdivision of Bass Strait.

== Discovery and exploration ==
=== By Aboriginal peoples ===
The shoreline of Tasmania and Victoria about 14,000 years ago as sea levels were rising, showing some of the human archaeological sites – see Prehistory of Australia

Notable past (purple) and current (orange) land bridges on a bathymetric equirectangular projection centred on 45° E

Aboriginal Tasmanians arrived in Tasmania approximately 40,000 years ago during the last glacial period, across a broad prehistoric land bridge called the Bassian Plain between the nowaday southern Victoria coastline (from Wilsons Promontory to Cape Otway) and the northern Tasmanian shores (from Cape Portland to Cape Grim). After the glacial period ended, sea levels rose and flooded the Bassian Plain to form Bass Strait at around 8,000 years ago, leaving them isolated from the Australian mainland. Aboriginal people lived on Flinders Island until around 4,000 years ago.

Based on the recorded language groups, there were at least three successive waves of Aboriginal colonisation.

=== By Europeans ===
The strait was possibly detected by Captain Abel Tasman when he charted Tasmania's coast in 1642. On 5 December Tasman was following the east coast northward to see how far it went. When the land veered to the north-west at Eddystone Point, he tried to keep in with it but his ships were suddenly hit by the Roaring Forties howling through Bass Strait. Tasman was on a mission to find the Southern Continent, not more islands, so he abruptly turned away to the east and continued his continent hunting.

The next European to approach the strait was Captain James Cook in HMS Endeavour in April 1770. However, after sailing for two hours westward towards the strait against the wind, he turned back east and noted in his journal that he was "doubtful whether they [i.e. Van Diemen's Land and New Holland] are one land or no".

The strait was named after George Bass, after he and Matthew Flinders sailed across it while circumnavigating Van Diemen's Land (now named Tasmania) in the Norfolk in 1798–99. At Flinders' recommendation, the Governor of New South Wales, John Hunter, in 1800 named the stretch of water between the mainland and Van Diemen's Land "Bass's Straits". In 1798 it became known as Bass Strait.

The existence of the strait had been suggested in 1797 by the master of Sydney Cove when he reached Sydney after deliberately grounding his foundering ship and being stranded on Preservation Island (at the eastern end of the strait). He reported that the strong south westerly swell and the tides and currents suggested that the island was in a channel linking the Pacific and southern Indian Ocean. Governor Hunter thus wrote to Joseph Banks in August 1797 that it seemed certain a strait existed.

When news of the 1798 discovery of Bass Strait reached Europe, the French government despatched a reconnaissance expedition commanded by Nicolas Baudin. This prompted Governor King to send two vessels from Sydney to the island to establish a garrison at Hobart.

== Maritime history ==
Strong currents between the Antarctic-driven southeast portions of the Indian Ocean and the Tasman Sea's Pacific Ocean waters provide a strait of powerful, wild storm waves. The shipwrecks on the Tasmanian and Victorian coastlines number in the hundreds, although stronger metal ships and modern marine navigation have greatly reduced the danger.

Many vessels, some quite large, have disappeared without a trace, or left scant evidence of their passing. Despite myths and legends of piracy, wrecking and alleged supernatural phenomena akin to those of the Bermuda Triangle, such disappearances can be invariably ascribed to treacherous combinations of wind and sea conditions, and the numerous semi-submerged rocks and reefs within the Straits.

Despite the strait's difficult waters, it provided a safer and less boisterous passage for ships on the route from Europe or India to Sydney in the early 19th century. The strait also saved 1,300 km (700 nmi) on the voyage.

== Geography ==
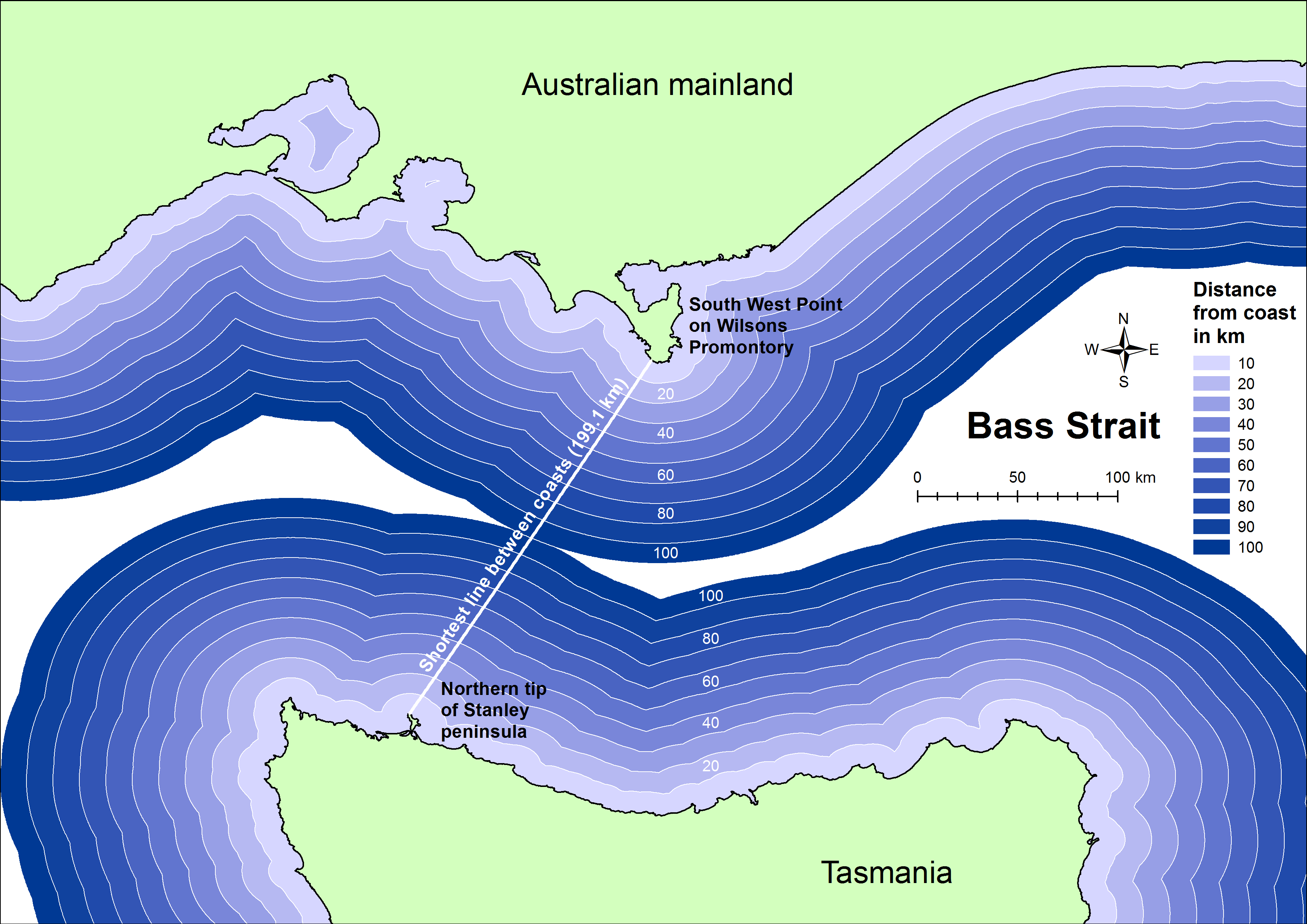
Shortest distance between the coasts of Bass Strait: South West Point on Wilsons Promontory to the northern tip of the Stanley peninsula

Bass Strait is approximately 250 km (160 mi) wide and 500 km (310 mi) long, with an average depth of 60 m (200 ft). The widest opening is about 350 km (220 mi) between Cape Portland on the northeastern tip of Tasmania and Point Hicks on the Australian mainland. Bass Canyon, one of the largest submarine canyons in the world, is situated on the eastern periphery of the strait.

Jennings' study of the submarine topography of Bass Strait described the bathymetric Bass Basin, a shallow depression approximately 120 km (70 mi) wide and 400 km (250 mi) long (over 65,000 km^{2} [25,000 sq mi] in area) in the centre of Bass Strait, a maximum depth is the channel between Inner Sister Island and Flinders Island, which navigation charts indicate reaches 155 m (510 ft). Two underwater plateaus, the Bassian Rise and King Island Rise located on the eastern and western margins of Bass Strait, respectively, are composed of a basement of Paleozoic granite. These features form sills separating Bass Basin from the adjacent ocean basins. Associated with the less than 50 m (160 ft)-deep Bassian Rise is the Furneaux Islands, the largest of which is Flinders Island (maximum elevation 760 m [2,490 ft]). The surface of the King Island Rise also occurs in water depths of less than 50 m (160 ft), and includes the shallow (40 m [130 ft]) Tail Bank at its northern margin as well as King Island itself. Subaqueous dunes (sandwaves) and tidal current ridges cover approximately 6,000 km^{2} (2,300 sq mi) of the seabed in Bass Strait.

During Pleistocene, low sea level stands the central basin of Bass Strait was enclosed by raised sills forming a large shallow lake. This occurred during the last glacial maximum (18,000 BP) when the basin was completely isolated. Sea level rise during the marine transgression flooded the basin, forming a westward embayment from 11,800 BP to 8700 BP, and the basin rim was completely flooded by about 8000 BP, at which point Bass Strait was formed and Tasmania became an isolated island.

Like the rest of the waters surrounding Tasmania, and particularly because of its limited depth, it is notoriously rough, with many ships lost there during the 19th century. A lighthouse was erected on Deal Island in 1848 to assist ships navigating in the eastern part of the Straits, but there were no guides to the western entrance until the Cape Otway Lighthouse was first lit in 1848, followed by another at Cape Wickham at the northern end of King Island in 1861.

== Islands ==
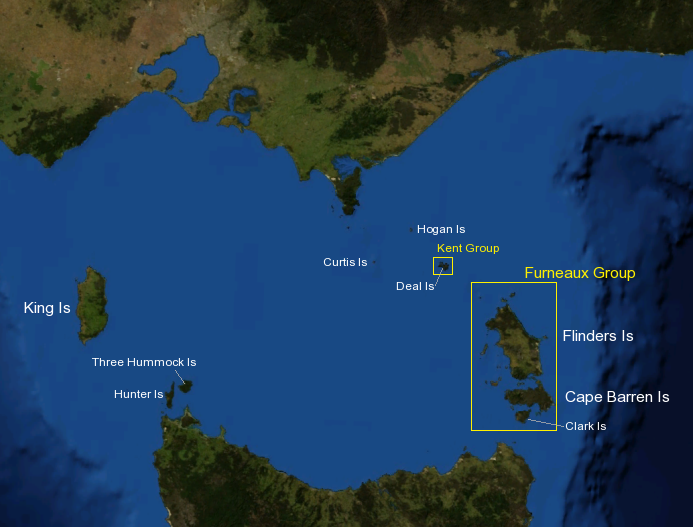
Map of Bass Strait including major island groups

There are over 50 islands in Bass Strait. Major islands include:

Western section:

- King Island
- Three Hummock Island
- Hunter Island
- Robbins Island

South eastern section:

- Furneaux Group
  - Flinders Island (where the surviving Aboriginal Tasmanians were exiled)
  - Cape Barren Island
  - Clarke Island
  - Sister Islands Group
  - and several other islands

North eastern section:

- Kent Group
  - Deal Island
  - and 3 smaller islands
- Hogan Island
- Curtis Island

== Protected areas ==
=== Federal ===
Within Bass Strait there are several Commonwealth marine reserves, which are all part of the South-east Network. The two larger reserves, Flinders and Zeehan, extend mostly outside of the Bass Strait area.

- Apollo
- Beagle
- Boags
- East Gippsland
- Flinders
- Franklin
- Zeehan

=== State ===
The smaller islands of Bass Strait typically have some form of protection status. Most notably the Kent Group National Park covers the Kent Group islands of Tasmania, as well as the surrounding state waters which is a dedicated marine reserve. The national park is wholly contained by the Beagle Commonwealth Marine Reserve.

Victoria has several marine national parks in Bass Strait, and are all adjacent to the mainland coastline:

- Bunurong
- Ninety Mile Beach
- Point Addis
- Port Phillip Heads
- Twelve Apostles
- Wilsons Promontory

== Natural resources ==
A number of oil and gas fields exist in the eastern portion of Bass Strait, in what is known as the Gippsland Basin. Most large fields were discovered in the 1960s, and are located about 50 to 65 km (30 to 40 mi) off the coast of Gippsland in water depths of about 70 m (230 ft). These oil fields include the Halibut Field discovered in 1967, the Cobia Field discovered in 1972, the Kingfish Field, the Mackerel Field, and the Fortescue Field discovered in 1978. Large gas fields include the Whiptail field, the Barracouta Field, the Snapper Field, and the Marlin Field. Oil and gas are produced from the Cretaceous-Eocene clastic rocks of the Latrobe Group, deposited with the break-up of Australia and Antarctica. In 2020 activist group No Gas Across the Bass was set up after American company ConocoPhillips put in an application to seismic blast 27km from King Island. Further environmental campaigning followed the Australian government's 2020 Oil and Gas acreage release as this opened up new areas of Tasmania's oceans for exploration.

The western field, known as the Otway Basin, was discovered in the 1990s offshore near Port Campbell. Its exploitation began in 2005.

The oil and gas is sent via pipeline to gas processing facilities and oil refineries at Longford (Longford gas plant), Western Port (Westernport Refinery closed 1985), Altona (Altona Refinery scheduled to close in 2021) and Geelong (Geelong Oil Refinery), as well as by tanker to New South Wales. Pipelines from the Otway Basin gas fields lead to several processing facilities in the vicinity of Port Campbell (Iona Gas Plant and Otway Gas Plant).

In June 2017, the Government of Victoria announced a three-year feasibility study for Australia's first offshore wind farm. The project, which could have 250 wind turbines within a 574 km^{2} (222 sq mi) area, is projected to deliver around 8,000 GWh of electricity, representing some 18 per cent of Victoria's power usage and replacing a large part of the output of Hazelwood Power Station, which was closed in early 2017.

== Infrastructure ==
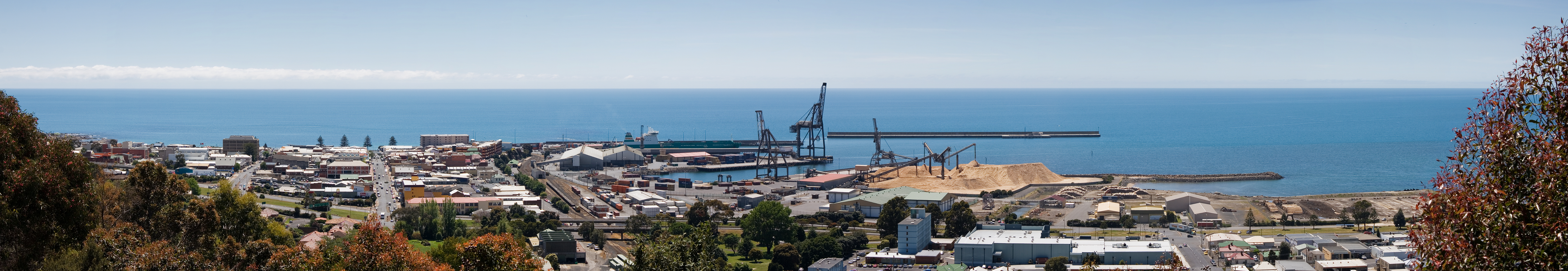
Burnie CBD and Port from Wilfred Campbell Memorial Reserve with Bass Strait behind

=== Transport ===
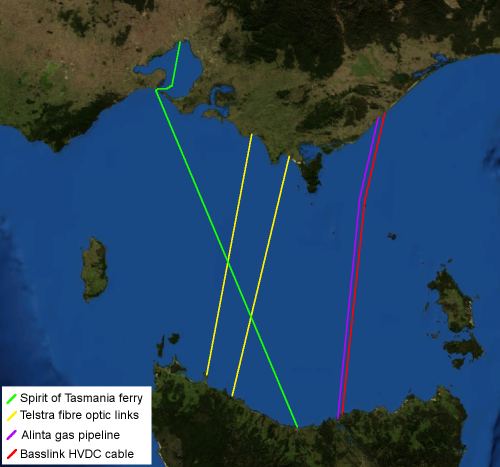
Major infrastructure connections between Tasmania and Victoria.

The fastest and often the cheapest method of travel across Bass Strait is by air. The major airports in Tasmania are Hobart Airport and Launceston Airport, where the main airlines are Jetstar and Virgin Australia. Qantas also operates services. The smaller airports in the north of the state and on the islands in the strait are served either by Rex Airlines, QantasLink or King Island Airlines.

Commercial Freight

Major commercial freight operator SeaRoad, complete daily sailings between Devonport and Port Melbourne Mon-Sat.

==== Ferries ====
The domestic sea route is serviced by two Spirit of Tasmania passenger vehicle ferries, based in Devonport, Tasmania. The ships travel daily between Devonport and Spirit of Tasmania Quay in Geelong as overnight trips, with additional daytime trips during the peak summer season.

==== Proposed tunnel ====
A tunnel across the Bass Strait has been proposed; in 2013, the Tasmanian government said that it "should not be discounted".

=== Energy ===
The Basslink HVDC electrical cable has been in service since 2006. It has the capacity to carry up to 630 megawatts of electrical power across the strait.

Alinta owns a submarine gas pipeline, delivering natural gas to large industrial customers near George Town, as well as the Powerco gas network in Tasmania.

=== Communications ===
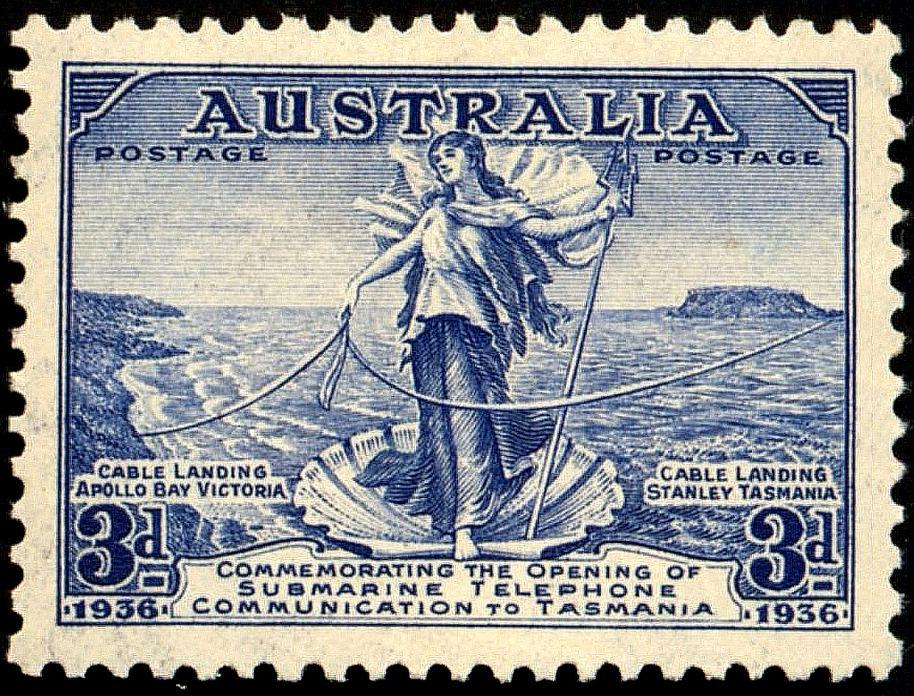
Amphitrite on 1936 stamp commemorating completion of cable

The first submarine communications cable across Bass Strait was laid in 1859. Starting at Cape Otway, Victoria, it went via King Island and Three Hummock Island, made contact with the Tasmanian mainland at Stanley Head, and then continued on to George Town. It started failing within a few weeks of completion, and by 1861 it failed completely.

Tasmania is currently connected to the mainland via two Telstra-operated fibre optic cables; since 2006, dark fibre capacity has also been available on the Basslink HVDC cable.

Other submarine cables include:

Date	Northern end	Southern end	Companies (Manufacturer / Operator)	Details
1859–1861	Cape Otway	Stanley Head	Henley's Telegraph Works; Tas & Vic Govts	System 260 km (140 nmi)
1869–(?1889)/1909	Cape Schanck	Low Head	Henley's Telegraph Works; Australian Govt	System 326 km (176 nmi); Recovered and redeployed in 1909
1885–1909	Cape Schanck	Low Head	Telcon; Australian Government	Recovered and redeployed in 1909
1889–?	Cape Schanck	Low Head	Telcon; Australian Government	
1909–1943	?		Siemens Brothers; Australian Government	System 528 km (285 nmi); Was reused at Torres Strait
1936	Apollo Bay	Stanley	Siemens Brothers; Australian Government	First telephone cable, failed after only six months
1995–	Sandy Point	Boat Harbour	ASN; Telstra	First fibre optic cable
2003–	Inverloch	Stanley	ASN Calais; Telstra	
2005–	Loy Yang	George Town	Basslink	First electrical transmission cable

== Popular culture ==
In 1978, one of the most famous UFO incidents in Australian history occurred over Bass Strait. Frederick Valentich was flying a small aeroplane over the strait when he reported to personnel at a local airport that a strange object was buzzing his plane. He then claimed that the object had moved directly in front of his plane; the airport personnel then heard a metallic "scraping" sound, followed by silence. Valentich and his plane subsequently vanished and neither Valentich nor his plane were ever seen again.

The issue of planes, ships and people having been lost in the strait over time has spawned a number of theories. Perhaps the most thorough list of losses and disappearances has been the oft reprinted book of Jack Loney though it is possible that most losses can be adequately explained by extreme weather events.

On the popular Australian soap Neighbours, one of its most dramatic storylines unfolded when a 1940s themed joy flight to Tasmania was sabotaged by a bomb. The plot involved the plane crashing into Bass Strait in the middle of the night and many characters' lives being put at risk, with some drowning.

In Nevil Shute's classic Australian novel On the Beach, American Submarine Captain Dwight Towers heads for the Bass Strait with plans to scuttle the ship as he and his crew begin succumbing to radiation poisoning.

== Non-motorised crossings ==
Bass Strait is regularly crossed by sailing vessels, including during the annual Melbourne to Hobart Yacht Race. The Sydney to Hobart Yacht Race passes generally east of the strait but is affected by its weather conditions.

=== Sailing ===
The first windsurfer crossing was in 1982 by Mark Paul and Les Tokolyi. In 1998 Australian offshore sailor Nick Moloney took on a different challenge by being the first person to windsurf unaided across the Bass Strait in a time of 22 hours.

In terms of dinghy sailing many crossings have been made but in March 2005 Australian Olympic medallist Michael Blackburn set a record when he crossed the strait in just over 13 hours in a Laser sailing dinghy.

In March 2009 two young dinghy sailors sailed a B14 (dinghy) from Stanley in north west Tasmania to Walkerville South in Victoria. The purpose of the voyage was to raise funds for the treatment of the endangered Tasmanian Devil, an animal species suffering from a facial tumour disease and, if possible, break the dinghy sailing time record for the crossing. The sailors Adrian Beswick and Josh Philips accompanied by a support vessel successfully completed the crossing in 14 hours 53 minutes.

Kitesurfers have also completed the crossing with Natalie Clark in 2010 become the first female to do the crossing.

=== Rowing / Paddling ===
In 1971 lone rower David Bowen from Mount Martha crossed Bass Strait in a 6.1 m (20 ft) dory. Leaving from Devonport he landed on Wilson's Promontory.

The first crossing by paddleboard was made by Jack Bark, Brad Gaul and Zeb Walsh, leaving Wilsons Promontory in Victoria on 25 February 2014 and arriving at Cape Portland in northeastern Tasmania on 4 March 2014.

Rod Harris, Ian and Peter Richards are credited with the first kayak crossing in 1971. Many sea kayakers have since made the crossing, usually by island hopping on the eastern side of the strait. Fewer sea kayak crossings have been made via King Island, due to the 100 km (60 mi) leg between Cape Wickam and Apollo Bay. Andrew McAuley was the first person to cross Bass Strait non-stop in a sea kayak in 2003. He made two more crossings of Bass Strait before he died attempting to cross the Tasman Sea in February 2007. In total, roughly 300 people have crossed bass strait by kayak in modern times.

=== Swimming ===
Tammy van Wisse swam part of the strait in 1996, from King Island to Apollo Bay in Victoria, a distance of about 100 km (60 mi) in 17 hours and 46 minutes.

== See also ==
- List of Bass Strait crossings by air
- South-east Commonwealth Marine Reserve Network
