= Gascoyne Marine Park =

Australian marine park west of the Cape Range Peninsula, Western Australia

- IUCN category IV (habitat/species management area)
- Map showing the Gascoyne Marine Park. The shaded area is a National Park Zone ('no take' zone).
- Location: Australia
- Coordinates: 22.3756°S 112.0080°E
- Area: 81,766 km^{2} (31,570 sq mi)
- Established: 1 July 2018
- Operator: Parks Australia
- Website: https://parksaustralia.gov.au/marine/parks/north-west

The Gascoyne Marine Park (formerly known as the Gascoyne Commonwealth Marine Reserve) is an Australian marine park offshore of Western Australia, west of the Cape Range Peninsula. The marine park covers an area of 81,766 km^{2} (31,570 sq mi) and shares its far eastern boundary with the Ningaloo Marine Park (Commonwealth waters). The park is assigned IUCN category IV and is one of the 13 parks managed under the North-west Marine Parks Network.

== Conservation values ==
=== Species and habitat ===
- Foraging areas for vulnerable and migratory whale sharks.
- Foraging areas and adjacent to important nesting sites for marine turtles
- Includes part of the migratory pathway of the protected humpback whale.

=== Bioregions and ecology ===
- The reserve includes shallow shelf environments and provides protection for shelf and slope habitats, as well as pinnacle and terrace seafloor features
- Examples of the seafloor habitats and communities of the Central Western Shelf Transition provincial bioregion.

== History ==
The marine park was proclaimed under the EPBC Act on 14 December 2013 and renamed Gascoyne Marine Park on 9 October 2017. The management plan and protection measures of the marine park came into effect for the first time on 1 July 2018.

== Summary of protection zones ==
The Gascoyne Marine Park has been assigned IUCN protected area category IV. However, within the marine park there are three protection zones, each zone has an IUCN category and related rules for managing activities to ensure the protection of marine habitats and species.

The following table is a summary of the zoning rules within the Gascoyne Marine Park:

Zone	IUCN	Activities permitted						Total area (km^{2})
Zone	IUCN	Vessel transiting	Recreational fishing	Commercial fishing	Commercial aquaculture	Commercial tourism	Mining	Total area (km^{2})
National Park	II	Yes	No	No	No	excludes fishing, with approval	No	36,050
Habitat Protection	IV	Yes	Yes	most, with approval	with approval	with approval	No	6,929
Multiple Use	VI	Yes	Yes	most, with approval	with approval	with approval	with approval	108,812
External link: Zoning and rules for the North-west Marine Parks Network

== See also ==
- Protected areas managed by the Australian government
