= Boags Commonwealth Marine Reserve =

Australian marine protected area in Bass Strait off north-west Tasmania

- IUCN category VI (protected area with sustainable use of natural resources)
- Map showing the Boags Commonwealth Marine Reserve
- Location: Bass Strait, Australia
- Nearest town: Stanley, Tasmania
- Coordinates: 40.23°S 144.99°E
- Area: 537 km^{2} (207 sq mi)
- Established: 31 August 2007
- Governing body: Parks Australia (Commonwealth of Australia)
- Website: environment.gov.au/topics/marine/marine-reserves/south-east/boags

Boags Commonwealth Marine Reserve is a 537 km^{2} marine protected area within Australian waters located off the coast of north-west Tasmania in Bass Strait. The reserve was established in 2007, and is the smallest reserve of the South-east Commonwealth Marine Reserve Network.

The reserve is a sample of the bottom-dwelling creatures that live in the sea-floor sediments and muds of Bass Strait, such as crustaceans, polychaete worms, and molluscs. It is an important foraging area for a variety of seabirds that nest on the nearby islands, particularly the Hunter Island Group which includes Three Hummock Island.

== Protection ==
The entirety of the Boags marine reserve area is IUCN protected area category VI and zoned as 'Multiple Use'.

Zone	IUCN	Activities permitted			Area (km^{2})
Zone	IUCN	Recreational fishing	Commercial fishing	Mining	Area (km^{2})
Multiple Use	VI	Yes	with approval	with approval	537
(Note: Summary of permitted activities only, see source for details)

== See also ==
- Commonwealth marine reserves
- Protected areas of Australia
