= Norfolk Marine Park =

Australian marine park offshore of Norfolk Island

- IUCN category IV (habitat/species management area)
- Map showing the Norfolk Marine Park. The shaded area is a National Park Zone ('no take' zone).
- Location: Australia
- Coordinates: 29.219°S 168.223°E
- Area: 188,444 km^{2} (72,759 sq mi)
- Established: 1 July 2018
- Operator: Parks Australia
- Website: https://parksaustralia.gov.au/marine/parks/temperate-east

The Norfolk Marine Park (formerly known as the Norfolk Commonwealth Marine Reserve) is an Australian marine park located in the waters immediately offshore of Norfolk Island, an external territory of Australia. The marine park extends 700 km (430 mi) in a north–south direction and covers an area of 188,444 km^{2} (72,759 sq mi). The park is assigned IUCN category IV and is one of 8 parks managed under the Temperate East Marine Parks Network.

== Conservation values ==
=== Species and habitat ===
- Biologically important areas for protected humpback whales and a number of migratory seabirds.
- The Tasman Front is a region of intermediate productivity that separates the warm, nutrient-poor waters of the Coral Sea from the cold, nutrient-rich waters of the Tasman Sea. It supports high productivity; aggregations of marine life; biodiversity and endemism in the region.
- Includes benthic habitats thought to act as stepping stones for faunal dispersal, connecting deep-water fauna from New Caledonia to New Zealand.

=== Bioregions and ecology ===
- Examples of the ecosystems of the Norfolk Island Province provincial bioregion.
- Represents bank/shoals, basin, canyon, deep/hole/valley, knoll/abyssal-hills/hills/mountains/peak, pinnacle, plateau, ridge, saddle, seamount/guyot, shelf, slope, trench/trough.
- Norfolk Ridge (high productivity, aggregations of marine life; biodiversity and endemism).

== History ==
The marine park was proclaimed under the EPBC Act on 14 December 2013 and renamed Norfolk Marine Park on 9 October 2017. The management plan and protection measures of the marine park came into effect for the first time on 1 July 2018.

== Summary of protection zones ==
The Norfolk Marine Park has been assigned IUCN protected area category IV. However, within the marine park there are three protection zones, each zone has an IUCN category and related rules for managing activities to ensure the protection of marine habitats and species.

The following table is a summary of the zoning rules within the Norfolk Marine Park:

Zone	IUCN	Activities permitted						Total area (km^{2})
Zone	IUCN	Vessel transiting	Recreational fishing	Commercial fishing	Commercial aquaculture	Commercial tourism	Mining	Total area (km^{2})
National Park	II	Yes	No	No	No	excludes fishing, with approval	No	41,661
Habitat Protection	IV	Yes	Yes	most, with approval	with approval	with approval	No	138,796
Special Purpose (Norfolk)	VI	Yes	Yes	most, with approval	with approval	with approval	No	7,986
External link: Zoning and rules for the Temperate East Marine Parks Network

== See also ==
- Protected areas managed by the Australian government
