= Beagle Commonwealth Marine Reserve =

Australian marine protected area in the Bass Strai off Victoria

- IUCN category VI (protected area with sustainable use of natural resources)
- Map showing the Beagle Commonwealth Marine Reserve
- Location: Bass Strait, Australia
- Nearest town: Tidal River, Victoria
- Coordinates: 39.34°S 147.12°E
- Area: 2,928 km^{2} (1,131 sq mi)
- Established: 31 August 2007
- Governing body: Parks Australia (Commonwealth of Australia)
- Website: environment.gov.au/topics/marine/marine-reserves/south-east/beagle

Beagle Commonwealth Marine Reserve is a 2,928 km^{2} marine protected area within Australian waters located in Bass Strait off the coast of Victoria and near Tasmania's Flinders Island. The reserve was established in 2007 and is part of the South-east Commonwealth Marine Reserve Network.

The reserve boundaries enclose Kent Group National Park and the Hogan and Curtis Island groups. Nearby to the north-east is Wilsons Promontory Marine National Park. The reserve represents an area of shallow continental shelf ecosystems in depths of about 50–70 m (160–230 ft), the sea floor that it covers formed part of a land bridge between Tasmania and Victoria during the last ice age 10 000 years ago.

== Protection ==
The entirety of the Beagle marine reserve is IUCN protected area category VI and zoned as "Multiple Use".

Zone	IUCN	Activities permitted			Area (km^{2})
Zone	IUCN	Recreational fishing	Commercial fishing	Mining	Area (km^{2})
Multiple Use	VI	Yes	with approval	with approval	2,928
(Note: Summary of permitted activities only, see source for details)

== Shipwrecks ==
Located within the Beagle marine reserve are the wrecks of the SS Cambridge (sunk by German WWII mine) and Eliza Davis, both are east of Wilson's Promontory.

== Gallery ==
The Bassian Plain was a land bridge that connected Tasmania to mainland Australia

== See also ==
- Commonwealth marine reserves
- Protected areas of Australia
