= Freycinet Commonwealth Marine Reserve =

Australian marine protected area east of Tasmania

- IUCN category II (national park)
- Map showing the Freycinet Commonwealth Marine Reserve
- Location: Tasman Sea, Australia
- Nearest town: Bicheno, Tasmania
- Coordinates: 42.19°S 151.12°E
- Area: 57,942 km^{2} (22,372 sq mi)
- Established: August 31, 2007
- Governing body: Parks Australia (Commonwealth of Australia)
- Website: parksaustralia.gov.au/marine/parks/south-east/freycinet/

Freycinet Commonwealth Marine Reserve is a 57,942 km^{2} marine protected area within Australian waters located off the east coast of Tasmania. It extends to the outer limits of the Australian exclusive economic zone in the Tasman Sea. The reserve was established in 2007 and is part of the South-east Commonwealth Marine Reserve Network. It is the largest reserve of the South-east Network, the area covered is approximately equivalent to about 86% of the land area of Tasmania.

Several large offshore seamounts believed to be too deep to have been fished are within the reserved area. Seamounts generally host a wide variety of habitats that support deep ocean biodiversity, the large seamounts to the east of Tasmania are individually important, as they are expected to include endemic species. The shallower regions of the reserve includes habitat important to seabirds. Great white shark also forage in the reserve.

== Protection ==
Most of the Freycinet marine reserve area is IUCN protected area category II. A small portion near the coast is zoned as 'Recreational Use' (IUCN IV) and 'Multiple Use' (IUCN VI).

Zone	IUCN	Activities permitted			Area (km^{2})
Zone	IUCN	Recreational fishing	Commercial fishing	Mining	Area (km^{2})
Marine National Park	II	No	No	No	56,793
Recreational Use	IV	Yes	No	No	323
Multiple Use	VI	Yes	with approval	with approval	826
(Note: Summary of permitted activities only, see source for details)

== See also ==
- Commonwealth marine reserves
- Protected areas of Australia
- Pacific Ocean
