= Franklin Commonwealth Marine Reserve =

Australian marine protected area off north-west Tasmania

- IUCN category VI (protected area with sustainable use of natural resources)
- Map showing the Franklin Commonwealth Marine Reserve
- Location: Indian Ocean, Australia
- Nearest town: Marrawah, Tasmania
- Coordinates: 40.76°S 144.28°E
- Area: 671 km^{2} (259 sq mi)
- Established: August 31, 2007
- Governing body: Parks Australia (Commonwealth of Australia)
- Website: environment.gov.au/topics/marine/marine-reserves/south-east/franklin

Franklin Commonwealth Marine Reserve is a 671 km^{2} marine protected area within Australian waters located off the west coast of north-west Tasmania. The reserve was established in 2007 and is part of the South-east Commonwealth Marine Reserve Network.

The area incorporates two major bioregions: western Bass Strait and the Tasmanian shelf. To the north of the reserve is Black Pyramid Rock, which supports the largest breeding colony of the Australasian gannet in Tasmania.

== Protection ==
The entirety of the Franklin marine reserve area is IUCN protected area category VI and zoned as 'Multiple Use'.

Zone	IUCN	Activities permitted			Area (km^{2})
Zone	IUCN	Recreational fishing	Commercial fishing	Mining	Area (km^{2})
Multiple Use	VI	Yes	with approval	with approval	671
(Note: Summary of permitted activities only, see source for details)

== See also ==
- Commonwealth marine reserves
- Protected areas of Australia
- Great Australian Bight
