= South Tasman Rise Commonwealth Marine Reserve =

Marine protected area south of Tasmania

- IUCN category VI (protected area with sustainable use of natural resources)
- Map showing the South Tasman Rise Commonwealth Marine Reserve
- Location: Pacific Ocean, Australia
- Coordinates: 46.28°S 149.49°E
- Area: 27,704 km^{2} (10,697 sq mi)
- Established: August 31, 2007
- Governing body: Parks Australia (Commonwealth of Australia)
- Website: environment.gov.au/topics/marine/marine-reserves/south-east/south-tasman-rise

South Tasman Rise Commonwealth Marine Reserve is a 27,704 km^{2} marine protected area located at the southerly limit of Australia's exclusive economic zone near Tasmania. The reserve was established in 2007 and is part of the South-east Commonwealth Marine Reserve Network.

The reserve contains part of the South Tasman Rise seafloor and covers the deep ocean, including a section of the mid-continental slope at depths of 1,200–3,000 m (3,900–9,800 ft). Some of the seamounts within the reserve have flat summits, which indicates that they were exposed above the surface at some time.

== Protection ==
The entirety of the South Tasman Rise marine reserve area is IUCN protected area category VI and is zoned as 'Special Purpose'.

Zone	IUCN	Activities permitted			Area (km^{2})
Zone	IUCN	Recreational fishing	Commercial fishing	Mining	Area (km^{2})
Special Purpose	VI	Yes	No	with approval	27,704
(Note: Summary of permitted activities only, see source for details)

== See also ==
- Commonwealth marine reserves
- Protected areas of Australia
- Tasman Sea
