= Gulf of Carpentaria Marine Park =

Australian marine park in the Gulf of Carpentaria, offshore of Queensland

- IUCN category VI (protected area with sustainable use of natural resources)
- Map showing the Gulf of Carpentaria Marine Park. The shaded area is a National Park Zone ('no take' zone).
- Location: Australia
- Coordinates: 15.8517°S 139.9243°E
- Area: 23,771 km^{2} (9,178 sq mi)
- Established: 1 July 2018
- Operator: Parks Australia
- Website: https://parksaustralia.gov.au/marine/parks/north

The Gulf of Carpentaria Marine Park (formerly known as the Gulf of Carpentaria Commonwealth Marine Reserve) is an Australian marine park in the Gulf of Carpentaria, offshore of Queensland and north of Mornington Island. The marine park covers an area of 23,771 km^{2} (9,178 sq mi) and is assigned IUCN category VI. It is one of 8 parks managed under the North Marine Parks Network.

== Conservation values ==
=== Species and habitat ===
- Important resting area for turtles between egg laying (internesting area), for the threatened: flatback turtle and green turtle.
- Important foraging habitat for breeding aggregations of the: migratory brown booby, migratory lesser frigatebird, migratory roseate tern, listed marine crested tern.

=== Bioregions and ecology ===
- Examples of the ecosystems of the Northern Shelf Province provincial bioregion (including the Carpentaria, Karumba-Nassau and Wellesley meso-scale bioregions).
- Gulf of Carpentaria coastal zone (high productivity; biodiversity and endemism; aggregations of marine life).
- Gulf of Carpentaria basin (biodiversity; aggregations of marine life).
- Plateau and saddle north-west of the Wellesley Islands (biodiversity and endemism; high aggregations of marine life).
- Submerged coral reefs of the Gulf of Carpentaria (biodiversity and endemism; high aggregations of marine life).

== History ==
The marine park was proclaimed under the EPBC Act on 14 December 2013 and renamed Gulf of Carpentaria Marine Park on 9 October 2017. The management plan and protection measures of the marine park came into effect for the first time on 1 July 2018.

== Summary of protection zones ==
The Gulf of Carpentaria Marine Park has been assigned IUCN protected area category VI. However, within the marine park there are two protection zones, each zone has an IUCN category and related rules for managing activities to ensure the protection of marine habitats and species.

The following table is a summary of the zoning rules within the Gulf of Carpentaria Marine Park:

Zone	IUCN	Activities permitted						Total area (km^{2})
Zone	IUCN	Vessel transiting	Recreational fishing	Commercial fishing	Commercial aquaculture	Commercial tourism	Mining	Total area (km^{2})
National Park	II	Yes	No	No	No	excludes fishing, with approval	No	3,623
Special Purpose (Trawl)	VI	Yes	Yes	excluding longline, with approval	with approval	with approval	with approval	20,148
External link: Zoning and rules for the North Marine Parks Network

== See also ==
- Protected areas managed by the Australian government
