= Murray Commonwealth Marine Reserve =

Australian marine protected area off the coast of South Australia

- IUCN category VI (protected area with sustainable use of natural resources)
- Map showing the Murray Commonwealth Marine Reserve
- Location: Indian Ocean, Australia
- Nearest town: Victor Harbor, South Australia
- Coordinates: 37.92°S 137.27°E
- Area: 25,803 km^{2} (9,963 sq mi)
- Established: August 31, 2007
- Governing body: Parks Australia (Commonwealth of Australia)
- Website: environment.gov.au/topics/marine/marine-reserves/south-east/murray

Murray Commonwealth Marine Reserve is a 25,803 km^{2} marine protected area within Australian waters located off the coast of South Australia. The reserve was established in 2007 and is part of the South-east Commonwealth Marine Reserve Network.

The reserve features the Murray Canyon which descends to 4,600 m (15,100 ft) below sea level and stretches for more than 150 km (93 mi). The southern right whale uses the inshore area of the reserve to nurse its young.

== Protection ==
Most of the Murray marine reserve area is IUCN protected area category VI, however there are multiple zoned areas within the reserve with different protection classifications.

Zone	IUCN	Activities permitted			Area (km^{2})
Zone	IUCN	Recreational fishing	Commercial fishing	Mining	Area (km^{2})
Marine National Park	II	No	No	No	12,749
Special Purpose	VI	Yes	No	with approval	7,147
Multiple Use	VI	Yes	with approval	with approval	5,907
(Note: Summary of permitted activities only, see source for details)

== See also ==
- Commonwealth marine reserves
- Protected areas of Australia
- Great Australian Bight
- Indian Ocean
