= Nelson Commonwealth Marine Reserve =

Australian marine protected area near the South Australia-Victoria border

- IUCN category VI (protected area with sustainable use of natural resources)
- Map showing the Nelson Commonwealth Marine Reserve
- Location: Indian Ocean, Australia
- Nearest town: Port Macdonnell, South Australia
- Coordinates: 39.31°S 139.85°E
- Area: 6,123 km^{2} (2,364 sq mi)
- Established: August 31, 2007
- Governing body: Parks Australia (Commonwealth of Australia)
- Website: environment.gov.au/topics/marine/marine-reserves/south-east/nelson

Nelson Commonwealth Marine Reserve is a 6,123 km^{2} marine protected area within Australian waters located in the Southern Ocean near the South Australia-Victoria border. The reserve was established in 2007 and is part of the South-east Commonwealth Marine Reserve Network.

The reserve spans deepwater ecosystems (below 3,000 m (9,800 ft)) and encloses geological features including plateaus, knolls, canyons and the abyssal plain. It is an important migration area for humpback, blue, fin and possibly sei whales.

== Protection ==
The entirety of the Nelson marine reserve area is IUCN protected area category VI and is zoned as 'Special Purpose'.

Zone	IUCN	Activities permitted			Area (km^{2})
Zone	IUCN	Recreational fishing	Commercial fishing	Mining	Area (km^{2})
Special Purpose	VI	Yes	No	with approval	6,123
(Note: Summary of permitted activities only, see source for details)

== See also ==
- Commonwealth marine reserves
- Protected areas of Australia
- Great Australian Bight
