= Cod Grounds Marine Park =

Australian marine park off Laurieton, New South Wales

- IUCN category II (national park)
- Map showing the Cod Grounds Marine Park. The area is a National Park Zone ('no take' zone).
- Location: Australia
- Coordinates: 31.6811°S 152.9103°E
- Area: 4 km^{2} (1.5 sq mi)
- Established: 10 May 2007
- Operator: Parks Australia
- Website: https://parksaustralia.gov.au/marine/parks/temperate-east

The Cod Grounds Marine Park (formerly known as the Cod Grounds Commonwealth Marine Reserve) is an Australian marine park located approximately 5.5 km offshore of New South Wales, near Laurieton. The marine park covers an area of 4 km^{2} (1.5 sq mi) and is assigned IUCN category II. It is one of 8 parks managed under the Temperate East Marine Parks Network.

== Conservation values ==
- Established 2007 to protect a significant aggregation site for the critically endangered east coast population of grey nurse sharks. The area is characterised by a series of underwater pinnacles.
- Biologically important areas for the protected humpback whale, vulnerable white shark and a number of migratory seabirds.
- Examples of the ecosystems of the Central Eastern Shelf Province provincial bioregion and the Manning Shelf meso-scale bioregion.

== History ==
The Marine Park was originally proclaimed on 10 May 2007 as the Cod Grounds Commonwealth Marine Reserve. The name of the reserve was later changed to Cod Grounds Marine Park on 9 October 2017.

== Summary of protection zones ==
The Cod Grounds Marine park has been assigned IUCN protected area category II and is wholly zoned as a National Park.

The following table is a summary of the zoning rules within the Cod Grounds Marine Park:

Zone	IUCN	Activities permitted						Total area (km^{2})
Zone	IUCN	Vessel transiting	Recreational fishing	Commercial fishing	Commercial aquaculture	Commercial tourism	Mining	Total area (km^{2})
National Park	II	Yes	No	No	No	excludes fishing, with approval	No	4
External link: Zoning and rules for the Temperate East Marine Parks Network

== See also ==
- Protected areas managed by the Australian government
