= West Cape York Marine Park =

Australian marine park offshore of Queensland

- IUCN category IV (habitat/species management area)
- Map showing the West Cape York Marine Park. The shaded area is a National Park Zone ('no take' zone).
- Location: Australia
- Coordinates: 10.9376°S 141.0441°E
- Area: 16,012 km^{2} (6,182 sq mi)
- Established: 1 July 2018
- Operator: Parks Australia
- Website: https://parksaustralia.gov.au/marine/parks/north

The West Cape York Marine Park (formerly known as the West Cape York Commonwealth Marine Reserve) is an Australian marine park offshore of Queensland and to the west of the Cape York Peninsula. The marine park covers an area of 16,012 km^{2} (6,182 sq mi) and is assigned IUCN category IV. It is one of 8 parks managed under the North Marine Parks Network.

== Conservation values ==
=== Species and habitat ===
- Important resting area for turtles between egg laying (internesting area), for the threatened species flatback turtle, hawksbill turtle and olive ridley turtle.
- Important roosting area for aggregations of the migratory lesser frigate bird.

=== Bioregions and ecology ===
- Examples of the ecosystems of two provincial bioregions: the Northern Shelf Province (which includes the Carpentaria and West Cape York mesoscale bioregions) and the Northeast Shelf Transition Province (which includes the Torres Strait meso-scale bioregion)
- Gulf of Carpentaria coastal zone (high productivity; biodiversity and endemism; aggregations of marine life)
- Gulf of Carpentaria basin (biodiversity; aggregations of marine life)

== History ==
The marine park was proclaimed under the EPBC Act on 14 December 2013 and renamed West Cape York Marine Park on 9 October 2017. The management plan and protection measures of the marine park came into effect for the first time on 1 July 2018.

== Summary of protection zones ==
The West Cape York Marine Park has been assigned IUCN protected area category IV. However, within the marine park there are three protection zones, each zone has an IUCN category and related rules for managing activities to ensure the protection of marine habitats and species.

The following table is a summary of the zoning rules within the West Cape York Marine Park:

Zone	IUCN	Activities permitted						Total area (km^{2})
Zone	IUCN	Vessel transiting	Recreational fishing	Commercial fishing	Commercial aquaculture	Commercial tourism	Mining	Total area (km^{2})
National Park	II	Yes	No	No	No	excludes fishing, with approval	No	3,329
Habitat Protection	IV	Yes	Yes	some, with approval	with approval	with approval	No	10,114
Special Purpose	VI	Yes	Yes	most, with approval	with approval	with approval	with approval	2,569
External link: Zoning and rules for the North Marine Parks Network

== See also ==
- Protected areas managed by the Australian government
