= Oceanic Shoals Marine Park =

Australian marine park offshore of the Northern Territory, near Darwin

- IUCN category VI (protected area with sustainable use of natural resources)
- Map showing the Oceanic Shoals Marine Park. The shaded area is a National Park Zone ('no take' zone).
- Location: Australia
- Coordinates: 11.2228°S 128.6417°E
- Area: 71,743 km^{2} (27,700 sq mi)
- Established: 1 July 2018
- Operator: Parks Australia
- Website: https://parksaustralia.gov.au/marine/parks/north

The Oceanic Shoals Marine Park (formerly known as the Oceanic Shoals Commonwealth Marine Reserve) is an Australian marine park offshore of the Northern Territory, near of Darwin. The marine park covers an area of 71,743 km^{2} (27,700 sq mi) and is assigned IUCN category VI. It is the largest of the 8 parks managed under the North Marine Parks Network.

== Conservation values ==
=== Species and habitat ===
- Important resting area for turtles between egg laying (internesting area), for the threatened flatback turtle and olive ridley turtle.
- Important foraging area for the threatened loggerhead turtle and olive ridley turtle.

=== Bioregions and ecology ===
- Examples of the ecosystems of two provincial bioregions: the Northwest Shelf Transition Province (which includes the Bonaparte, Oceanic Shoals, and Tiwi meso-scale bioregions) and the Timor Transition Province.
- Carbonate bank and terrace system of the Van Diemen Rise (unique sea-floor feature).
- Carbonate banks of the Joseph Bonaparte Gulf (enhanced productivity, high biodiversity, unique sea-floor feature).
- Pinnacles of the Bonaparte Basin (enhanced productivity, unique sea-floor feature).
- Shelf break and slope of the Arafura Shelf (unique sea-floor feature).
Animals observed in the park

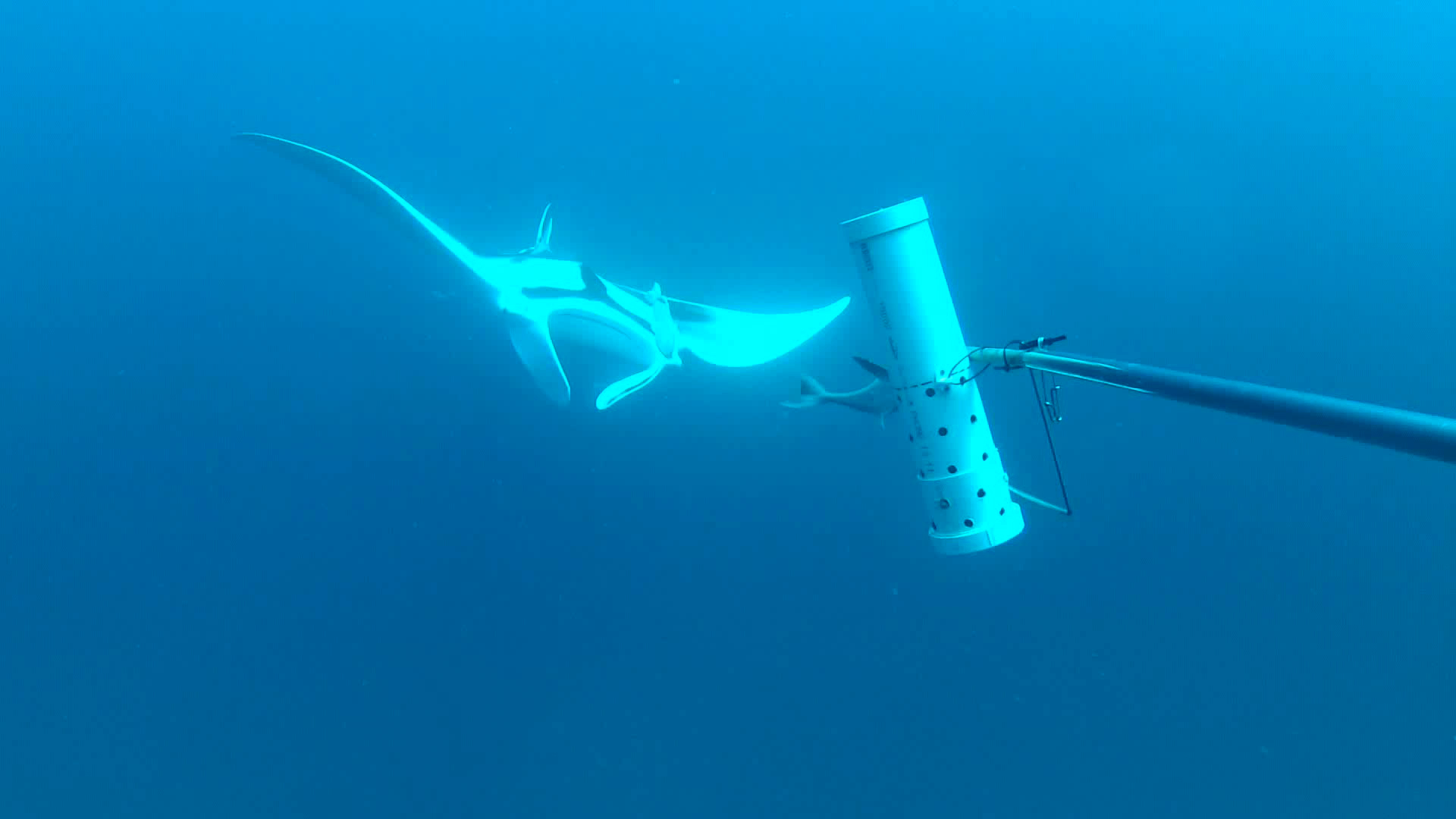
Manta birostris

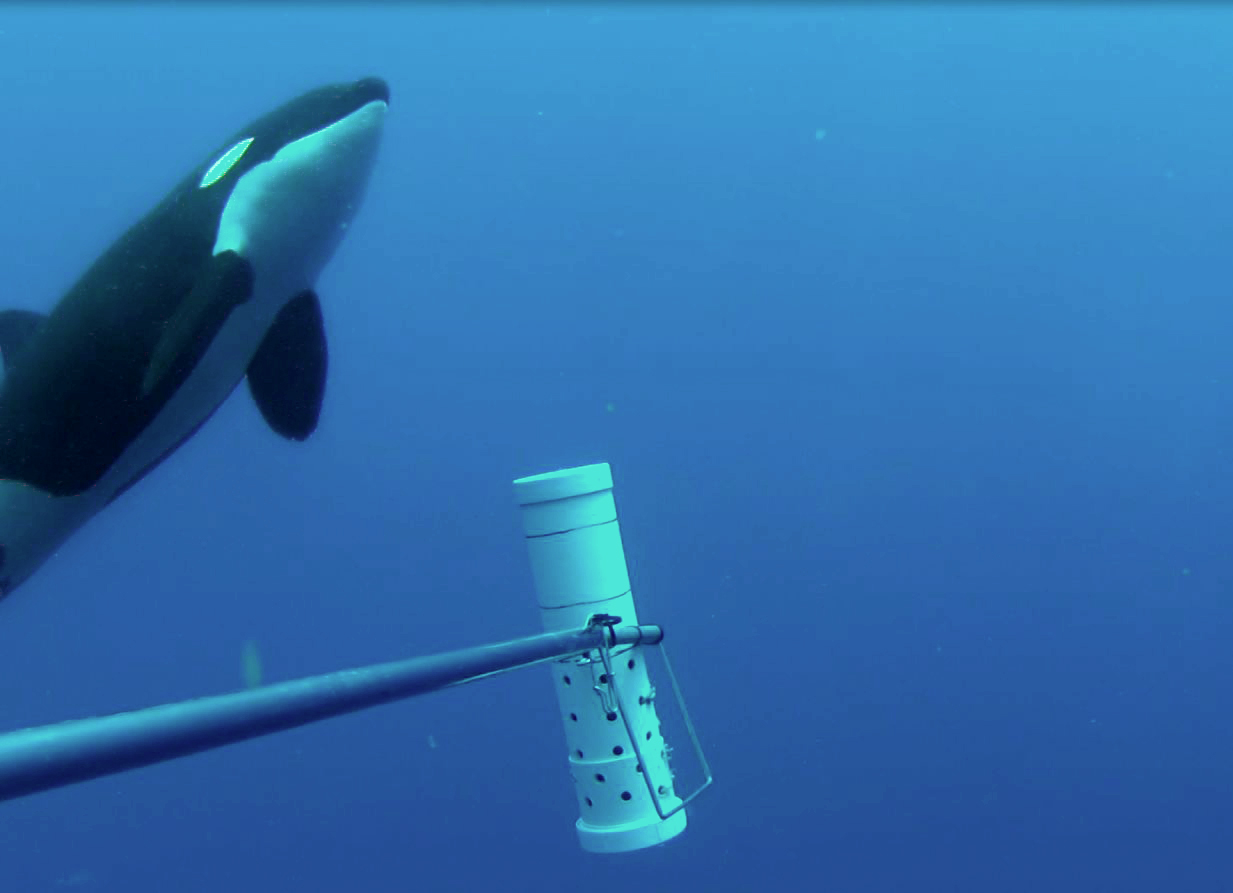
Killer whale (Orcinus orca)

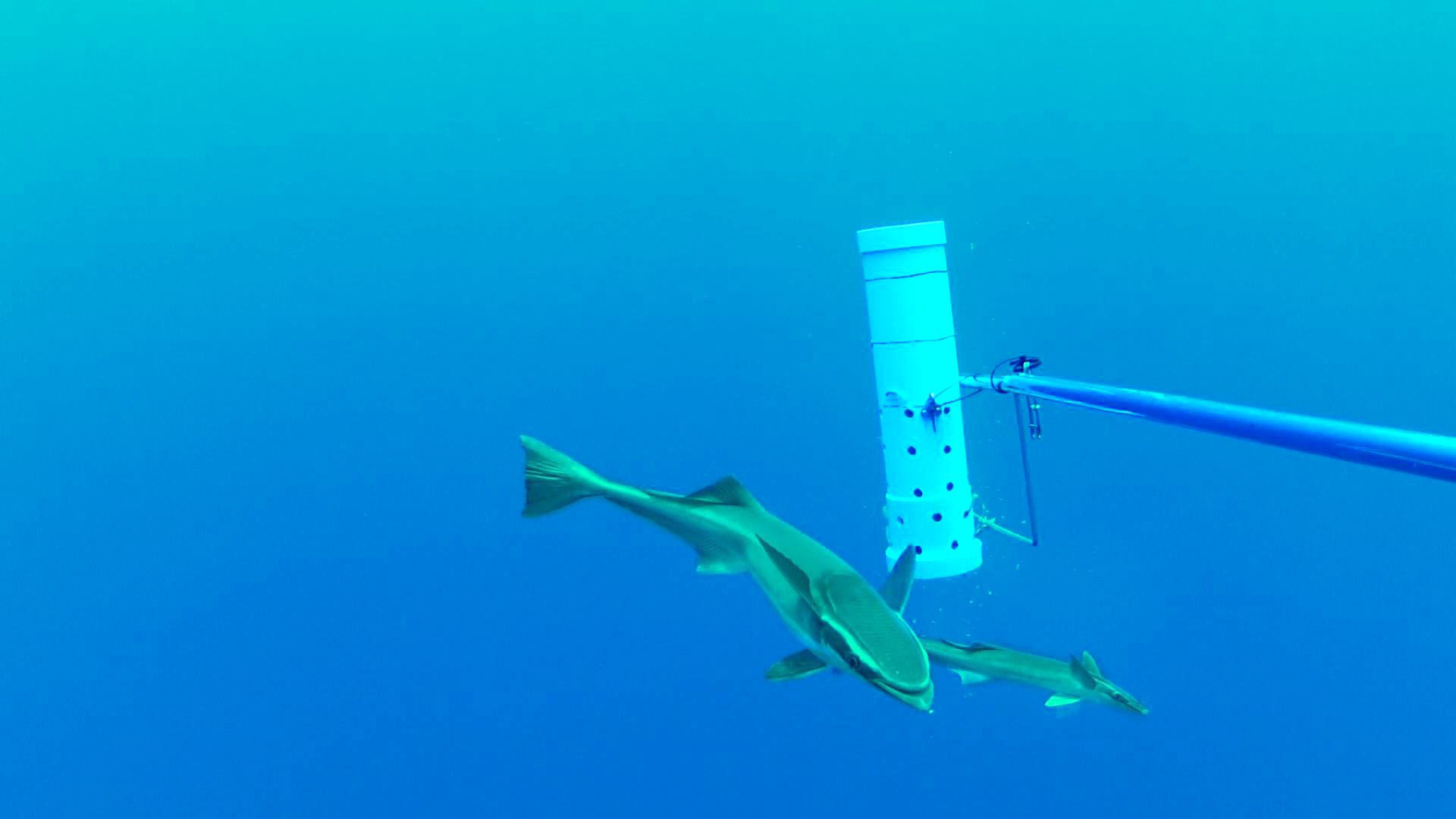
Echeneis naucrates

== History ==
The marine park was proclaimed under the EPBC Act on 14 December 2013 and renamed Oceanic Shoals Marine Park on 9 October 2017. The management plan and protection measures of the marine park came into effect for the first time on 1 July 2018.

== Summary of protection zones ==
The Oceanic Shoals Marine Park has been assigned IUCN protected area category VI. However, within the marine park there are four protection zones, each zone has an IUCN category and related rules for managing activities to ensure the protection of marine habitats and species.

The following table is a summary of the zoning rules within the Oceanic Shoals Marine Park:

Zone	IUCN	Activities permitted						Total area (km^{2})
Zone	IUCN	Vessel transiting	Recreational fishing	Commercial fishing	Commercial aquaculture	Commercial tourism	Mining	Total area (km^{2})
National Park	II	Yes	No	No	No	excludes fishing, with approval	No	406
Habitat Protection	IV	Yes	Yes	some, with approval	with approval	with approval	No	6,929
Multiple Use	VI	Yes	Yes	most, with approval	with approval	with approval	with approval	39,964
Special Purpose (Trawl)	VI	Yes	Yes	excluding longline, with approval	with approval	with approval	with approval	24,444
External link: Zoning and rules for the North Marine Parks Network

== See also ==
- Protected areas managed by the Australian government
