= Dampier Marine Park =

Australian marine park north-east of Karratha, Western Australia

- IUCN category VI (protected area with sustainable use of natural resources)
- Map showing the Dampier Marine Park. The shaded area is a National Park Zone ('no take' zone).
- Location: Australia
- Coordinates: 20.4334°S 117.1750°E
- Area: 1,252 km^{2} (483 sq mi)
- Established: 1 July 2018
- Operator: Parks Australia
- Website: https://parksaustralia.gov.au/marine/parks/north-west

The Dampier Marine Park (formerly known as the Dampier Commonwealth Marine Reserve) is an Australian marine park offshore of Western Australia, north-east of Karratha. The marine park covers an area of 1,252 km^{2} (483 sq mi) and is assigned IUCN category VI. It is one of the 13 parks managed under the North-west Marine Parks Network.

== Conservation values ==
=== Species and habitat ===
- Foraging areas adjacent to important breeding areas for migratory seabirds.
- Foraging areas adjacent to important nesting sites for marine turtles.
- Includes part of the migratory pathway of the protected humpback whale.
- The reserve provides a high level of protection for offshore shelf habitats adjacent to the Dampier Archipelago.

=== Bioregions and ecology ===
- The reserve provides high level protection for the shallow shelf with depths ranging from 15 metres to 70 metres.
- Examples of the communities and seafloor habitats of the Northwest Shelf Province provincial bioregion as well as the Pilbara (nearshore) and Pilbara (offshore) meso-scale bioregions.

== History ==
The marine park was proclaimed under the EPBC Act on 14 December 2013 and renamed Dampier Marine Park on 9 October 2017. The management plan and protection measures of the marine park came into effect for the first time on 1 July 2018.

== Summary of protection zones ==
The Dampier Marine Park has been assigned IUCN protected area category VI. However, within the marine park there are three protection zones, each zone has an IUCN category and related rules for managing activities to ensure the protection of marine habitats and species.

The following table is a summary of the zoning rules within the Dampier Marine Park:

Zone	IUCN	Activities permitted						Total area (km^{2})
Zone	IUCN	Vessel transiting	Recreational fishing	Commercial fishing	Commercial aquaculture	Commercial tourism	Mining	Total area (km^{2})
National Park	II	Yes	No	No	No	excludes fishing, with approval	No	36,050
Habitat Protection	IV	Yes	Yes	most, with approval	with approval	with approval	No	6,929
Multiple Use	VI	Yes	Yes	most, with approval	with approval	with approval	with approval	108,812
External link: Zoning and rules for the North-west Marine Parks Network

== See also ==
- Protected areas managed by the Australian government
