= Apollo Marine Park =

Marine park in Australia in Bass Strait off the coast of Victoria

- IUCN category VI (protected area with sustainable use of natural resources)
- Map showing the Apollo Marine Park
- Location: Bass Strait, Australia
- Nearest town: Apollo Bay, Victoria
- Coordinates: 39.20°S 143.66°E
- Area: 1,184 km^{2} (457 sq mi)
- Established: 31 August 2007
- Governing body: Parks Australia
- Website: parksaustralia.gov.au/marine/parks/south-east/

The Apollo Marine Park (previously known as the Apollo Commonwealth Marine Reserve) is an Australian Marine Park located in Bass Strait off the coast of Victoria and near Tasmania's King Island. The marine park was established in 2007 and covers an area of 1,184 km^{2} (457 sq mi). It is managed as part of the South-east Marine Parks Network.

One of the reserve's features includes the Otway Depression, a 100 m deep undersea valley joining the Bass Basin to the open ocean. This valley was an outlet channel for the ancient Bass Lake and mainland river systems, which existed during the last ice age.

== Protection ==
The Apollo Marine Park has been assigned IUCN protected area category VI and is wholly zoned as "Multiple Use".

The following table is a summary of the "Multiple Use Zone" of the marine park:

Zone	IUCN	Activities permitted			Area (km^{2})
Zone	IUCN	Recreational fishing	Commercial fishing	Mining	Area (km^{2})
Multiple Use	VI	Yes	with approval	with approval	1,184
(Note: Summary of permitted activities only, see source for details)

== Shipwrecks ==
The MS City of Rayville is located within the marine reserve near Cape Otway. It was the first American vessel sunk during World War II.

== See also ==
- Protected areas of Australia
