= Australian marine parks =

Marine protected areas managed by the Australian government

Map showing Australian marine parks, colour-coded by network group. Darker areas highlight Sanctuary or National Park zones ("no take" zones).

Australian marine parks (formerly Commonwealth marine reserves) are marine protected areas located within Australian waters and are managed by the Australian government. These waters generally extend from three nautical miles off the coast to the outer limit of Australia’s exclusive economic zone at 200 nautical miles while marine protected areas located closer in-shore are the responsibility of the states or the Northern Territory.

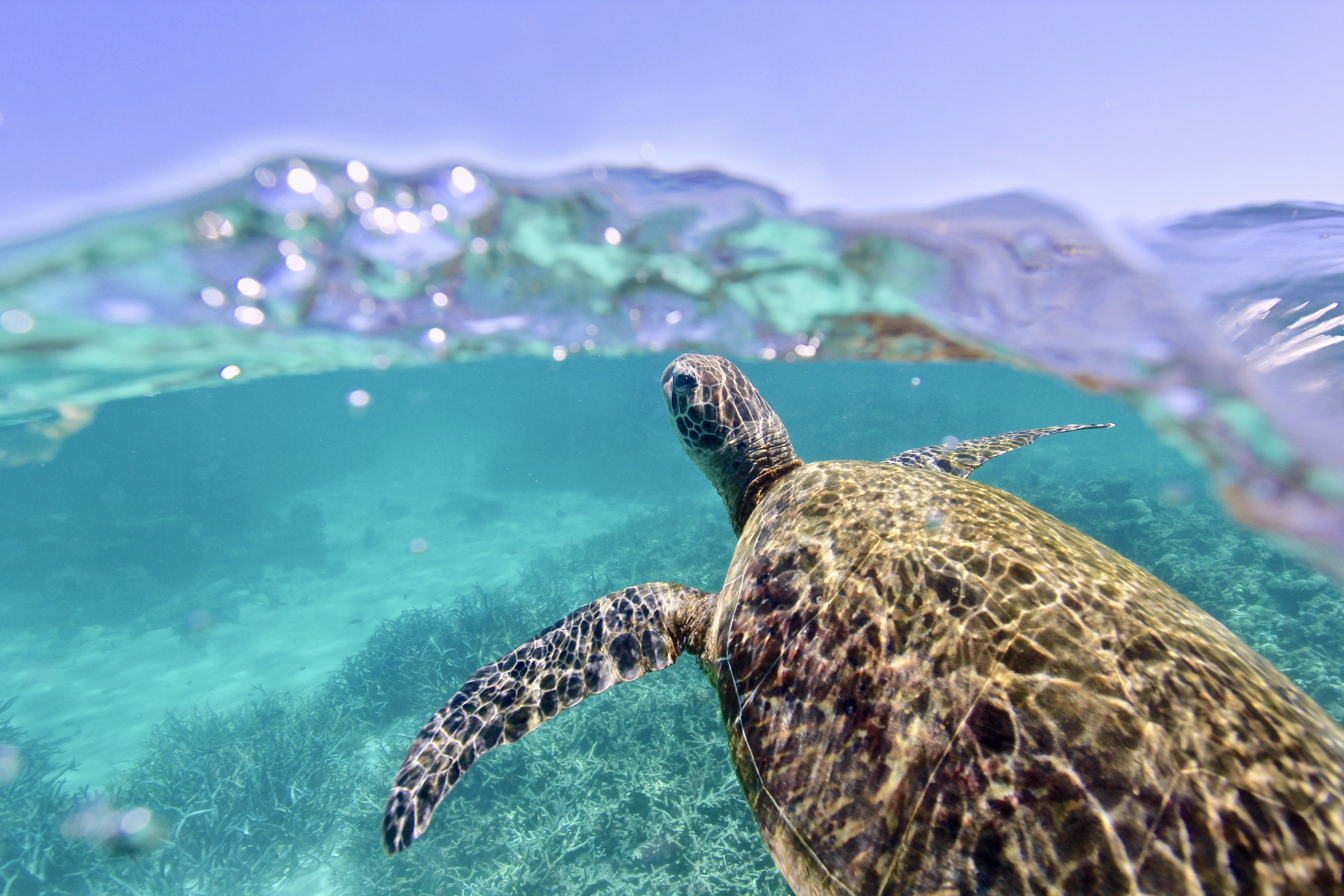
Green sea turtle coming up for air at the Ningaloo Reef off Western Australia within an Australian marine park

== History ==
Under the Howard government the world’s first Oceans Policy was developed. It included the creation of the Great Australian Bight Marine Park in 1998, greatly increased protection of the Great Barrier Reef Marine Park, and in 2007, established a series of large marine parks in Australia's south-east, now collectively known as the South-east Marine Parks Network.

=== 2012 marine parks ===
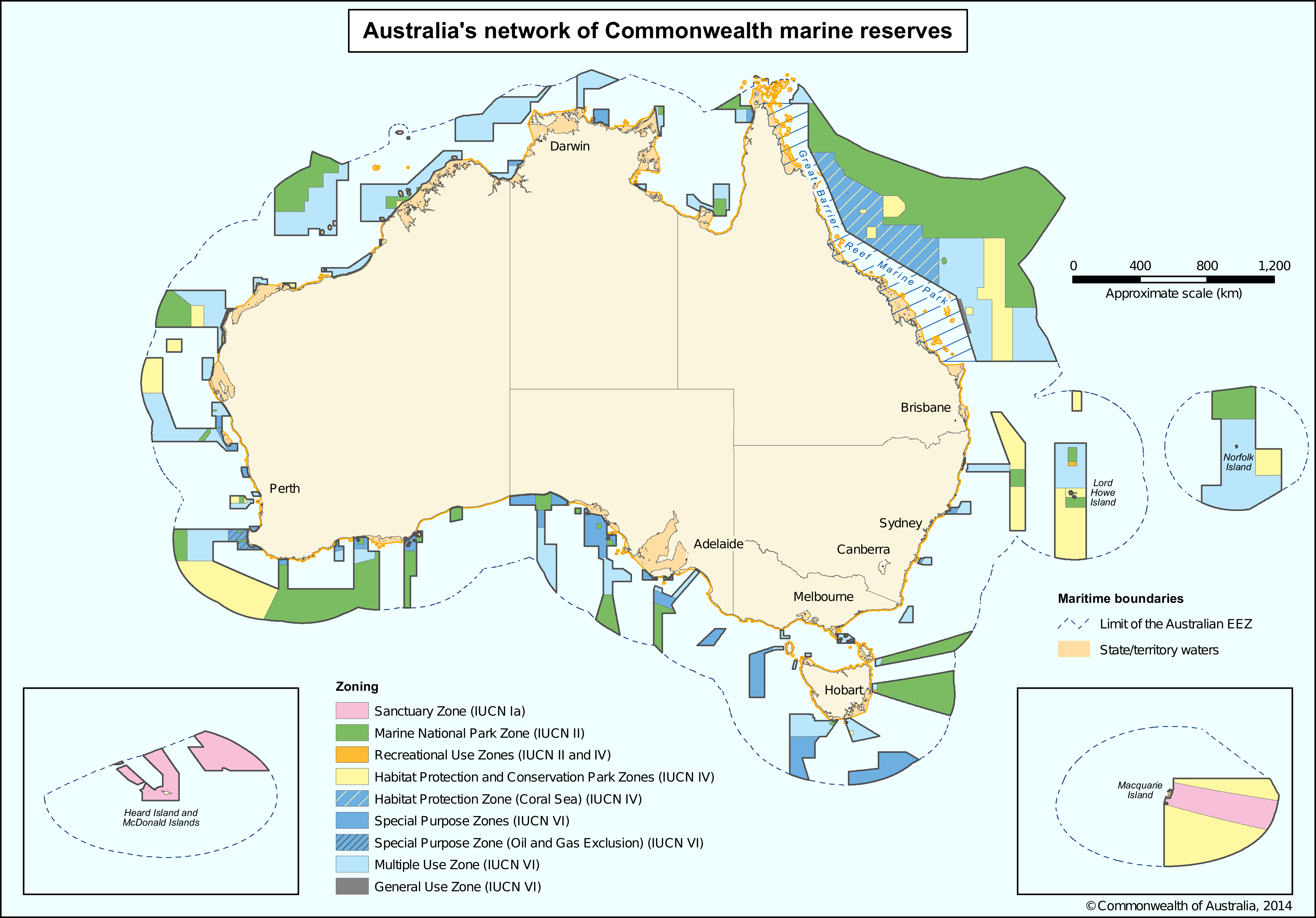
Map of the Commonwealth marine reserves announced in 2012, showing the original scheduled zoning rules

In 2012, the Australian government under Labor/Julia Gillard revealed plans to create the world's largest marine reserve network, made up of five main zones in offshore waters surrounding every state and territory. The number of marine reserves off the Australian coast would increase from 27 to 60 and would cover 3,100,000 km^{2} (1,200,000 sq mi) of ocean including the entire Coral Sea.

The plans were met with criticism by commercial and recreational fishers, for being too restrictive, and by environment groups for skirting areas of potential oil and gas prospectively, and that just a small amount of the total area completely off-limits fishing.

==== Suspension and review ====
In the lead-up to the 2013 Australian federal election, the Liberal–National Coalition opposition led by Tony Abbott pledged to stop the expansion of marine protection parks announced during Labor's tenure. Following the election of the Abbott government in September, the reserves announced in 2012 were re-proclaimed new Commonwealth marine reserves, invalidating the management plans and exclusion zones before they came into effect the following year on 1 July 2014. As such, the suspension left the reserves as "paper parks" with no effective protection measures.

A review into the 40 Commonwealth Marine Reserves that were announced in 2012 began in September 2014. This included the reserves of the South-west, North-west, North, Temperate East and Coral Sea marine regions.

The results of the review were released in September 2016, which recommended zoning changes to 26 of 40 reserves and reductions to the area available to mining, while reducing the impact on commercial fisheries. A later release of draft management plans showed further reductions in no-take zones, including six of the largest marine parks that had the area of their Marine National Park Zones (IUCN II) reduced by between 42% and 73%.

The new management plans for the 40 marine parks came into effect on 1 July 2018, bringing all marine parks under protection.

=== Renaming ===
During a period of 2017, feedback was sought for the draft management plans of the 2012 Commonwealth Marine Reserves Review. The consultation process included a proposal to rename Commonwealth marine reserves. On 11 October 2017, the 58 Commonwealth Marine Reserves managed by Parks Australia were renamed as "Marine Parks".

== Protection zones ==
Individual marine parks are assigned an IUCN category. However, each marine park may have one or multiple protection zones, each zone has an IUCN protected area category and related rules for managing activities to ensure the protection of marine habitats and species

The following table is a summary of the zoning rules of Australian marine parks:

Zone	IUCN	Activities permitted					
Zone	IUCN	Vessel transiting	Recreational fishing	Commercial fishing	Commercial aquaculture	Commercial tourism	Mining
Sanctuary zone	Ia	No	No	No	No	aviation only, with approval	No
National park	II	Yes	No	No	No	excludes fishing, with approval	No
Recreational use	II	Yes	Yes	No	No	excludes fishing, with approval	No
Habitat protection	IV	Yes	Yes	most, with approval	with approval	with approval	No
Multiple use	VI	Yes	Yes	most, with approval	with approval	with approval	with approval
Special purpose	VI	Yes	Yes	most, with approval	with approval	with approval	with approval
Note: A summary of zones and permitted activities only.

== List of marine parks ==
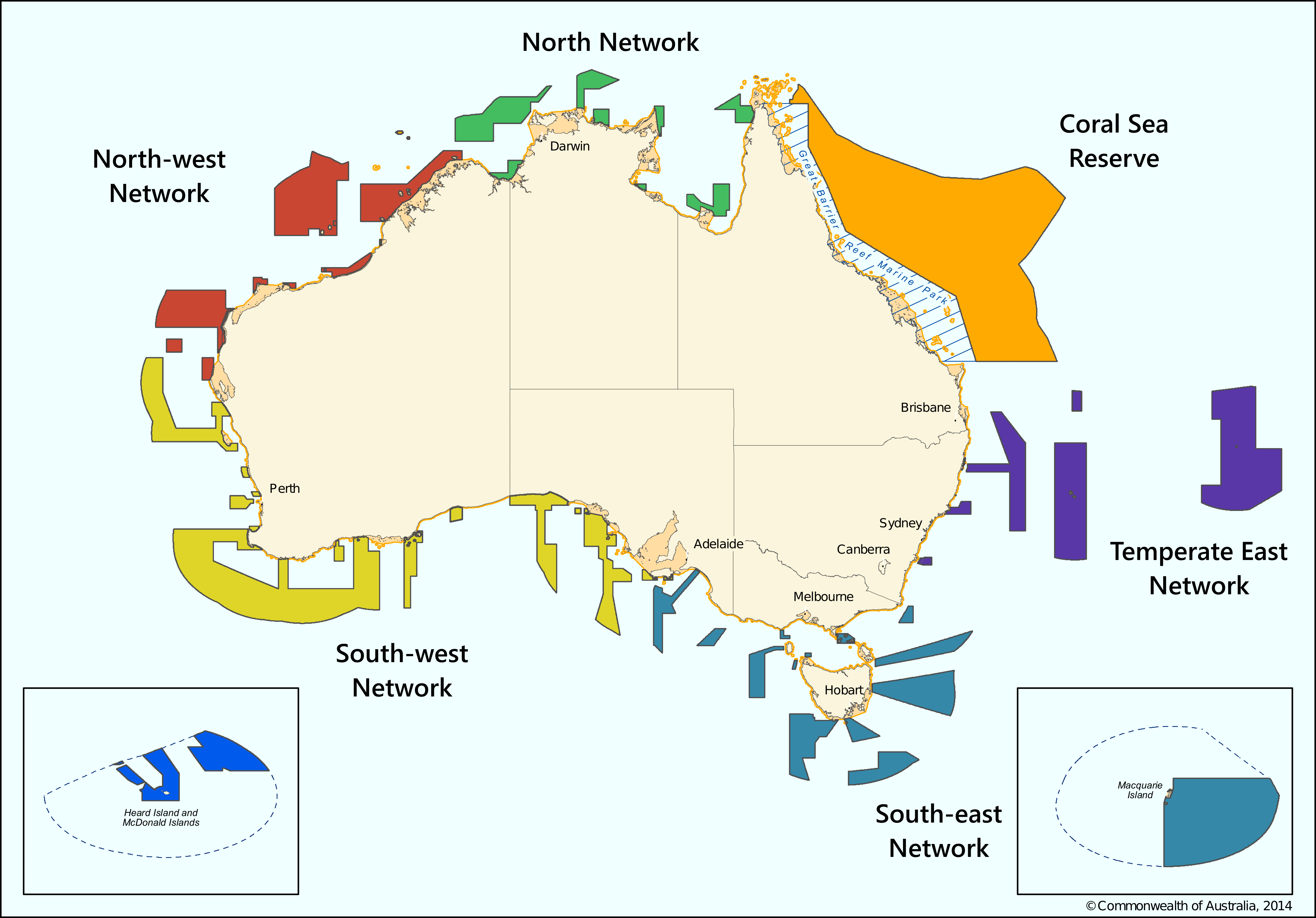
Australian marine parks networks

The Australian marine parks are managed in groups of reserves called "networks", except for the Coral Sea Marine Park and the Heard Island and McDonald Islands Marine Reserve.

New parks are in the process of being created around Christmas Island and the Cocos (Keeling) Islands.

=== Coral Sea Marine Park ===
The Coral Sea Marine Park covers 989,836 km^{2} (382,178 sq mi), it is the largest of Australia's marine parks and is located off the coast of Queensland in the Coral Sea.

=== Heard Island and McDonald Islands Marine Reserve ===
The Heard Island and McDonald Islands are located in the southern Indian Ocean, approximately 4,100 kilometres south-west of Perth, Western Australia. The marine reserve covers an area of approximately 71,200 km^{2} (27,500 sq mi).

=== North Network ===
The North Marine Parks Network contains 8 marine parks covering 157,480 km^{2} (60,800 sq mi), located off the coast of the Northern Territory and Queensland.

- Arafura
- Arnhem
- Gulf of Carpentaria
- Joseph Bonaparte Gulf
- Limmen
- Oceanic Shoals
- West Cape York
- Wessel

=== North-west Network ===
The North-west Marine Parks Network contains 13 marine parks covering 335,341 km^{2} (129,476 sq mi), located off the north-west coast of Western Australia.

- Argo-Rowley Terrace
- Ashmore Reef
- Carnarvon
- Cartier Island
- Dampier
- Eighty Mile Beach
- Gascoyne
- Kimberley
- Mermaid Reef
- Montebello Islands Marine Park
- Ningaloo
- Roebuck Bay
- Shark Bay

=== Temperate East Network ===
The Temperate East Marine Parks Network contains 8 marine parks covering 383,339 km^{2} (148,008 sq mi), located off the coast of New South Wales.

- Central Eastern
- Cod Grounds
- Gifford
- Hunter
- Jervis
- Lord Howe
- Norfolk
- Solitary Islands

=== South-east Network ===
The South-east Marine Parks Network contains 14 marine parks covering 388,464 km^{2} (149,987 sq mi), located off the coasts of Victoria, Tasmania and South Australia.

- Apollo
- Beagle
- Boags
- East Gippsland
- Flinders
- Franklin
- Freycinet
- Huon
- Macquarie Island
- Murray
- Nelson
- South Tasman Rise
- Tasman Fracture
- Zeehan

=== South-west Network ===
The South-west Network contains 14 marine parks covering 508,371 km^{2} (196,283 sq mi), located off the coast of South Australia and Western Australia.

- Abrolhos
- Bremer
- Eastern Recherche Marine Park
- Geographe
- Great Australian Bight
- Jurien
- Murat
- Perth Canyon
- South-west Corner
- Southern Kangaroo Island
- Twilight
- Two Rocks
- Western Eyre
- Western Kangaroo Island

== See also ==
- Protected areas managed by the Australian government
