= Eastern Recherche Marine Park =

Marine protected area off Western Australia

- IUCN category II (national park)
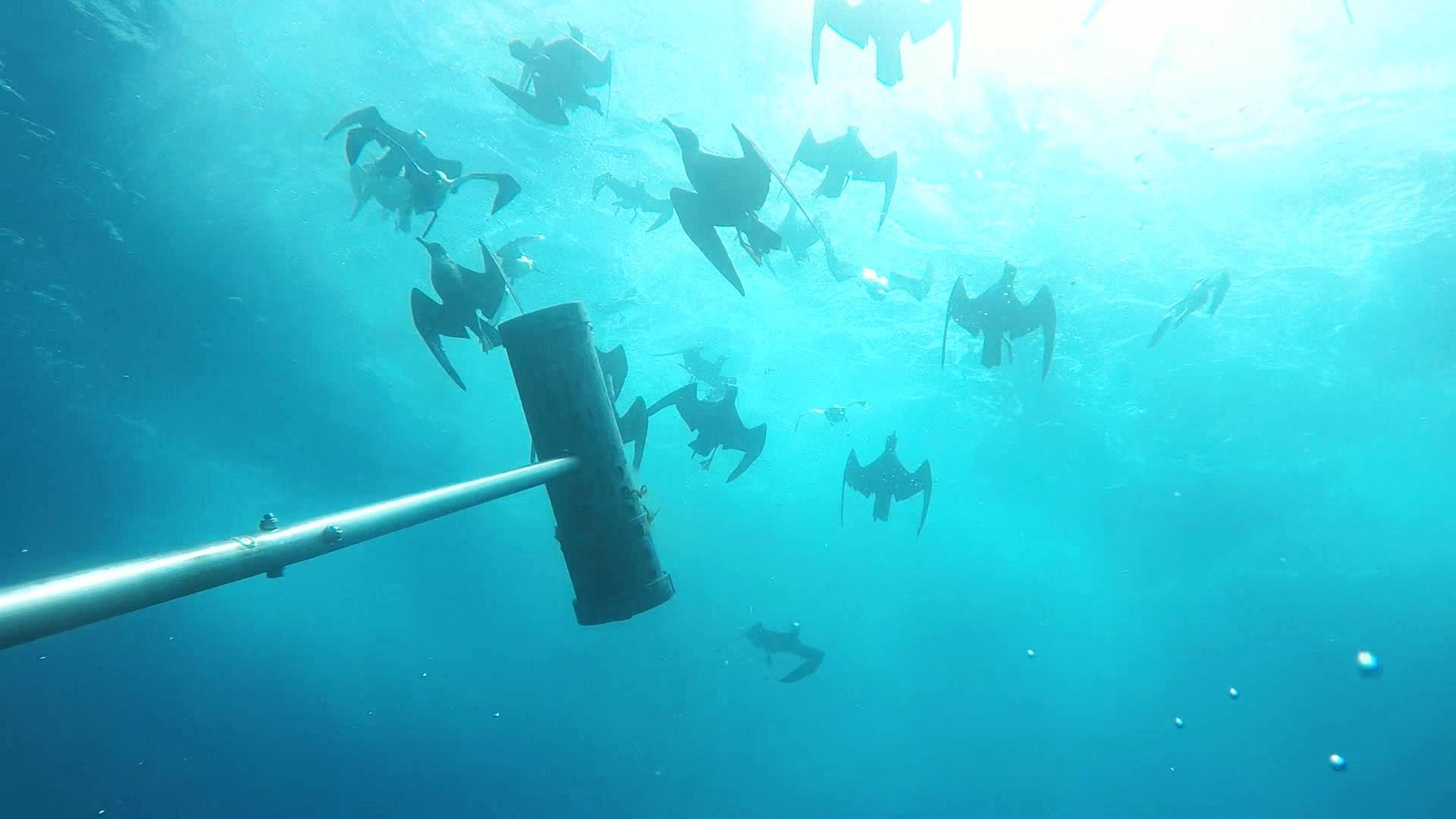
- Flesh-footed shearwaters underwater in Eastern Recherche Marine Park

- Location within Western Australia Location within Australia
- Location: Western Australia
- Coordinates: 33°36′S 124°18′E
- Area: 20,575 km^{2} (7,944 sq mi)
- Established: 14 December 2013
- Governing body: Director of National Parks
- Website: parksaustralia.gov.au/marine/parks/south-west/eastern-recherche

Eastern Recherche Marine Park is a marine park adjacent to the Recherche Archipelago, close to the Western Australian Cape Arid National Park, and 135 km east of Esperance, on the south coast of Western Australia. It has consists of two sections: one of 5,010 km^{2} (1,930 sq mi) which is managed as an IUCN protected area category VI ( sustainable use of natural resources), and a further section of 15,565 km^{2} (6,010 sq mi) which is managed as an IUCN protected area category II (national park). The maximum depth of the park is 6,000 metres (20,000 ft).

It was proclaimed under the EPBC Act in 2013 and given its present name in 2017.

The park contains habitats adjacent to the Recherche Archipelago, which contains over 150 islands stretching over 200 km^{2} of ocean, and is an area of high biodiversity. It also contains an extensive area of rocky reef environments, in addition to seagrass habitats. Both the reef and seagrass habitats support many warm temperate species.

The park contains two known shipwrecks listed under the Historic Shipwrecks Act 1997: Rodondo (1894) and the Start (1879).
