= Ningaloo Marine Park =

Ningaloo Marine Park may mean:

- Ningaloo Marine Park (Commonwealth waters), the marine park in Commonwealth waters managed by Parks Australia of the Australian Government.
- Ningaloo Marine Park (state waters), the marine park in state waters managed by the Department of Parks & Wildlife of Western Australia.
