= Flinders Commonwealth Marine Reserve =

Australian marine protected area off north-east Tasmania

- IUCN category II (national park)
- Map showing the Flinders Commonwealth Marine Reserve
- Location: Tasman Sea, Australia
- Nearest town: Ansons Bay, Tasmania
- Coordinates: 40.00°S 151.56°E
- Area: 27,043 km^{2} (10,441 sq mi)
- Established: August 31, 2007
- Governing body: Parks Australia (Commonwealth of Australia)
- Website: environment.gov.au/topics/marine/marine-reserves/south-east/flinders

Flinders Commonwealth Marine Reserve is a 27,043km^{2} marine protected area within Australian waters located off the coast of north-east Tasmania. It extends to the outer limits of the Australian exclusive economic zone in the Tasman Sea. The reserve was established in 2007 and is part of the South-east Commonwealth Marine Reserve Network.

The reserve area contains habitat for lace corals, sea sponges and giant crabs. A prominent feature is a large offshore seamount believed to be too deep to have been fished. Seamounts generally host a wide variety of habitats that support deep ocean biodiversity, the large seamounts to the east of Tasmania are individually important, as they are expected to include endemic species.

== Protection ==
Most of the Flinders marine reserve area is IUCN protected area category II and zoned as 'Marine National Park'. A small portion near the coast is zoned as 'Multiple Use' (IUCN VI).

Zone	IUCN	Activities permitted			Area (km^{2})
Zone	IUCN	Recreational fishing	Commercial fishing	Mining	Area (km^{2})
Marine National Park	II	No	No	No	25,812
Multiple Use	VI	Yes	with approval	with approval	1,231
(Note: Summary of permitted activities only, see source for details)

== See also ==
- Commonwealth marine reserves
- Protected areas of Australia
- Flinders Island
- Pacific Ocean
