= Zeehan Commonwealth Marine Reserve =

Australian marine protected area west of Tasmania

- IUCN category VI (protected area with sustainable use of natural resources)
- Map showing the Zeehan Commonwealth Marine Reserve
- Location: Indian Ocean, Australia
- Nearest town: Currie, Tasmania
- Coordinates: 41.18°S 142.34°E
- Area: 19,897 km^{2} (7,682 sq mi)
- Established: August 31, 2007
- Governing body: Parks Australia (Commonwealth of Australia)
- Website: environment.gov.au/topics/marine/marine-reserves/south-east/zeehan

Zeehan Commonwealth Marine Reserve is a 19,897 km^{2} marine protected area within Australian waters located west of Tasmania and extending to near King Island. The reserve was established in 2007 and is part of the South-east Commonwealth Marine Reserve Network.

The reserve includes a variety of seabed habitats, including exposed limestone, that provides important habitat for a variety of commercial fish species as well as giant crab. There is a broad depth range, from the shallow continental shelf of about 50 m (160 ft) to the abyssal plain with depths of over 3,000 m (9,800 ft).

== Protection ==
The entire Murray marine reserve area is IUCN protected area category VI and has two zones; 'Special Purpose' and 'Multiple Use'.

Zone	IUCN	Activities permitted			Area (km^{2})
Zone	IUCN	Recreational fishing	Commercial fishing	Mining	Area (km^{2})
Special Purpose	VI	Yes	No	with approval	18,967
Multiple Use	VI	Yes	with approval	with approval	933
(Note: Summary of permitted activities only, see source for details)

== See also ==
- Commonwealth marine reserves
- Protected areas of Australia
- Zeehan, Tasmania
