= East Gippsland Commonwealth Marine Reserve =

Australian marine protexted area near the New South Wales-Victoria border

- IUCN category VI (protected area with sustainable use of natural resources)
- Map showing the East Gippsland Commonwealth Marine Reserve
- Location: Tasman Sea, Australia
- Nearest town: Mallacoota, Victoria
- Coordinates: 38.12°S 150.33°E
- Area: 4,137 km^{2} (1,597 sq mi)
- Established: August 31, 2007
- Governing body: Parks Australia (Commonwealth of Australia)
- Website: environment.gov.au/topics/marine/marine-reserves/south-east/east-gippsland

East Gippsland Commonwealth Marine Reserve is a 4,137 km^{2} marine protected area within Australian waters located in the Tasman Sea near the New South Wales-Victoria border. The reserve was established in 2007 and is part of the South-east Commonwealth Marine Reserve Network.

The reserve includes both warm and temperate waters, with the East Australian Current bringing subtropical water from the north, forming large eddies around Cape Howe. The complex mix of warmer and cooler waters and the seasonality of currents creates conditions for highly productive phytoplankton growth, which supports an abundance of marine life.

== Protection ==
The entirety of the East Gippsland marine reserve area is IUCN protected area category VI and zoned as 'Multiple Use'.

Zone	IUCN	Activities permitted			Area (km^{2})
Zone	IUCN	Recreational fishing	Commercial fishing	Mining	Area (km^{2})
Multiple Use	VI	Yes	with approval	with approval	4,137
(Note: Summary of permitted activities only, see source for details)

== See also ==
- Commonwealth marine reserves
- Protected areas of Australia
- Pacific Ocean
