= Ningaloo Marine Park (Commonwealth waters) =

Australian marine park west of the Ningaloo Coast of Western Australia

- IUCN category IV (habitat/species management area)
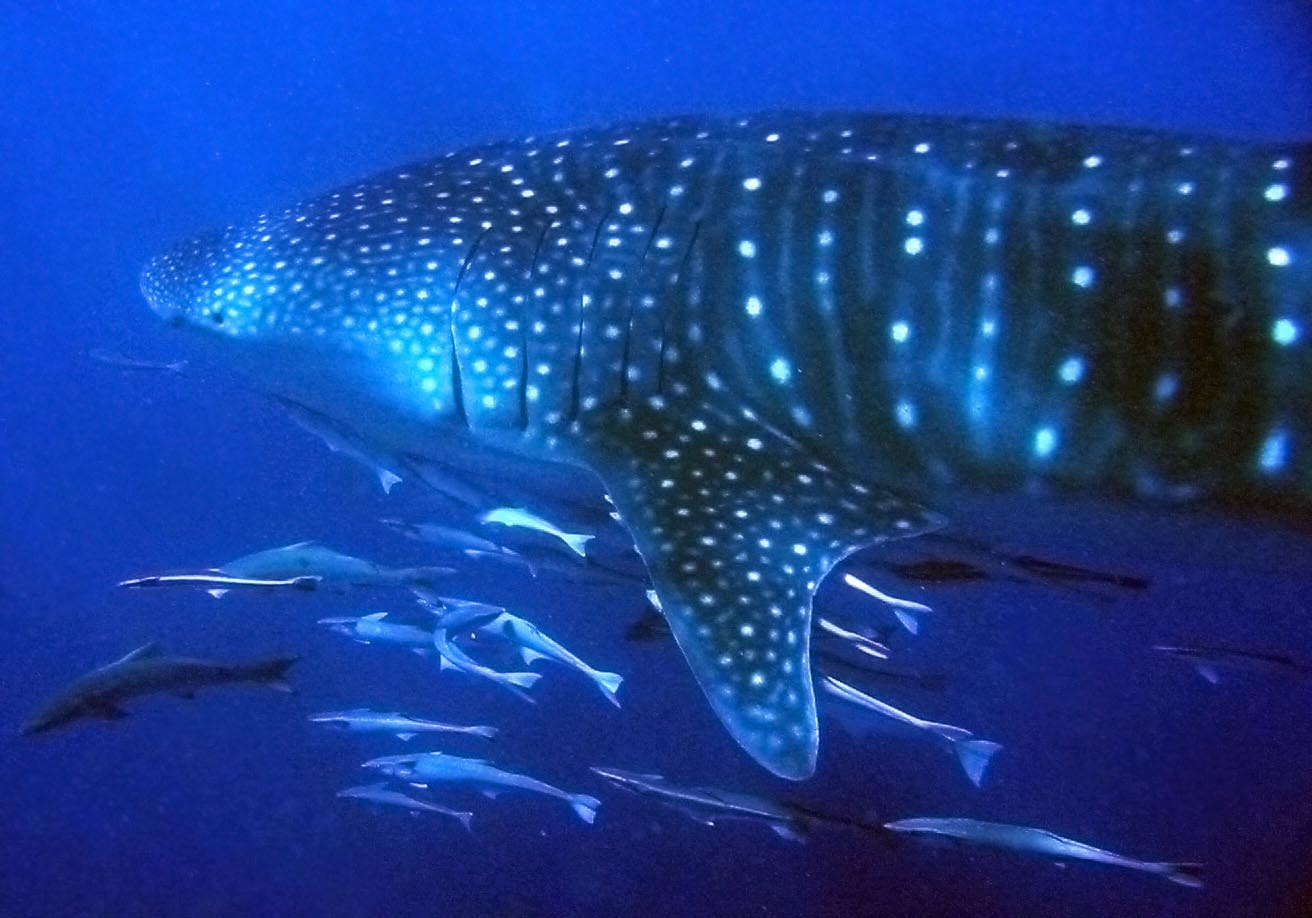
- Male whale shark, about 6 metres (20 ft) long
- Map showing the Ningaloo Marine Park. The shaded area is a National Park Zone ('no take' zone).
- Location: Australia
- Coordinates: 22.6191°S 113.5461°E
- Area: 2,435 km^{2} (940 sq mi)
- Established: 20 May 1987
- Operator: Parks Australia
- Website: parksaustralia.gov.au/marine/parks/north-west/ningaloo/

The Ningaloo Marine Park (formerly known as the Ningaloo Commonwealth Marine Reserve) is an Australian marine park offshore of Western Australia, and west of the Ningaloo Coast.

The marine park covers an area of 2,435 km^{2} (940 sq mi) and is assigned IUCN category IV. It is one of the 13 parks managed under the North-west Marine Parks Network.

A marine park of the same name lies directly east, but is managed by the Department of Parks & Wildlife of Western Australia.

== Conservation values ==
=== Species and habitat ===
- Has a high abundance of Manta Rays within lagoons and outer reef areas.
- Foraging areas for vulnerable and migratory whale sharks.
- Foraging areas and adjacent to important nesting sites for marine turtles.
- Includes part of the migratory pathway of the protected humpback whale.

=== Bioregions and ecology ===
The reserve includes shallow shelf environments and provides protection for shelf and slope habitats, as well as pinnacle and terrace seafloor features. Examples of the seafloor habitats and communities of the Central Western Shelf Transition provincial bioregion.

=== Conservation Issues ===
Climate change is of high concern within this marine park due to effects such as ocean acidification, flooding, storms, and increased wave energy.

== History ==
The marine park was originally proclaimed under the National Parks and Wildlife Conservation Act 1975 on 20 May 1987 as the Ningaloo Marine Park (Commonwealth Waters). The marine park was proclaimed under the EPBC Act on 14 December 2013 as a Commonwealth Marine Reserve and renamed Ningaloo Marine Park on 9 October 2017.

== Summary of protection zones ==
The Ningaloo Marine Park has been assigned IUCN protected area category IV. However, within the marine park there are two protection zones, each zone has an IUCN category and related rules for managing activities to ensure the protection of marine habitats and species.

The following table is a summary of the zoning rules within the Ningaloo Marine Park:

Zone	IUCN	Activities permitted						Total area (km^{2})
Zone	IUCN	Vessel transiting	Recreational fishing	Commercial fishing	Commercial aquaculture	Commercial tourism	Mining	Total area (km^{2})
National Park	II	Yes	No	No	No	excludes fishing, with approval	No	36,050
Recreational Use	II	Yes	Yes	No	No	excludes fishing, with approval	No	1,170
External link: Zoning and rules for the North-west Marine Parks Network

== See also ==
- Protected areas managed by the Australian government
