= Arafura Marine Park =

Marine protected area in Australia

- IUCN category VI (protected area with sustainable use of natural resources)
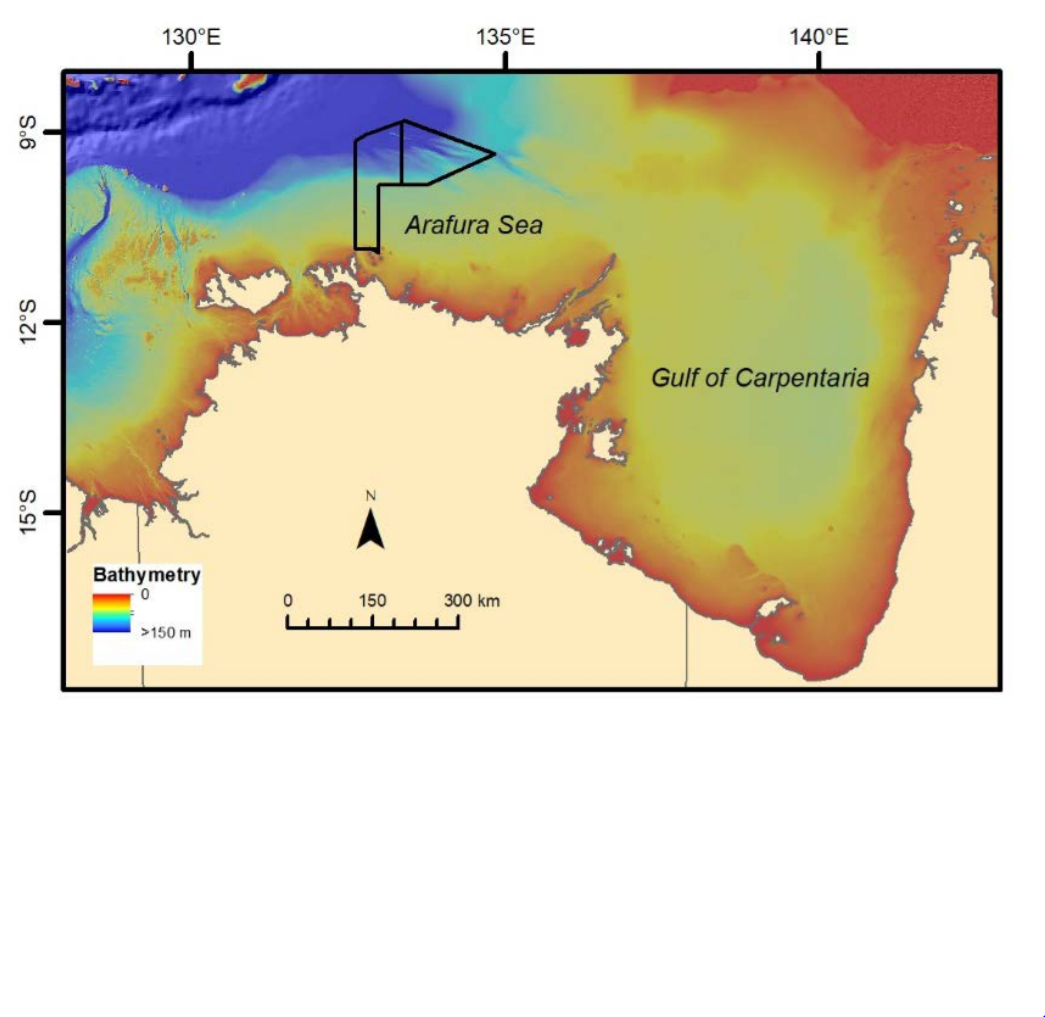

- Location within Northern Territory
- Location: Northern Territory
- Coordinates: 10°0′0″S 132°30′35″E
- Area: 22,924.1 km^{2} (8,851.0 sq mi)
- Established: 2018
- Website: https://parksaustralia.gov.au/marine/parks/north/arafura

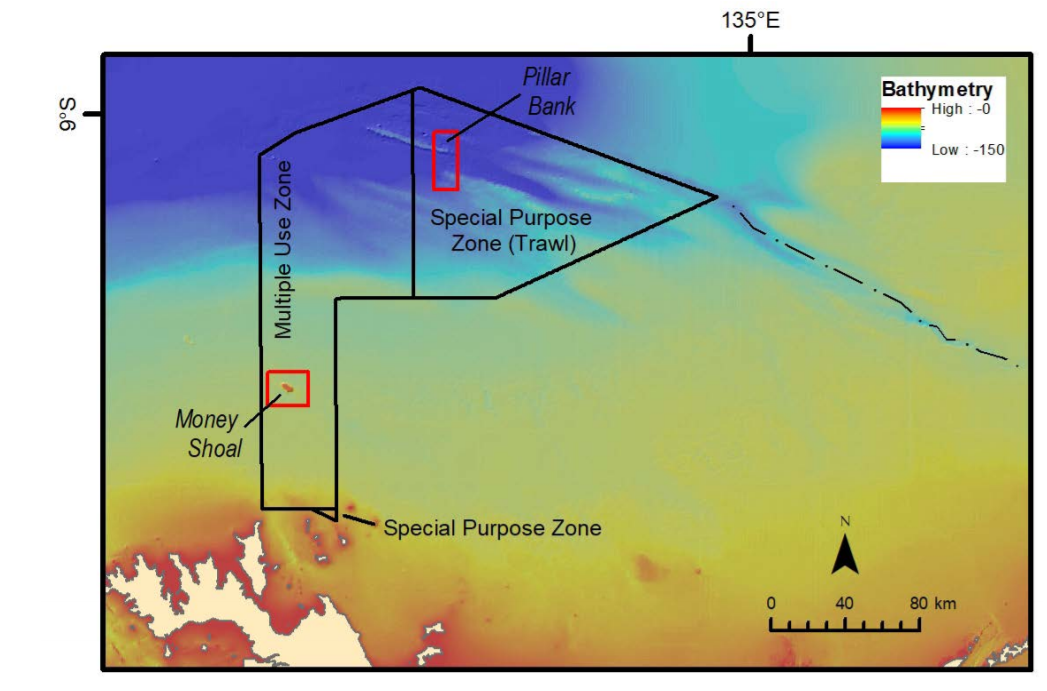
Figure. 1. Different usage zones

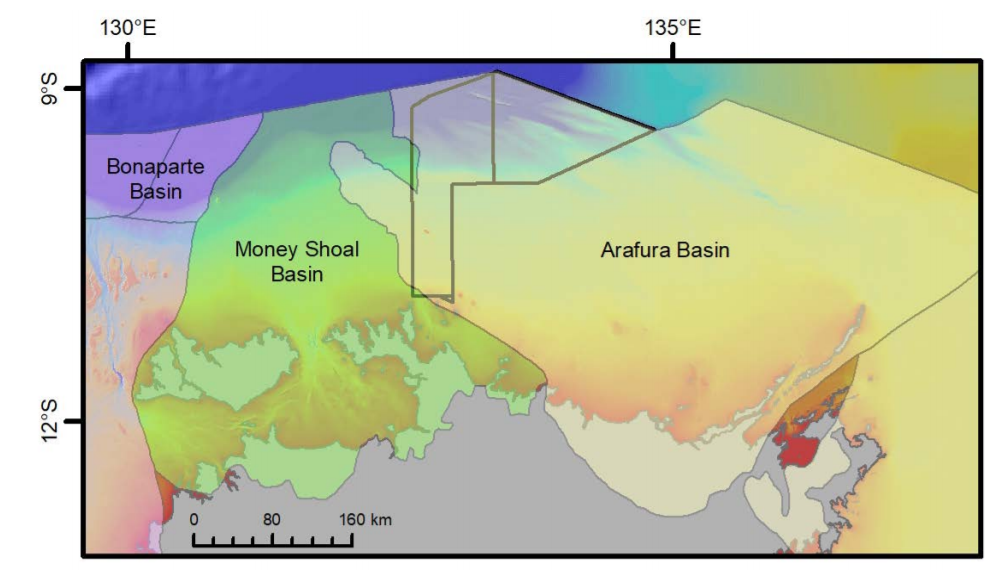
Figure 2. Geological features

The Arafura Marine Park, about 250 km (160 mi) north-east of Darwin, is Australia's most northern marine park, and is part of the North Network of Australian Marine Parks. The Aboriginal clans of Mandilarri-Ildugij, the Mangalara, the Murran, the Gadura-Minaga and the Ngaynjaharr whose sea country this is, share some of the responsibilities for the park.

The marine park covers 22,924 km^{2} (8,851 sq mi), and has depths from 5 metres (16 ft) to over 500 metres (1,600 ft).

The park is managed as an IUCN category VI park with three zones (see figure 1): a multiple use zone, a special purpose zone and a special purpose (trawl) zone. Important sections of the park (see figure 2) include the Money Shoal, which is an area of raised sea-bed, thought to have been produced by periods of coral reef growth during the Quaternary and differing sea levels.

Geomorphic features within the park.
| Geomorphic feature | Area | Proportion of park (%) |
| Apron | 2,591 km^{2} (1,000 sq mi) | 11.3 |
| Bank/Shoal | 31 km^{2} (12 sq mi) | 0.1 |
| Canyon | 6,856 km^{2} (2,647 sq mi) | 30.0 |
| Ridge | 681 km^{2} (263 sq mi) | 2.9 |
| Shelf (plain) | 22,390 km^{2} (8,640 sq mi) | 50.0 |
| Terrace | 1,146 km^{2} (442 sq mi) | 5.0 |

== Money Shoal ==
Money Shoal carries an abundant and varied assemblage of coral and organisms associated with coral reefs, an abundance of hard corals in the shallows, filter feeders on the shoal margins, while in the deeper areas of the sediment plains, there is little to no benthos.

== Money shoal gallery ==
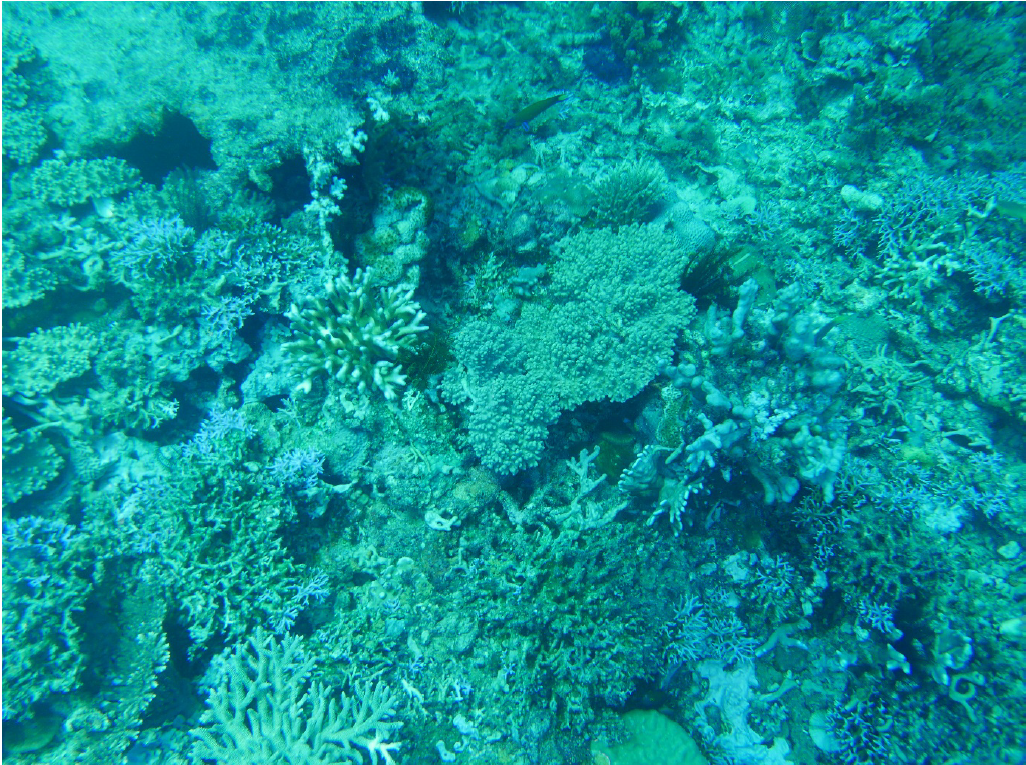
Dense Branching corals of Money Shoal

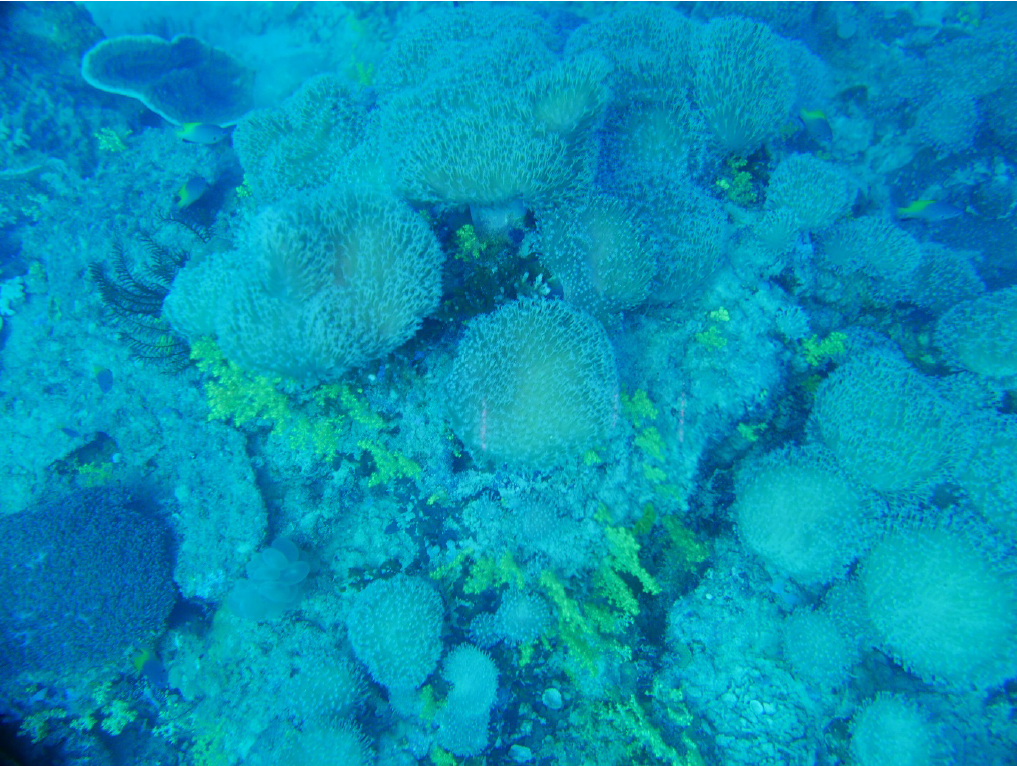
Soft coral and macroalgae dominated community in intermediate depths

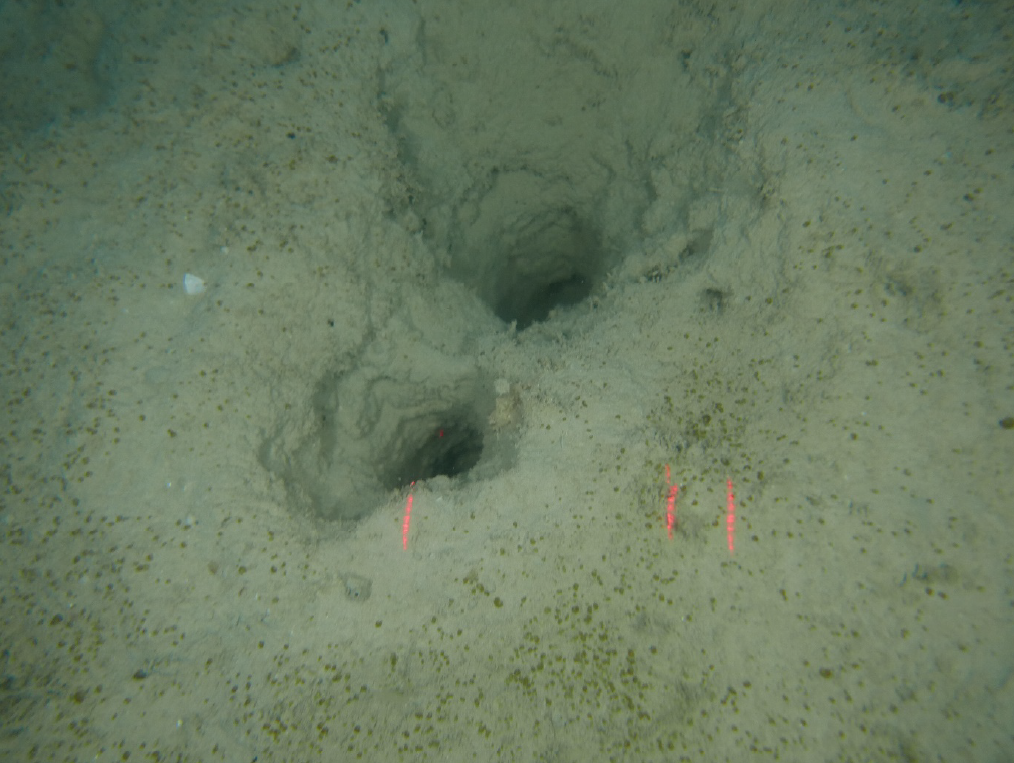
Benthic Community at Money Shoal

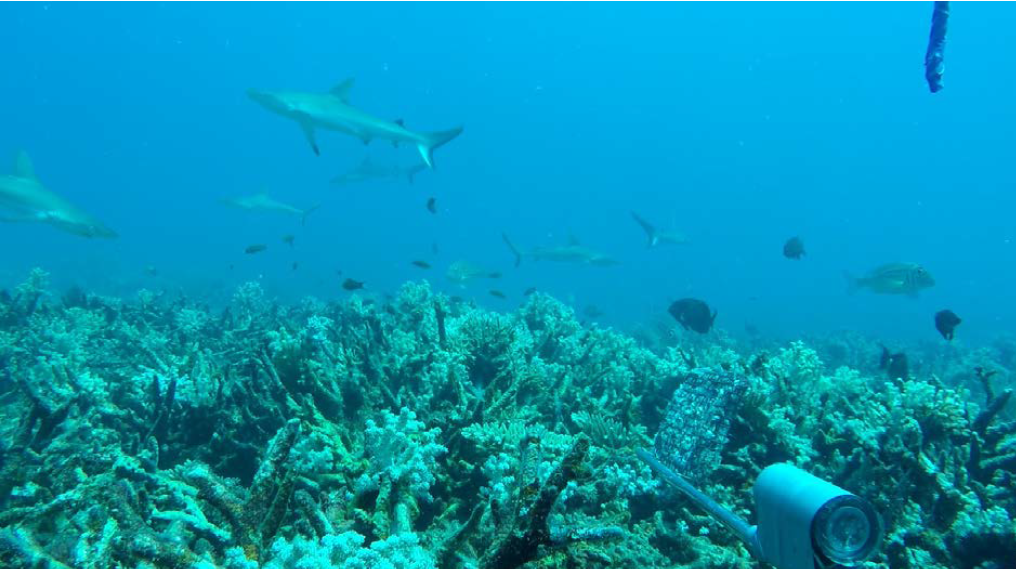
Grey reef sharks at Money Shoal

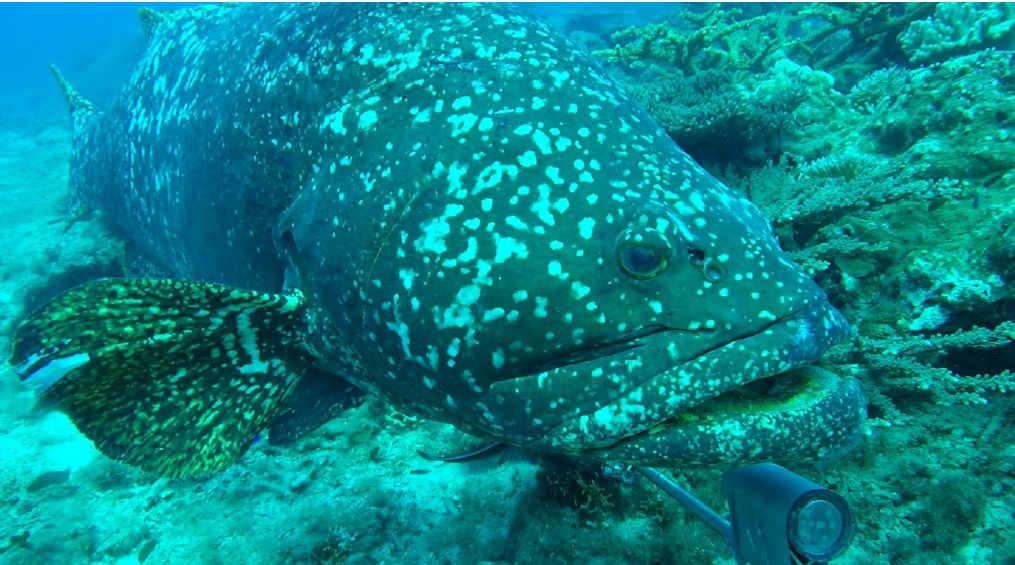
Epinephelus lanceolatus at Money Shoal

== Fauna ==
Taken from Galaiduk, et al. (2021)

- Chelonia mydas (Green turtle)
- Lepidochelys olivacea (Olive Ridley Turtle)
- Carcharhinus sorrah (spot-tail shark)
- Lutjanus malabaricus, Lutjanus erythropterus (red snappers)
- Lutjanus sebae (red emperor)
- Pristipomoides multidens (goldband snapper)

== See also ==
- Australian marine parks
