= Montebello Islands Marine Park =

Australian marine park

Montebello Island Marine Park
- IUCN category II (national park)
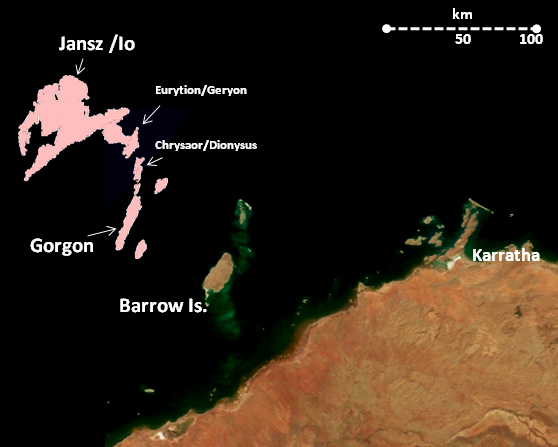
- Gorgon-Gasfield and Barrow-Island

- Location within Western Australia
- Location: Western Australia
- Nearest city: Karratha
- Coordinates: 20.4806°S 115.4761°E
- Area: 58,344 ha (225.27 sq mi)
- Established: 10 December 2004
- Governing body: Department of Biodiversity, Conservation and Attractions

The Montebello Island Marine Park (area 58,331 ha) is located off the northwest coast of Western Australia, about 1,600 km north of Perth, and 120 km west of Dampier. The reserve includes the entire group of Montebello Islands.

Close to the marine park is one of the most important oil and gas extraction zones in Australia, the Gorgon gas field, and it is also one of the most important breeding and nesting sites for sea turtles.

There are two large contiguous protected areas: Barrow Island Marine Park (4169 hectares) and Barrow Island Marine Management Area (114,693 hectares).

in 1952 and 1956, British-Australian atomic tests took place on/near Alpha and Tremouille Islands in the Montebello group.

== Flora and fauna ==
Amongst the larger forms of sealife found in the marine protected area are: the Flatback sea turtle, Green sea turtle, Hawksbill sea turtle, the occasional loggerhead sea turtle, minke whale, toothed whale, Bryde's whale, humpback whales, sperm whales, short-finned pilot whale, killer whales, false killer whales, common dolphins, striped dolphins, bottlenose dolphins and dugong.

There are 150 species of hard corals in the marine area, over 450 fish species, 170 species of echinoderms and over 630 species of molluscs. Six mangrove species occur on the coast, and within lagoons.

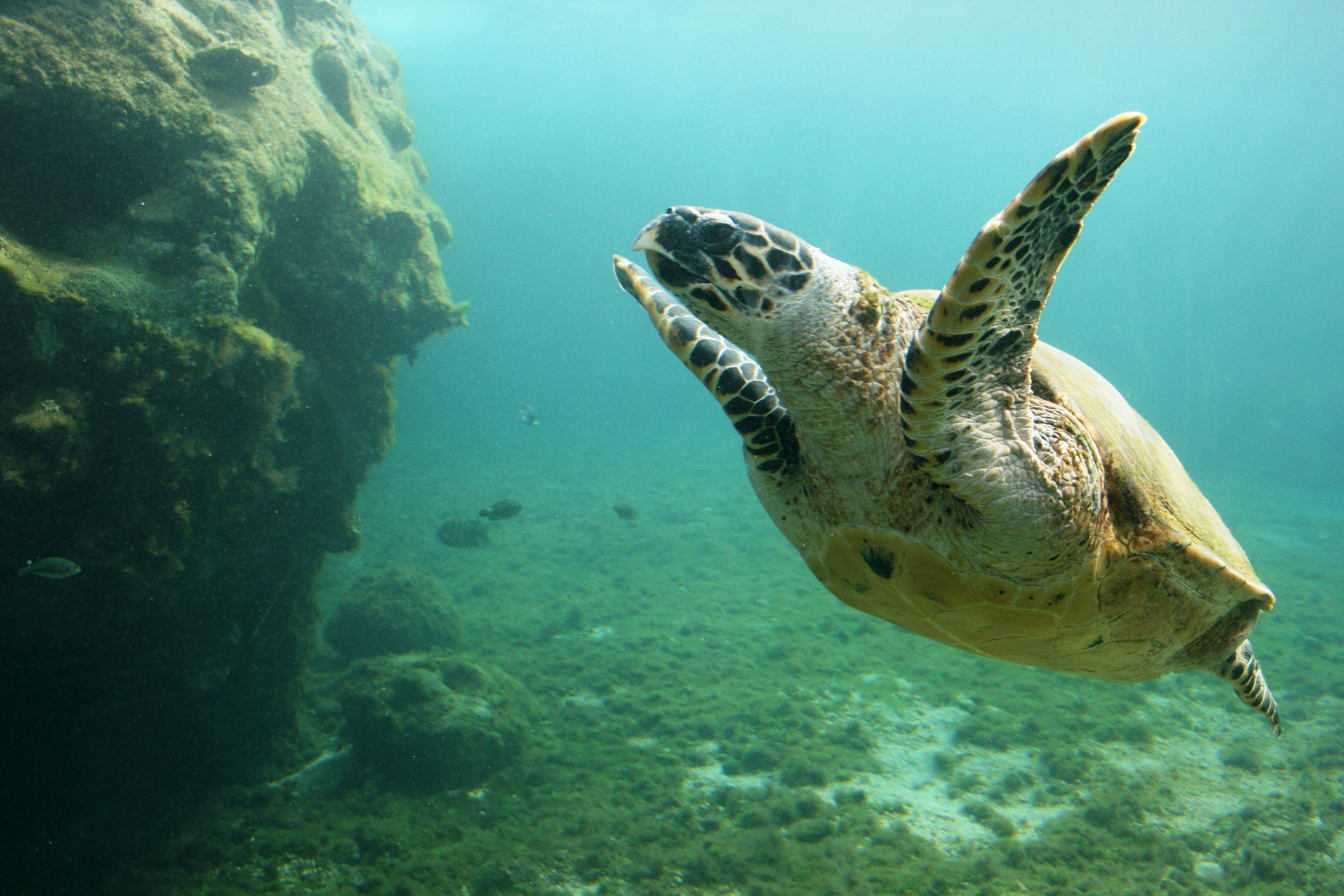
Hawksbill sea turtle

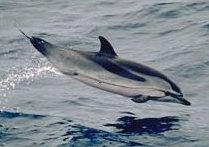
Striped dolphin

Killer whale

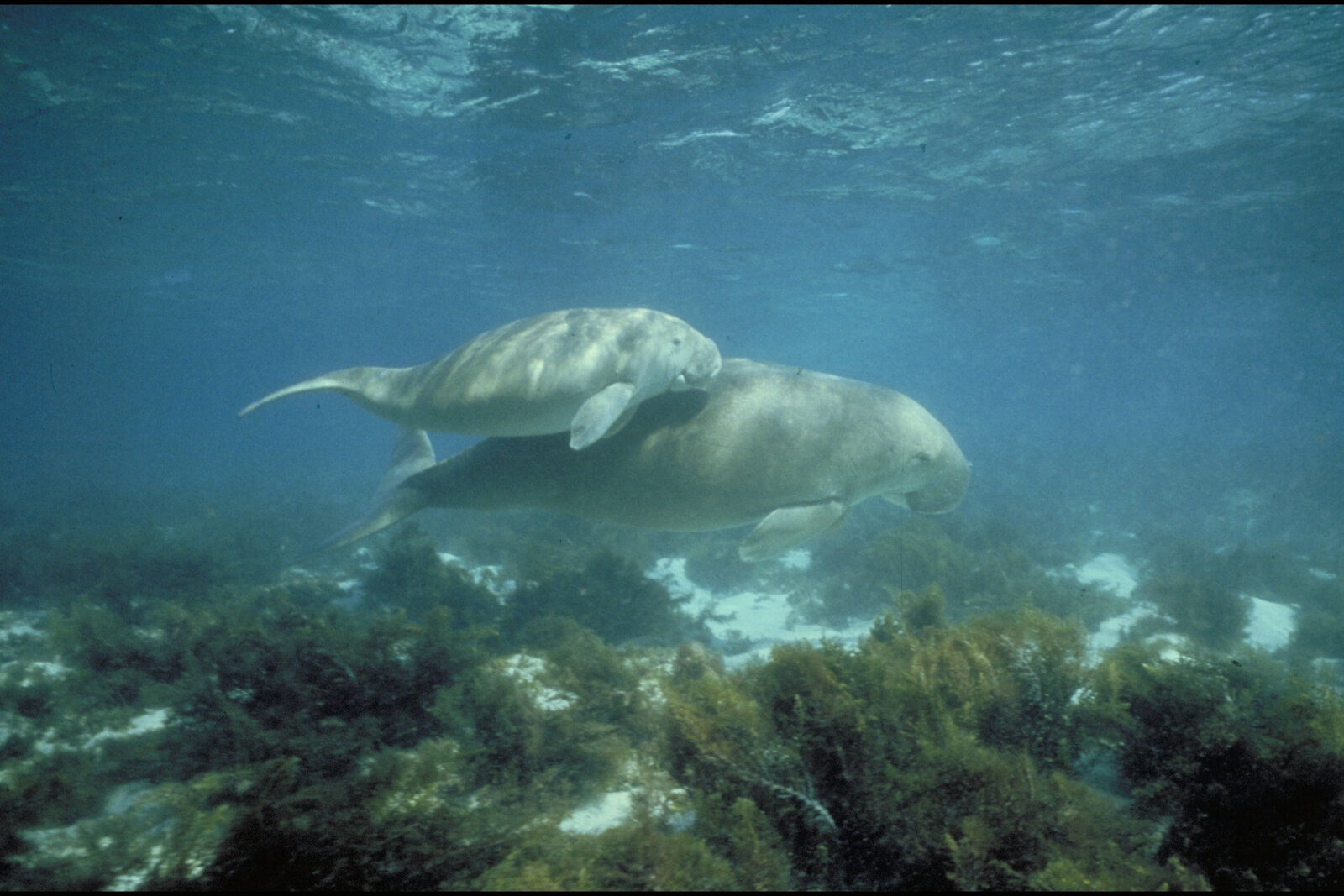
Dugongs

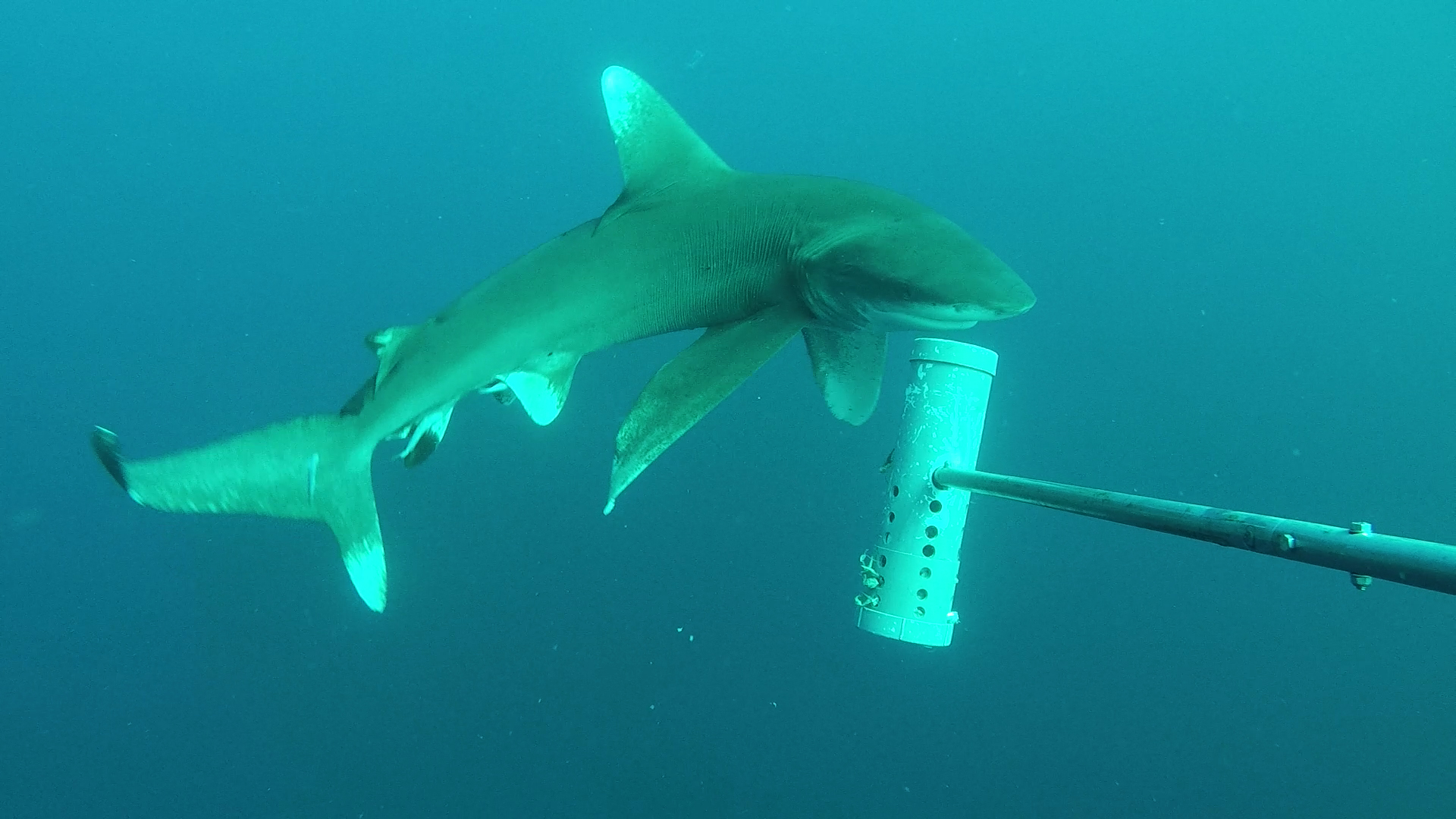
Carcharhinus longimanus

== Economic uses ==
The Gorgon gas fields contain approximately 40 Tcf of gas.

Commercial fishing for sharks and turtles occurs in addition to recreational fishing. Nature tourism with diving, snorkelling, wildlife observation and water sports is also important. Additionally, cultured pearl production has been carried out in the area since 1902.

== Other ==
Archaeological traces of Aborigines have not yet been found on the coast of this park.
