= Protected areas of Australia =

Protected areas in Australia

Protected areas of Australia include Commonwealth and off-shore protected areas managed by the Australian government, as well as protected areas within each of the six states of Australia and two self-governing territories, the Australian Capital Territory and the Northern Territory, which are managed by the eight state and territory governments.

Commonwealth and off-shore protected areas in the Australian Capital Territory, the Northern Territory, the Christmas Island Territory, the Cocos (Keeling) Islands Territory, the Norfolk Island Territory and the Australian Antarctic Territory are managed by Director of National Parks, an agency within the Department of Climate Change, Energy, the Environment and Water, with the exception of the Great Barrier Reef Marine Park, which is managed by the Great Barrier Reef Marine Park Authority, a separate body within the department.

As of May 2025 protected areas cover 173,493,468 km^{2} (66,986,202 sq mi) of Australia's land area, or about 22.57% of the total land area. The Australian Capital Territory has the highest level of protection at nearly 56% of its territory, followed by Tasmania with 43% and Western Australia with 31%. The lowest level of protection is in Queensland and New South Wales with 9.36% and 10.44% respectively. Of all protected areas, two-thirds are considered strictly protected (IUCN categories I to IV), and the rest is mostly managed resources protected area (IUCN category VI). Around 38% of the protected area in Australia is publicly owned and managed by the Australian government or state and territory governments. The largest component of protected areas are the Indigenous Protected Areas, at over 49% and growing as of February 2022.

== Protected areas managed by the Australian government ==
The following list shows only the Commonwealth and off-shore protected areas that are managed by the Australian government which represents a small portion of all protected areas located in Australia. Each state and territory is responsible for the management of the protected areas under its jurisdiction with exception to protected areas such as the Uluru-Kata Tjuta National Park in the Northern Territory. The majority of Australian protected areas are managed by the state and territory governments.

=== National Parks ===
The following protected areas which are designated as national parks are managed by the Australian government and in some instances in conjunction with indigenous land owners:

- Booderee (owned by the Wreck Bay Aboriginal Community and co-managed)
- Christmas Island
- Kakadu
- Norfolk Island
- Pulu Keeling
- Uluru-Kata Tjuta

Australia's first national park - and the second in the world - is Royal National Park in New South Wales, established in 1879.

=== National Heritage List ===
The National Heritage List is a heritage register, a list of national heritage places deemed to be of outstanding heritage significance to Australia, established in 2003. The list includes natural and historic places, including those of cultural significance to Indigenous Australians. Once on the National Heritage List the provisions of the Environment Protection and Biodiversity Conservation Act 1999 apply. Some of these also form part of the World Heritage Sites listed in a separate section below.

=== Botanical Gardens ===
- Australian National
- Booderee (owned by the Wreck Bay Aboriginal Community and co-managed)
- Norfolk Island

=== Antarctic Specially Protected Areas ===
As of 2014 there are 12 Antarctic Specially Protected Areas

- Amanda Bay
- Ardery Island and Odbert Island
- Clark Peninsula
- Frazier Islands
- Hawker Island
- Marine Plain
- Mawson's Huts
- North-eastern Bailey Peninsula
- Rookery Islands
- Scullin and Murray Monoliths
- Stornes
- Taylor Rookery

=== Antarctic Specially Managed Areas ===
As of 2014 there is 1 Antarctic Specially Managed Area

- Larsemann Hills

=== Commonwealth Marine reserves ===
The Australian Government manages an estate of marine protected areas known as Commonwealth marine reserves (CMR) which was established under the Environment Protection and Biodiversity Conservation Act 1999 (EPBC Act). These marine reserves are in Australian waters, but not state or territory waters. A majority of the reserves are not in effect until new managements plans are released following a review of reserves established in 2012.

In addition to the Coral Sea CMR and the Heard Island and McDonald Islands CMR, there are a further 57 Commonwealth marine reserves grouped into 5 geographical regions called Commonwealth marine reserve networks:

- North network (8 reserves)
- North-west network (13 reserves)
- Temperate East network (8 reserves)
- South-east network (14 reserves)
- South-west network (14 reserves)

=== Calperum and Taylorville Stations ===
Calperum and Taylorville Stations are pastoral leases located next to each other near Renmark in South Australia and which were purchased for conservation purposes using both private and Australian government funds. Calperum Station was purchased by the Chicago Zoological Society in 1993 while Taylorville Station was purchased by the Australian Landscape Trust in 2000 with the ownership of both leases being deeded to the Director of National Parks. Both properties are managed by the Australian Landscape Trust.

== Protection arising from Australian government policy and international obligations ==
=== World Heritage listed areas ===
As of April 2020, the following sites are listed by UNESCO as World Heritage Sites:

- Australian Fossil Mammal Sites (Riversleigh, Qld and Naracoorte, SA)
- Australian Convict Sites, consisting of 11 remnant sites
- Budj Bim Cultural Landscape, Vic
- Fraser Island, Qld
- Gondwana Rainforests of Australia, formerly Central Eastern Rainforest Reserves
- Great Barrier Reef, Qld
- Greater Blue Mountains Area, NSW
- Heard and McDonald Islands, Antarctica
- Kakadu National Park, NT
- Lord Howe Island
- Macquarie Island
- Ningaloo Coast, WA
- Purnululu National Park, WA
- Royal Exhibition Building and Carlton Gardens
- Shark Bay, WA
- Sydney Opera House
- Tasmanian Wilderness
- Uluru-Kata Tjuta National Park, NT
- Wet Tropics of Queensland
- Willandra Lakes Region, NSW

=== Indigenous protected areas ===
An Indigenous Protected Area (IPA) is a class of protected area formed by agreement with Indigenous Australians and formally recognised by the Australian government as being part of the National Reserve System. As of April 2020 there are 93 IPAs occupying about 106,000,000 hectares (260,000,000 acres) and comprising more than 49% of the National Reserve System.

=== Biosphere reserves ===
The following biosphere reserves belonging to the UNESCO World Biosphere Reserve program are located within Australia:

- Croajingolong, Victoria (1977)
- Riverland, South Australia (1977)
- Kosciuszko, New South Wales (1977)
- Prince Regent River, Western Australia (1977)
- Mamungari (formerly Unnamed), South Australia (1977)
- Uluru (Ayers Rock-Mount Olga), Northern Territory (1977)
- Yathong (1977)
- Fitzgerald River, Western Australia (1978)
- Hattah-Kulkyne and Murray-Kulkyne, Victoria (1981)
- Wilsons Promontory, Victoria (1981)
- Mornington Peninsula and Western Port, Victoria (2002)
- Barkindji, New South Wales (2005)
- Noosa, Queensland (2007)
- Great Sandy, Queensland (2009)

=== Ramsar sites ===
As a contracting party to the Convention on Wetlands of International Importance (known as the Ramsar Convention), Australia is encouraged "to nominate sites containing representative, rare or unique wetlands, or that are important for conserving biological diversity, to the List of Wetlands of International Importance". As of March 2014, the Australian Government has nominated 65 Ramsar sites.

== Management by Australian states and territories ==
- Protected areas of the Australian Capital Territory
- Protected areas of New South Wales
- Protected areas of the Northern Territory
- Protected areas of Queensland
- Protected areas of South Australia
- Protected areas of Tasmania
- Protected areas of Victoria
- Protected areas of Western Australia

== Other conservation organisations ==
There is a number of private and government organisations involved in conservation in Australia.

== See also ==
- Australia's National Reserve System
- Australian Whale Sanctuary
- Conservation park (Australia)
- List of national parks of Australia
- Wild River § Wild Rivers in Australia
