= Director of National Parks =

Australian Government corporation

Agency overview
- Formed: April 1975
- Preceding agency: Director of National Parks and Wildlife
- Jurisdiction: Government of Australia
- Headquarters: John Gorton Building, King Edward Terrace, Parkes ACT, Australia; 35°18′07″S 149°08′03″E
- Employees: 375.95 (Full time equivalent) as of December 2022
- Minister responsible: Minister for the Environment
- Parent department: Department of Climate Change, Energy, the Environment and Water
- Child agency: Parks Australia Division Structure July
- Key document: EPBC Act
- Website: parksaustralia.gov.au

In Australia, the Director of National Parks is a Commonwealth corporate entity responsible for the management of a portfolio of terrestrial and marine protected areas proclaimed under the Environment Protection and Biodiversity Conservation Act 1999 (EPBC Act).

Parks Australia (formerly the Australian Nature Conservation Agency and the Australian National Parks and Wildlife Service) is a division of the Department of Climate Change, Energy, the Environment and Water which supports the Director of National Parks in the management of six Commonwealth national parks, the Australian National Botanic Gardens, and 60 Australian marine parks.

== Legal status and history ==
The Director of National Parks was established under the EPBC Act as a corporation sole, i.e. the corporation is constituted by the person appointed to the office named the Director of National Parks.

It was established on 17 July 2000 upon the proclamation of the EPBC Act and is a continuation of the office of the Director of National Parks and Wildlife which existed under the National Parks and Wildlife Conservation Act 1975.

As at November 2023, the office is held by Ronald 'Ricky' Archer, former CEO of North Australian Indigenous Land and Sea Management Alliance Ltd (NAILSMA). Ricky Archer is a Djungan man and made history by becoming the first Indigenous person to hold the position. The Director position leads conservation efforts, the recovery and management of some of Australia's most prized national parks in conjunction with Traditional Owners.

== Responsibilities ==
The Director of National Parks’ responsibilities under the EPBC Act include:

- Managing Commonwealth reserves and conservation zones
- Protecting biodiversity and heritage in Commonwealth reserves and conservation zones
- Carrying out research relevant to Commonwealth reserves
- Cooperating with other countries to establish and manage national parks and nature reserves in those countries
- Making recommendations to the Australian Government Minister for the Environment.

== Portfolio and delegations ==
The Director of National Parks’ portfolio consists of the following groups of protected areas:

1. Six Commonwealth national parks
2. The Australian National Botanic Gardens
3. 60 Australian marine parks and
4. One Commonwealth marine reserve.

The management of the Heard Island and McDonald Islands Marine Reserve has been delegated by the Director of National Parks to the Australian Antarctic Division, another agency within the Department of the Environment and Energy.

The portfolio does not include the Great Barrier Reef Marine Park because this protected area is managed by another departmental agency, the Great Barrier Reef Marine Park Authority.

== Parks Australia ==
Parks Australia (formerly the Australian Nature Conservation Agency and the Australian National Parks and Wildlife Service) is a division of the Department of Climate Change, Energy, the Environment and Water since 2022, previously the Department of Agriculture, Water and the Environment [2020]. Parks Australia staff are part of the federal environment portfolio. They support the Director of National Parks in the management of six Commonwealth national parks including Kakadu National Park, Uluru-Kata Tjuta National Park, Booderee National Park, Christmas Island National Park, Pulu Keeling National Park and Norfolk Island National Park, the Australian National Botanic Gardens, and Australian Marine Parks.

== See also ==
- NSW National Parks & Wildlife Service
- Protected areas managed by the Australian government
