= Sardinia Bay Marine Protected Area =

Marine conservation area in the Eastern Cape in South Africa

- Sardinia Bay MPA location
- Location: Off Port Elizabeth in the Eastern Cape province, South Africa
- Nearest city: Port Elizabeth
- Coordinates: 34°02.6′S 25°31′E
- Area: 12.9 km^{2} (5.0 sq mi)
- Established: 1990
- Governing body: Nelson Mandela Bay Metropolitan Municipality
- Sardinia Bay Marine Protected Area (South Africa)

The Sardinia Bay Marine Protected Area is an inshore conservation region in the territorial waters of the Eastern Cape province, South Africa

== History ==
Established in 1990, the MPA was proclaimed by the Minister of Environmental Affairs and Tourism, (Mohammed Valli Moosa, in Government Gazette No. 21948 of 29 December 2000 in terms section 43 of the Marine Living Resources Act, 18 of 1998.

== Purpose ==
A marine protected area is defined by the IUCN as "A clearly defined geographical space, recognised, dedicated and managed, through legal or other effective means, to achieve the long-term conservation of nature with associated ecosystem services and cultural values".

== Extent ==
The MPA is between Schoenmakerskop and Seaview along the coast to the west of Port Elizabeth, adjacent to the Sardinia Bay Nature Reserve. It is 7 km long and extends one nautical mile out to sea. The tidal and subtidal shoreline has both rocky and sandy areas. 12,91 km^{2} of ocean is protected. The MPA is a restricted area - no fishing or collection of marine life is allowed.

== Management ==
The marine protected areas of South Africa are the responsibility of the national government, which has management agreements with a variety of MPA management authorities, in this case, Nelson Mandela Bay Metropolitan Municipality, which manages the MPA with funding from the SA Government through the Department of Environmental Affairs (DEA).

The Department of Agriculture, Forestry and Fisheries is responsible for issuing permits, quotas and law enforcement.

== Ecology ==
Marine ecoregions of the South African Exclusive Economic Zone: Sardinia Bay Marine Protected Area is in the Agulhas ecoregion

The MPA is in the warm temperate Agulhas inshore marine bioregion to the east of Cape Point which extends eastwards to the Mbashe River. There are a large proportion of species endemic to South Africa along this coastline.

Four major habitats exist in the sea in this region, distinguished by the nature of the substrate. The substrate, or base material, is important in that it provides a base to which an organism can anchor itself, which is vitally important for those organisms which need to stay in one particular kind of place. Rocky shores and reefs provide a firm fixed substrate for the attachment of plants and animals. Some of these may have kelp forests, which reduce the effect of waves and provide food and shelter for an extended range of organisms. Sandy beaches and bottoms are a relatively unstable substrate and cannot anchor kelp or many of the other benthic organisms. Finally there is open water, above the substrate and clear of the kelp forest, where the organisms must drift or swim. Mixed habitats are also frequently found, which are a combination of those mentioned above. There are no significant estuarine habitats in the MPA.

Rocky shores and reefs There are rocky reefs and mixed rocky and sandy bottoms. For many marine organisms the substrate is another type of marine organism, and it is common for several layers to co-exist. Examples of this are red bait pods, which are usually encrusted with sponges, ascidians, bryozoans, anemones, and gastropods, and abalone, which are usually covered by similar seaweeds to those found on the surrounding rocks, usually with a variety of other organisms living on the seaweeds.

The type of rock of the reef is of some importance, as it influences the range of possibilities for the local topography, which in turn influences the range of habitats provided, and therefore the diversity of inhabitants. Sandstone and other sedimentary rocks erode and weather very differently, and depending on the direction of dip and strike, and steepness of the dip, may produce reefs which are relatively flat to very high profile and full of small crevices. These features may be at varying angles to the shoreline and wave fronts. There are fewer large holes, tunnels and crevices in sandstone reefs, but often many deep but low near-horizontal crevices.

Kelp forests Kelp forests are a variation of rocky reefs, as the kelp requires a fairly strong and stable substrate which can withstand the loads of repeated waves dragging on the kelp plants. The Sea bamboo Ecklonia maxima grows in water which is shallow enough to allow it to reach to the surface with its gas-filled stipes, so that the fronds form a dense layer at or just below the surface, depending on the tide. The shorter Split-fan kelp Laminaria pallida grows mostly on deeper reefs, where there is not so much competition from the sea bamboo. Both these kelp species provide food and shelter for a variety of other organisms, particularly the Sea bamboo, which is a base for a wide range of epiphytes, which in turn provide food and shelter for more organisms.

Sandy beaches and bottoms (including shelly, pebble and gravel bottoms) Sandy bottoms at first glance appear to be fairly barren areas, as they lack the stability to support many of the spectacular reef based species, and the variety of large organisms is relatively low. The sand is continually being moved around by wave action, to a greater or lesser degree depending on weather conditions and exposure of the area. This means that sessile organisms must be specifically adapted to areas of relatively loose substrate to thrive in them, and the variety of species found on a sandy or gravel bottom will depend on all these factors. Sandy bottoms have one important compensation for their instability, animals can burrow into the sand and move up and down within its layers, which can provide feeding opportunities and protection from predation. Other species can dig themselves holes in which to shelter, or may feed by filtering water drawn through the tunnel, or by extending body parts adapted to this function into the water above the sand.

The open sea The pelagic water column is the major part of the living space at sea. This is the water between the surface and the top of the benthic zone, where living organisms swim, float or drift, and the food chain starts with phytoplankton, the mostly microscopic photosynthetic organisms that convert the energy of sunlight into organic material which feeds nearly everything else, directly or indirectly. In temperate seas there are distinct seasonal cycles of phytoplankton growth, based on the available nutrients and the available sunlight. Either can be a limiting factor. Phytoplankton tend to thrive where there is plenty of light, and they themselves are a major factor in restricting light penetration to greater depths, so the photosynthetic zone tends to be shallower in areas of high productivity. Zooplankton feed on the phytoplankton, and are in turn eaten by larger animals. The larger pelagic animals are generally faster moving and more mobile, giving them the option of changing depth to feed or to avoid predation, and to move to other places in search of a better food supply.

=== Marine species diversity ===
==== Endemism ====
The MPA is in the warm temperate Agulhas ecoregion to the east of Cape Point which extends eastwards to the Mbashe River. There are a large proportion of species endemic to South Africa along this coastline.

== Threats ==
Abalone poaching in the MPA is considered a major threat and has severely impacted stocks, and incidents of illegal commercial and recreational fishing have been reported to the police & the department has looked into it .

== See also ==
Marine protected areas of South Africa
- List of protected areas of South Africa
- Marine protected areas of South Africa – Protected areas of coastline or ocean in the EEZ of South Africa
