= Hluleka Marine Protected Area =

Marine conservation area in the Eastern Cape in South Africa

- Hluleka MPA location
- Location: Eastern Cape, South Africa
- Nearest city: Port St. Johns
- Coordinates: 31°49′S 29°19′E
- Area: 40.86 km^{2} (15.78 sq mi)
- Established: 2000
- Governing body: Eastern Cape Parks and Tourism Agency
- Hluleka Marine Protected Area (South Africa)

The Hluleka Marine Protected Area is an inshore conservation region in the territorial waters of the Eastern Cape province of South Africa.

Situated in the heart of the Wild Coast, this small MPA safeguards an estuary and secret rocky and sandy shores. It is a Marine Protected Area (MPA), which is an area of coastline or ocean that is specially protected for the benefit of people and nature.

== History ==
The MPA was proclaimed by the Minister of Environmental Affairs and Tourism, Mohammed Valli Moosa, in Government Gazette No. 21948 of 29 December 2000 in terms section 43 of the Marine Living Resources Act, 18 of 1998.

== Purpose ==
A marine protected area is defined by the IUCN as "A clearly defined geographical space, recognised, dedicated and managed, through legal or other effective means, to achieve the long-term conservation of nature with associated ecosystem services and cultural values". MPAs help manage part of the marine environment to promote fisheries sustainability, keep marine ecosystems working properly, and protect the range of species living there, helping people to benefit from the ocean. In South Africa, MPAs are declared through the National Environmental Management: Protected Areas Act.

== Extent ==
Hluleka Marine Protected Area is in the Eastern Cape Province. about 20 km south of Port St Johns. 4 km of coastline and 40.86 km^{2} of ocean are protected.This 40.86 km2 MPA stretches approximately 3.7km from the northern point of the Hluleka Nature Reserve south of the Mnenu River to the southern boundary of the reserve north of the Mtakatyi River. It extends 10.8km out to sea making it a very narrow MPA. The little Hluleka River flows through and out of the forest into an open area with beautiful coral, quinine and fig trees. The MPA protects a wide diversity of marine habitats found along the Wild Coast including rocky shores and sandy beaches, an estuary and adjacent indigenous forests with many birds in the diverse coastal forest. On the shore the unusual bubble shaped rock formations were formed by rapidly cooling volcanic lava millions of year ago, while the rich marine life on these rocky shores provide hours of fascination for visitors. The intertidal rock pools and shallow subtidal reefs harbour fish such as blacktail, zebra, white musselcracker and bronze bream, and invertebrates such as the East Coast rock lobster. A perfect holiday destination for families, the diversity of plant and animal life both above and below water encourage young explorers to connect with nature in a safe environment. Proclaimed in 1991, this MPA is managed by the Eastern Cape Parks and Tourism Agency. The short stretch of the coastline within the MPA is closed to shore fishing and invertebrate harvesting and no boat-based fishing is allowed offshore in the MPA.

=== Boundaries ===
- Northern boundary: A line bearing 135° True from a beacon at approximately S31°,50′ E29°17.76′ in the Hluleka Nature Reserve where the game fence near the northern boundary of the nature reserve reaches the high-water mark
- Eastern boundary: A line six nautical miles to seaward of the high-water mark
- Southern boundary: A line bearing 135° True from a beacon at approximately S31°,48.82′ E29°19.14′ in the Hluleka Nature Reserve where the game fence near the southern boundary of the nature reserve reaches the high-water mark
- Western boundary: The high-water mark between approximately S31°,48.82′ E29°19.14′ and approximately S31°,50′ E29°17.76′

=== Zonation ===
The whole MPA is zoned as a no-take zone.

== Management ==
The marine protected areas of South Africa are the responsibility of the national government, which has management agreements with a variety of MPA management authorities, in this case, Eastern Cape Parks and Tourism Agency, which manages the MPA with funding from the SA Government through the Department of Environmental Affairs (DEA).

The Department of Agriculture, Forestry and Fisheries is responsible for issuing permits, quotas and law enforcement.

== Ecology ==
Marine ecoregions of the South African Exclusive Economic Zone: Hluleka Marine Protected Area is in the Agulhas ecoregion

The MPA is in the warm temperate Agulhas ecoregion to the east of Cape Point which extends eastwards to the Mbashe River. There are a large proportion of species endemic to South Africa along this coastline.

Four major habitats exist in the sea in this region, distinguished by the nature of the substrate. The substrate, or base material, is important in that it provides a base to which an organism can anchor itself, which is vitally important for those organisms which need to stay in one particular kind of place. Rocky shores and reefs provide a firm fixed substrate for the attachment of plants and animals. Some of these may have Kelp forests, which reduce the effect of waves and provide food and shelter for an extended range of organisms. Sandy beaches and bottoms are a relatively unstable substrate and cannot anchor kelp or many of the other benthic organisms. Finally there is open water, above the substrate and clear of the kelp forest, where the organisms must drift or swim. Mixed habitats are also frequently found, which are a combination of those mentioned above. There are no significant estuarine habitats in the MPA.

Rocky shores and reefs There are rocky reefs and mixed rocky and sandy bottoms. For many marine organisms the substrate is another type of marine organism, and it is common for several layers to co-exist. Examples of this are red bait pods, which are usually encrusted with sponges, ascidians, bryozoans, anemones, and gastropods, and abalone, which are usually covered by similar seaweeds to those found on the surrounding rocks, usually with a variety of other organisms living on the seaweeds.

The type of rock of the reef is of some importance, as it influences the range of possibilities for the local topography, which in turn influences the range of habitats provided, and therefore the diversity of inhabitants. Sandstone and other sedimentary rocks erode and weather very differently, and depending on the direction of dip and strike, and steepness of the dip, may produce reefs which are relatively flat to very high profile and full of small crevices. These features may be at varying angles to the shoreline and wave fronts. There are fewer large holes, tunnels and crevices in sandstone reefs, but often many deep but low near-horizontal crevices.

Sandy beaches and bottoms (including shelly, pebble and gravel bottoms) Sandy bottoms at first glance appear to be fairly barren areas, as they lack the stability to support many of the spectacular reef based species, and the variety of large organisms is relatively low. The sand is continually being moved around by wave action, to a greater or lesser degree depending on weather conditions and exposure of the area. This means that sessile organisms must be specifically adapted to areas of relatively loose substrate to thrive in them, and the variety of species found on a sandy or gravel bottom will depend on all these factors. Sandy bottoms have one important compensation for their instability, animals can burrow into the sand and move up and down within its layers, which can provide feeding opportunities and protection from predation. Other species can dig themselves holes in which to shelter, or may feed by filtering water drawn through the tunnel, or by extending body parts adapted to this function into the water above the sand.

The open sea The pelagic water column is the major part of the living space at sea. This is the water between the surface and the top of the benthic zone, where living organisms swim, float or drift, and the food chain starts with phytoplankton, the mostly microscopic photosynthetic organisms that convert the energy of sunlight into organic material which feeds nearly everything else, directly or indirectly. In temperate seas there are distinct seasonal cycles of phytoplankton growth, based on the available nutrients and the available sunlight. Either can be a limiting factor. Phytoplankton tend to thrive where there is plenty of light, and they themselves are a major factor in restricting light penetration to greater depths, so the photosynthetic zone tends to be shallower in areas of high productivity. Zooplankton feed on the phytoplankton, and are in turn eaten by larger animals. The larger pelagic animals are generally faster moving and more mobile, giving them the option of changing depth to feed or to avoid predation, and to move to other places in search of a better food supply.

=== Marine species diversity ===
==== Animals ====
Marine mammals:

- southern right whale
- humpback whale
- humpback dolphin
- bottlenose dolphin

==== Endemism ====
The MPA is in the warm temperate Agulhas ecoregion to the east of Cape Point which extends eastwards to the Mbashe River. There are a large proportion of species endemic to South Africa along this coastline.

== See also ==
Marine protected areas of South Africa
- List of protected areas of South Africa
- Marine protected areas of South Africa – Protected areas of coastline or ocean in the EEZ of South Africa
