= Marine protected areas of South Africa =

Protected areas of coastline or ocean in the EEZ of South Africa

Marine protected areas of South Africa'"`UNIQ--ref-00000001-QINU`"''"`UNIQ--ref-00000002-QINU`"'

The marine protected areas of South Africa are in an area of coastline or ocean within the exclusive economic zone (EEZ) of the Republic of South Africa that is protected in terms of specific legislation for the benefit of the environment and the people who live in and use it. An MPA is a place where marine life can thrive under less pressure than unprotected areas. They are like underwater parks, and this healthy environment can benefit neighbouring areas.

There are a total of 42 marine protected areas in the South African EEZ, after consolidation, with a total area of 15.5% of its Exclusive Economic Zone (EEZ). The target was to have 10% of the oceanic waters protected by 2020. All but one of the MPAs are in the exclusive economic zone off continental South Africa, and one is off the Prince Edward Islands in the Southern Ocean. Without the large Prince Edward Islands MPA, South Africa has 41 MPAs covering 5.4% of its continental EEZ. This achieves United Nations Sustainable Development Goal 14.5 for conservation of marine and coastal areas, and the Convention on Biological Diversity (CBD) Strategic Plan for Biodiversity 2011–2020 Aichi Target 11.

People can take part in a wide range of non-consumptive activities in all of South Africa's MPAs, and some parts of some MPAs are zoned for limited consumptive activities. Some of these activities require a permit, which is a form of taxation.

== Definition ==
The International Union for Conservation of Nature (IUCN) defines a marine protected area as:

A clearly defined geographical space, recognised, dedicated, and managed, through legal or other effective means, to achieve the long-term conservation of nature with associated ecosystem services and cultural values.

A marine protected area (MPA) is a protected area of sea or estuary. These areas can range from wildlife refuges to research facilities. MPAs restrict human activity for a conservation purpose, typically to protect natural or cultural resources. Such marine resources are protected by local, state, territorial, native, regional, national, or international authorities and differ substantially among and between nations. This variation includes different limitations on development, fishing practices, fishing seasons and catch limits, moorings and bans on removing or disrupting marine life. In some situations (such as with the Phoenix Islands Protected Area), MPAs also provide revenue for countries, potentially equal to the income that they would have if they were to grant companies permissions to fish.

As of August 2016 there are more than 13,650 MPAs, encompassing 2.07% of the world's oceans, with half of that area – encompassing 1.03% of the world's oceans – receiving complete "no-take" designation.

== Purpose and function ==
If there is no defined long-term goal for conservation and ecological recovery and extraction of marine resources occurs, the IUCN does not recognise a region as a marine protected area. The purposes stated for declaring South African marine protected areas include:

- Contribution towards a national and global representative system of marine protected areas by providing protection to benthic and pelagic ecosystems in various regions, including coastal habitats such as sandy beaches, rocky shores and estuaries offshore habitats such as soft sediment and reef systems, gravel, mud, sandy, and rocky habitats, shelf edge, submarine canyons and slope habitats, seamount and associated deep sea ecosystems, and open ocean pelagic habitats.
- Providing protection for sites of special sensitivity and sites that are critically endangered
- Providing large contiguous conservation areas, and links between inshore marine habitats with those further offshore, and providing contiguous conservation areas between marine, estuarine and terrestrial habitats.
- Protecting threatened seabed ecosystems, such as mud habitats, untrawled rocky shelf habitat and untrawled shelf edge areas.
- Conserving and protecting the biodiversity and ecological processes associated with these ecosystems, including threatened seabird species, threatened fish species and economically important invertebrate species.
- Providing an appropriate environment for research and monitoring of ecosystem health and biodiversity
- Contribute to sustainable marine and coastal ecotourism by zonation for activities which yield socio-economic benefits and protecting and promoting scenic areas and their eco-tourism opportunities
- Facilitating fisheries management by protecting spawning grounds and spawning stock, nursery, foraging, aggregation and refuge areas, allowing stock recovery, and improving abundance in adjacent areas for overexploited species, linefish and sharks;
- Facilitating sustainable use of linefish, rock lobster, abalone and intertidal resources
- Protection the biota or specific species and the environment, biodiversity and ecosystems that support them, including vulnerable benthic habitats, tropical and cold water coral reefs, canyons which are coelacanth habitat and important migratory corridors for seabirds, turtles, sharks and other fish
- Providing reference sites and environments for research and monitoring, including areas in good ecological condition and areas which may be indicators of impacts of climate change, and allowing for research on ecosystem impacts and recovery, and habitat requirements of economically important species
- Protecting areas of important cultural heritage, including archeological middens and fish traps, South African National Heritage sites and World Heritage sites.
- Conserving and protecting a fossilised forest.

MPAs have been shown to protect biodiversity and stocks of economically important marine organisms, and are also considered to protect cultural heritage, provide educational and recreational opportunities, provide sustainable employment, and stimulate tourism, and may assist with resilience to climate change.

=== Planning ===
Planning scenarios for site selection analysis include seabed protection, pelagic biodiversity, threatened species, sustainability of small pelagic and demersal trawl fisheries, inshore, offshore and crustacean trawl bycatch management, a range of sector-specific analyses exploring areas where spawning or nursery grounds can be protected, as well as integrated analysis of all targets for all objectives including minimising and spreading impact on industry. Scenarios also considered industry targets and spreading the impact fairly, and the impact on rights holders who operate in fixed areas such as diamond mining and petroleum extraction.

In recent planning, areas were considered in combination, with a recommendation to implement several new MPAs as a set, as this would speed up the process and allow a spatially efficient network that meets multiple combined objectives and minimises cumulative impact on industry. This plan was followed with the 2019 set of mostly offshore MPAs.

== History ==
South Africa's first MPA was the Tsitsikamma Marine Protected Area, which was declared in 1964. Several early MPAs were declared in terms of the Marine Living Resources Act, 18 of 1998, and they are currently declared through the National Environmental Management: Protected Areas Act 2003

The South African Association for Marine Biological Research (SAAMBR) was established by marine scientists who in 1947 recognised the unique character of the northern Zululand coast, which was later described as the Delagoa inshore ecoregion. The Oceanographic Research Institute (ORI) recognised that protection was necessary for effective conservation and in collaboration with the Natal Parks Board (now Ezemvelo KwaZulu-Natal Wildlife), established the St. Lucia Marine Reserve which was proclaimed in 1979, followed by the proclamation of the Maputaland Marine Reserve in 1986. These are now consolidated in the iSimangaliso Wetland Park, which was proclaimed as South Africa's first World Heritage Site in 1999. After nearly 20 years of work the Aliwal Shoal Marine Protected Area was proclaimed in 2004, along with the Pondoland Marine Protected Area, at the time the largest of South Africa's MPAs, and several others. By 2018, South Africa had 25 formally declared Marine Protected Areas, of which 24 are in the coastal waters of the continental territory, and one is in the waters of the Prince Edward Islands in the Southern Ocean.

Conservation authorities took into account the lack of protection for offshore benthic and pelagic habitats, and the Department of Environmental Affairs (DEA) developed the National Protection Area Expansion Strategy (NPAES) which was approved for implementation in March 2009. Subsequently, ten focus areas were identified for offshore biodiversity protection, and on 24 October 2018, 20 of the proposed 22 new MPAs were approved by Cabinet, and were proclaimed by the South African government on 24 May 2019, along with regulations for their management, in Government Gazettes Nos. 42478 and 42479 of 2019. Most of the new areas were slightly reduced from the recommended areas. The area proclaimed was 54214 km^{2}, while the proposed area was 68578 km^{2}. In some cases new areas were combined with existing MPAs, and the total number rose to 42.

Operation Phakisa is a South African government initiative intended to accelerate the implementation of solutions on critical development issues identified in the National Development Plan (NDP) 2030. Phakisa means "hurry up" in Sesotho and is intended to indicate urgency. The intention is to produce clear targets and plans and involves collaboration between key stakeholders in public and private sectors, academics and civil society organisations. The purposes stated for the new MPAs include facilitation of sustainable fisheries and use by other economic sectors, as well as the protection of offshore species and ecosystems. The 2008 NPAES was revised in 2016 and prioritised conservation of the areas gazetted following the Phakisa process.

The Marine Protection Services and Ocean Governance focus area is tasked with the development of an integrated governance framework for the exclusive economic zone to allow sustainable growth of the ocean economy.

== Extent ==
The EEZ of South Africa has a total area of approximately 1,547,576 km^{2} (597,522 sq mi).

The coastal MPAs before 2018 constituted 0.43% of the continental EEZ, and 0.16% of the EEZ was no-take zones. Offshore ecosystems were the least protected ecosystems of territory under South African management. The 20 new MPAs proclaimed by the South African government on 24 May 2019 increased the area of the continental protected areas to about 5.4%. To comply with the goals of the United Nations, another 5% of South African oceanic waters must be protected by 2020. With the inclusion of the large Southern Ocean Prince Edward Islands Marine Protected Area the total marine area protected is 15.5%, or

Coastal MPAs in the continental EEZ range in size from the Rocherpan Marine Protected Area on the Western Cape coast with 3 km (1.9 mi) of shoreline and extending 500 m (1,600 ft) seaward, to the iSimangaliso MPA in northern KwaZulu-Natal with 177 km (110 mi) of coastline some of which extends up to 107 km (66 mi) seaward. The offshore MPAs also vary considerably in size: Benguela Muds MPA is only 95 km^{2} (37 sq mi), while the two seamount MPAs are both more than 7,500 km^{2} (2,900 sq mi).

The coastal MPAs protect about 34% of the continental shoreline, of which about 12% is classified as restricted zone, based on a coastline length of 3,113 km (1,934 mi) (the coastline length was previously estimated at 3,656 km (2,272 mi)). 5.4% of the continental EEZ is protected, of which about 3% is restricted zone. The Prince Edward Islands MPA is the largest, with 181,247 km^{2} (69,980 sq mi), which is 38.17% of the archipelago's EEZ.

=== Distribution ===
Coastal MPAs are distributed along the coastline from the Namaqua National Park Marine Protected Area on the west coast, to the iSimangaliso MPA on the east coast, which extends up to the South African – Mozambique border. The continental offshore MPAs are distributed through the EEZ from the border of Namibia to near Durban, on the east coast, to provide best coverage of the variety of habitats and ecosystems. Protea Banks MPA is closest to the mainland shore with depths starting at about 30 m, while parts of the Agulhas Front MPA and Southwest Indian Ocean and Atlantic Seamount MPAs are near the outer edge of the EEZ, and include abyssal benthic habitats more than 4,000 m (13,000 ft) deep.

The MPAs provide habitat protection for beaches, rocky shores, coastal and open ocean islands, lagoons, pans, estuaries and offshore shoals.

== Legislation ==
- Marine Living Resources Act, 18 of 1998 – South African statutory law to provide for the conservation of the marine ecosystem, as amended in 2014
- National Environmental Management: Biodiversity Act, 10 of 2004, as amended in 2014
- National Environmental Management: Integrated Coastal Management Act, No. 24 of 2008, as amended 2014
- National Environmental Management: Protected Areas Act 2003, as amended in 2014
- National Protected Areas Expansion Strategy 2008, revised 2016
- National Environmental Management Act, 1998 – South African statutory law for environmental management, as amended in 2009
- Minerals Petroleum Resources Development Act, 2002
- World Heritage Convention Act, 1999

The earliest proclamations of marine protected areas in South Africa were under the Sea Fisheries Acts of 1973 and 1988 and amendments. From 1998 they were declared under Section 43 of the Marine Living Resources Act, after which the management of fisheries was separated from MPAs, which were thereafter grouped with terrestrial conservation areas under the National Environmental Management Act: Protected Areas Act, No. 10 of 2004, by the 2014 amendment, and all pre-existing MPAs were transferred by presidential pronouncement to section 22A of the NEM: PAA, published on 2 June 2014 in Government Gazette No. 37710.

=== Management ===
The South African Constitution makes the national government responsible for protecting the environment. Originally the management of MPAs and fisheries was the responsibility of the Marine and Coastal Management branch of the Department of Environmental Affairs and Tourism (DEAT), but the department was split in 2009 into the Department of Environmental Affairs, the Department of Agriculture, Forestry and Fisheries, and the Department of Tourism, and management of the marine environment was shared by the Department of Environmental Affairs and the Department of Agriculture, Forestry and Fisheries. This continued until 2019 when another reshuffle of portfolios created the Department of Environment Forestry and Fisheries, which was allocated the responsibility for MPAs.

The Department of Environmental Affairs has management agreements with a variety of MPA management authorities, such as CapeNature, City of Cape Town (CoCT), Eastern Cape Parks and Tourism Agency (ECPTA), Nelson Mandela Bay Metro (NMBM), South African National Parks (SANParks), Ezemvelo KZN Wildlife, and iSimangaliso Wetland Park Authority (IWPA) .

South African coastal MPA's are usually attached to a terrestrial national park or nature reserve, and the management of that park or reserve also manages the MPA, funded by the national government via the Department of Environmental Affairs (DEA), now the Department of Environment, Forestry and Fisheries.

Management strategies for the MPAs include sanctuary, restricted, wilderness and controlled zones, completely no-take MPAs, Ramsar sites, a World Heritage Site, two UNESCO Biosphere Reserves, and the Walker Bay Whale Sanctuary, which is seasonal, effectively an MPA only between 1 July and 30 November of each year.

== Zonation ==
Zonation of marine protected areas in South Africa is classified by the Marine Living Resources Act and the National Environmental Management Act. An MPA may be divided into one or more types of zonation. Restricted and controlled areas are common.

Sanctuary area
Part of a marine protected area where no fishing or any other activity contemplated in terms of section 48A(1) of the National Environmental Management: Protected Areas Act, No. 57 of 2003 may take place, except for scientific research purposes. This prohibits fishing, collection or destruction of any fauna or flora, dredging or extraction of mineral materials, discharging or depositing any waste or pollutants, disturbing, altering or damaging the natural environment or water quality, removing seawater, conducting any activity which may adversely affect the ecosystem, constructing any building or other structure, marine aquaculture, bio-prospecting, sinking any platform, vessel or structure, prospecting for or extracting fossil fuels.
Restricted area
Also known as a no-take zone, is a part of a marine protected area where extraction and harvesting of any marine life is prohibited.
Wilderness area
Part of a marine protected area where no fishing may take place, but ecotourism activities that do not affect wilderness characteristics and attributes may be authorised.
Controlled area
Also known an open area, is a part of an MPA where extraction and harvesting of marine life is allowed but restricted to specific activities, species, and catch limits, and other commercial activities, subject to a specific permit, basically a form of taxation, issued for that activity for a specified time period, usually a year. These activities include spearfishing (on breathhold), angling, recreational scuba diving, snorkelling for mollusc extraction, boating, commercial diving, salvage operations, commercial fishing, whale watching, shark cage diving or filming.

== List of MPAs ==
The listed MPAs were individually proclaimed. Some were later consolidated with adjacent MPAs and may not still be generally referred to by the original name.

- Addo Elephant National Park Marine Protected Area – Marine conservation area in South Africa (Nelson Mandela Bay, Port Elizabeth, Eastern Cape, 2019)
  - Bird Island Marine Protected Area – Marine conservation area in the Eastern Cape in South Africa (Eastern Cape, 2004)
- Agulhas Bank Complex Marine Protected Area – Offshore marine conservation area south of Cape Agulhas in South Africa (South of Cape Agulhas, Western Cape, 2019)
- Agulhas Front Marine Protected Area – Offshore marine conservation area off the Eastern Cape in South Africa's EEZ (South of Port Elizabeth, Eastern Cape, 2019)
- Agulhas Muds Marine Protected Area – Marine conservation area offshore of the Western Cape in South Africa (South of Cape Agulhas, Western Cape. 2019)
- Aliwal Shoal Marine Protected Area – Marine conservation area at Aliwal Shoal off the coast of KwaZulu-Natal, South Africa (KwaZulu-Natal, 2004)
  - Aliwal Shoal Offshore Marine Protected Area – 2019 extension to the Aliwal Shoal Marine Protected Area (South Coast, KwaZulu-Natal, 2019)
- Amathole Marine Protected Area – Marine conservation area in the Eastern Cape in South Africa
- Amathole Offshore Marine Protected Area – Marine conservation area in the Eastern Cape in South Africa (East London, Eastern Cape, 2019)
- Benguela Muds Marine Protected Area – Marine conservation area off the Western Cape province of South Africa (West of Saldanha Bay, Western Cape,2019)
- Betty's Bay Marine Protected Area – Marine conservation area in the Western Cape in South Africa (Western Cape, 2000)
- Browns Bank Corals Marine Protected Area – Marine conservation area on the continental slope of South Africa (South of Cape Town, Western Cape, 2019)(
- Cape Canyon Marine Protected Area – Marine conservation area off the coast of South Africa (West of Cape Columbine, Western Cape, 2019)
- Childs Bank Marine Protected Area – Marine conservation area off the west coast of South Africa (West of Namaqualand, Western Cape, 2019)
- De Hoop Marine Protected Area – Marine conservation area on the coast of South Africa (Western Cape, 2000)
- Dwesa-Cwebe Marine Protected Area – Coastal marine conservation area in the Eastern Cape, South Africa (Eastern Cape, 2000)
- Goukamma Marine Protected Area – Marine conservation area the Western Cape in South Africa (Western Cape, 2000)
- Helderberg Marine Protected Area – Marine conservation area in the Western Cape in South Africa (Western Cape, 2000)
- Hluleka Marine Protected Area – Marine conservation area in the Eastern Cape in South Africa (Eastern Cape, 2000)
- iSimangaliso Marine Protected Area – Marine conservation area in northern kwaZulu-Natal in South Africa (KwaZulu-Natal)
  - iSimangaliso Offshore Marine Protected Area – Large 2019 extension to the iSimangaliso marine protected area (North Coast, KwaZulu-Natal, 2019)
  - Maputaland Marine Protected Area – Marine conservation area in northern kwaZulu-Natal in South Africa (KwaZulu-Natal, 2000)
- Jutten Island Marine Protected Area – Marine conservation area in Saldanha Bay in South Africa (Western Cape, 2000)
- Langebaan Lagoon Marine Protected Area – Marine conservation area in South Africa (Western Cape, 2000)
- Malgas Island Marine Protected Area – Marine conservation area on the west coast in the Western Cape province in South Africa (Western Cape, 2000)
- Marcus Island Marine Protected Area – Marine conservation area in the Western Cape in South Africa (Western Cape)
- Namaqua Fossil Forest Marine Protected Area – Marine conservation area off South Africa (Off Kleinzee, Namaqualand, Northern Cape, 2019)
- Namaqua National Park Marine Protected Area – Marine conservation area in Namaqualand in the Northern Cape, in South Africa (Off Namaqualand, Northern Cape, 2019)
- Orange Shelf Edge Marine Protected Area – Marine conservation area off the Northern Cape in South Africa (Off Port Nolloth, Northern Cape, 2019)
- Pondoland Marine Protected Area – Marine conservation area in the Eastern Cape province of South Africa (Eastern Cape, 2004)
- Port Elizabeth Corals Marine Protected Area – Marine conservation area off the Eastern Cape in South Africa (Offshore of Port Elizabeth, Eastern Cape, 2019)
- Prince Edward Islands Marine Protected Area – Indian Ocean region in South Africa's EEZ (Southern Ocean, 2013)
- Protea Banks Marine Protected Area – Marine conservation area in KwaZulu-Natal, South Africa (South Coast, KwaZulu-Natal, 2019)
- Robben Island Marine Protected Area – Marine conservation area in South Africa (Cape Town, Western Cape, 2019)
- Rocherpan Marine Protected Area – Marine conservation area on the west coast of the Western Cape in South Africa (Western Cape, north of Saldanha Bay)
- Robberg Marine Protected Area – Coastal conservation area in the Western Cape of South Africa (Western Cape, 2000)
- Sardinia Bay Marine Protected Area – Marine conservation area in the Eastern Cape in South Africa (Eastern Cape, 2000)
- Sixteen Mile Beach Marine Protected Area – Marine conservation area the Western Cape in South Africa (Western Cape, 2000)
- Southeast Atlantic Seamounts Marine Protected Area – Marine conservation area in the South Atlantic in the South African EEZ(South of Knysna, Western Cape, 2019)
- Southwest Indian Seamount Marine Protected Area – Marine conservation area south of Stilbaai in the Western Cape in South Africa (South of Port Elizabeth, Eastern Cape, 2019)
- Stilbaai Marine Protected Area – Marine conservation area in the Western Cape in South Africa (Western Cape, 2008)
- Table Mountain National Park Marine Protected Area – Marine conservation area around the Cape Peninsula in South Africa (Western Cape, 2004)
  - Castle Rock Marine Protected Area, previously known as the Millers Point Marine Reserve, now part of Table Mountain National Park Marine Protected Area (Western Cape, 2000)
- Trafalgar Marine Protected Area – Marine conservation area (in region) in South Africa (Eastern Cape, 2000)
- Tsitsikamma Marine Protected Area – Marine conservation area on the south coast of South Africa (Eastern Cape, 2000)
- uThukela Banks Marine Protected Area – Marine conservation area off the coast of kwaZulu-Natal in South Africa (KwaZulu-Natal, 2019)
- Walker Bay Whale Sanctuary – Marine conservation area in the Western Cape province in South Africa (Western Cape, 2001, seasonal)

=== Proposed ===
- Benguela Bank Marine Protected Area – Marine conservation area off the west coast of South Africa (West of Doringbaai, Western Cape) (proposed?)
- Browns Bank Complex Marine Protected Area – Marine conservation area south of the Western Cape in South Africa (South of Struisbaai, Western Cape) (proposed?)

== Protection ==
The 2019 proclamation of 20 new marine protected areas extended protection for the first time to 51 previously unprotected ecosystem types. This reduced the number of unprotected ecosystem types from 47% to 13%. The quality of protection is variable. Insufficient area of some ecosystems is protected. In other cases legal and illegal fishing, waste water discharge and other pressures degrade the protection. Improvements in governance are urgently needed, including developing and implementing management plans, better financing, and improving liaison end compliance.

== Threats ==
- Illegal and unregulated fishing. Illegal fishing in South African waters has generally been assumed to be the illegal harvesting of abalone, but IUU fishing has been estimated to cost the South African economy as much as R60 billion per year. In May 2016, three Chinese skippers were charged with fishing without the required permits in South African waters, and having illegally taken R70,000,000 worth of squid, and an earlier case of illegal harvesting of rock lobster over 14 years was litigated in 2013 and resulted in a US$22.5 million reparations payment to South Africa. This is a considerable loss of income and employment opportunities for South Africa.
- Inadequate enforcement/security. Security and enforcement capabilities are necessary for implementing Sustainable Development Goal 14 – to conserve and sustainably use the oceans, seas and marine resources, for preventing pollution, combating overfishing and IUU fishing, for the conservation of certain coastal and marine areas, and for increasing the economic benefits accrued through the sustainable use of marine resources.
- Political pressure and corruption
- Climate change
- Pollution
