= Southwest Indian Seamount Marine Protected Area =

Marine conservation area south of Stilbaai in the Western Cape in South Africa

- Southwest Indian Seamount MPA location
- Location: South of the continental shelf of South Africa
- Nearest city: Stilbaai
- Coordinates: 36°46′S 22°40′E
- Area: 7,500 km^{2} (2,900 sq mi)
- Established: 2019

The Southwest Indian Seamount Marine Protected Area is an offshore conservation region in the exclusive economic zone of South Africa.

== History ==
Fossilised bones from extinct whale species have been recovered from the terraced continental slope from depths beyond 900 m (3,000 ft) in this area.

== Purpose ==
A marine protected area is defined by the IUCN as "A clearly defined geographical space, recognised, dedicated and managed, through legal or other effective means, to achieve the long-term conservation of nature with associated ecosystem services and cultural values".

This MPA is specifically intended to protect rocky shelf edge, seamount and associated deep sea biodiversity and ecosystems. It is split to allow petroleum exploration in areas between those of more ecologically important areas, which include untrawled rocky shelf edge with coral gardens in the shallower 200 to 300 m (980 ft) depths and reef-building cold-water corals in the 900 to 1,200 m (3,000 to 3,900 ft) depth range. The deeper areas protect continental slope and abyssal habitats in the 3,800 to 4,200 m (12,500 to 13,800 ft) depth range, and a seamount.

== Extent ==
This offshore MPA is in the 1,200 to 500 m (3,900 to 1,600 ft) depth range about 93 nautical miles south of Stilbaai in the Western Cape. The MPA protects the water column, the seabed and the subsoil within the boundaries. The area of ocean protected is 7,500 km^{2} (2,900 sq mi).

=== Boundaries ===
The MPA comprises three separate areas:

Restricted area 1 has boundaries:

- Northern boundary: S35°53’, E21°40’ to S35°53’, E22°37’
- Eastern boundary: S35°53’, E22°37’ to S36°22’, E22°37’
- Southern boundary: S36°22’, E22°37’ to S36°22’, E21°40’
- Western boundary: S36°22’, E21°40’ to S35°53’, E21°40’

Controlled area 2 has boundaries:

- Northern boundary: S36°10’, E23°14’ to S36°10’, E23°40’
- Eastern boundary: S36°10’, E23°40’ to S36°35’, E23°14’
- Southern boundary: S36°35’, E23°14’ to S36°35’, E23°14’
- Western boundary: S36°35’, E23°14’ to S36°10’, E23°14’

Restricted area 3 has boundaries:

- Northern boundary: S37°10’, E22°0’ to S37°10’, E22°35’
- Eastern boundary: S37°10’, E22°35’ to S37°40’, E22°35’
- Southern boundary: S37°40’, E22°35’ to S37°45’, E22°0’
- Western boundary: S37°45’, E22°0’ to S37°10’, E22°0’

=== Zonation ===
The two western component areas are zoned as restricted areas, and the eastern is a controlled area.

== Management ==
The marine protected areas of South Africa are the responsibility of the national government, which has management agreements with a variety of MPA management authorities, which manage the MPAs with funding from the SA Government through the Department of Environmental Affairs (DEA).

The Department of Agriculture, Forestry and Fisheries is responsible for issuing permits, quotas and law enforcement.

== Ecology ==
Marine ecoregions of the South African Exclusive Economic Zone: Southwest Indian Seamounts Marine Protected Area is in the Southwest Indian ecoregion

The MPA is in the warm temperate Southwest Indian ecoregion to the east of Cape Point which extends eastwards to the border of Mozambique. There are some species endemic to South Africa in this region.

Three major habitats exist in the sea in this region, two of them distinguished by the nature of the substrate. The substrate, or base material, is important in that it provides a base to which an organism can anchor itself, which is vitally important for those organisms which need to stay in one particular kind of place. Rocky shores and reefs provide a firm fixed substrate for the attachment of plants and animals. Sandy beaches and bottoms are a relatively unstable substrate and cannot anchor many of the larger benthic organisms. Finally there is open water, above the substrate and clear of the kelp forest, where the organisms must drift or swim. Mixed habitats are also frequently found, which are a combination of those mentioned above.

Rocky shores and reefs There are rocky reefs and mixed rocky and sandy bottoms. For many marine organisms the substrate is another type of marine organism, and it is common for several layers to co-exist.

The type of rock of the reef is of some importance, as it influences the range of possibilities for the local topography, which in turn influences the range of habitats provided, and therefore the diversity of inhabitants. Sandstone and other sedimentary rocks erode and weather very differently, and depending on the direction of dip and strike, and steepness of the dip, may produce reefs which are relatively flat to very high profile and full of small crevices. These features may be at varying angles to the shoreline and wave fronts. There are fewer large holes, tunnels and crevices in sandstone reefs, but often many deep but low near-horizontal crevices.

Sedimentary bottoms (including silt, mud, sand, shelly, pebble and gravel bottoms) Sediment bottoms at first glance appear to be fairly barren areas, as they lack the stability to support many of the spectacular reef based species, and the variety of large organisms is relatively low. The sediment may be moved around by water action, to a greater or lesser degree depending on weather conditions and exposure of the area. This means that sessile organisms must be specifically adapted to areas of relatively loose substrate to thrive in them, and the variety of species found on a sediment bottom will depend on all these factors. Unconsolidated sediment bottoms have one important compensation for their instability, animals can burrow into the sand and move up and down within its layers, which can provide feeding opportunities and protection from predation. Other species can dig themselves holes in which to shelter, or may feed by filtering water drawn through the tunnel, or by extending body parts adapted to this function into the water above the sand.

The open sea The pelagic water column is the major part of the living space at sea. This is the water between the surface and the top of the benthic zone, where living organisms swim, float or drift, and the food chain starts with phytoplankton, the mostly microscopic photosynthetic organisms that convert the energy of sunlight into organic material which feeds nearly everything else, directly or indirectly. In temperate seas there are distinct seasonal cycles of phytoplankton growth, based on the available nutrients and the available sunlight. Either can be a limiting factor. Phytoplankton tend to thrive where there is plenty of light, and they themselves are a major factor in restricting light penetration to greater depths, so the photosynthetic zone tends to be shallower in areas of high productivity. Zooplankton feed on the phytoplankton, and are in turn eaten by larger animals. The larger pelagic animals are generally faster moving and more mobile, giving them the option of changing depth to feed or to avoid predation, and to move to other places in search of a better food supply.

=== Marine species diversity ===
This MPA protects deep-water coral and seamount habitats. The MPA is part of the nursery area for mako sharks and foraging areas for endangered albatross species.

==== Animals ====
Birds:

- Diomedea amsterdamensis (Amsterdam albatross)
- Thalassarche chlororhynchos (Atlantic yellow-nosed albatross)
- Thalassarche melanophris (Black-browed albatross)
- Thalassarche carteri (Indian yellow-nosed albatross)
- Phoebetria fusca (Sooty albatross)
- Diomedea dabbenena (Tristan albatross)

Fish:

- Isurus (mako shark)

==== Endemism ====
The MPA is in the superficially warm temperate Southwest Indian ecoregion to the east of Cape Agulhas which extends to the Mozambique border. There are some species endemic to South Africa in this region.

== See also ==
Marine protected areas of South Africa

- List of protected areas of South Africa
- Marine protected areas of South Africa – Protected areas of coastline or ocean in the EEZ of South Africa
