= Southeast Atlantic Seamounts Marine Protected Area =

Marine conservation area in the South Atlantic in the South African EEZ

- Southeast Atlantic Seamounts MPA location
- Location: Exclusive economic zone of South Africa
- Nearest city: Gansbaai
- Coordinates: 37°00′S 18°30′E
- Area: 6,000 km^{2} (2,300 sq mi)
- Established: 2019

The Southeast Atlantic Seamounts Marine Protected Area is an offshore conservation region in the exclusive economic zone of South Africa

== Purpose ==
A marine protected area is defined by the IUCN as "A clearly defined geographical space, recognised, dedicated and managed, through legal or other effective means, to achieve the long-term conservation of nature with associated ecosystem services and cultural values".

== Extent ==
The Southeast Atlantic Seamount Marine Protected Area is an offshore marine protected area in the 2,000 to 4,000 m (6,600 to 13,100 ft) depth range, about 94 nautical miles southwest of Gansbaai in the Western Cape. The protected area of 6,000 km^{2} (2,300 sq mi) includes the sea bed, water column and subsoil.

=== Boundaries ===
The MPA comprises two separate areas

A larger portion bounded by:

- Northern boundary: S35°53’, E17°55’ to S35°53’, E18°18’
- Eastern boundary: S35°53’, E18°18’ to S37°43’, E18°18’
- Southern boundary: S37°43’, E18°18’ to S37°43’, E17°55’
- Western boundary: S37°43’, E17°55’ to S35°53’, E17°55’

A smaller portion bounded by:

- Northern boundary: S36°20’, E18°50’ to S36°20’, E19°20’
- Eastern boundary: S36°20’, E19°20’ to S36°40’, E19°20’
- Southern boundary: S36°40’, E19°20’ to S36°40’, E18°50’
- Western boundary: S36°40’, E18°50’ to S36°20’, E18°50’

=== Zonation ===
The MPA consists of two restricted zones and one controlled zone.

==== Restricted areas ====
Southeast Atlantic Seamount Restricted Zone 1:

- Northern boundary: S37°3.30’, E17°55’ to S37°3.30’, E18°18’
- Eastern boundary: S37°3.30’, E18°18’ to S37°43’, E18°18’
- Southern boundary: S37°43’, E18°18’ to S37°43’, E17°55’
- Western boundary: S37°43’, E17°55’ to S37°3.30’, E17°55’

Southeast Atlantic Seamount Restricted Zone 2:

- Northern boundary: S36°20’, E18°50’ to S36°20’, E19°20’
- Eastern boundary: S36°20’, E19°20’ to S36°40’, E19°20’
- Southern boundary: S36°40’, E19°20’ to S36°40’, E18°50’
- Western boundary: S36°40’, E18°50’ to S36°20’, E18°50’

==== Controlled areas ====
Southeast Atlantic Seamount Controlled Zone:

- Northern boundary: S35°53’, E17°55’ to S35°53’, E18°18’
- Eastern boundary: S35°53’, E18°18’ to S37°3.30’, E17°55’
- Southern boundary: S37°3.30’, E17°55’ to S37°3.30’, E18°18’
- Western boundary: S37°3.30’, E18°18’ to S35°53’, E17°55’

== Management ==
The marine protected areas of South Africa are the responsibility of the national government, which has management agreements with a variety of MPA management authorities, which manage the MPAs with funding from the SA Government through the Department of Environmental Affairs (DEA).

The Department of Agriculture, Forestry and Fisheries is responsible for issuing permits, quotas and law enforcement.

== Ecology ==
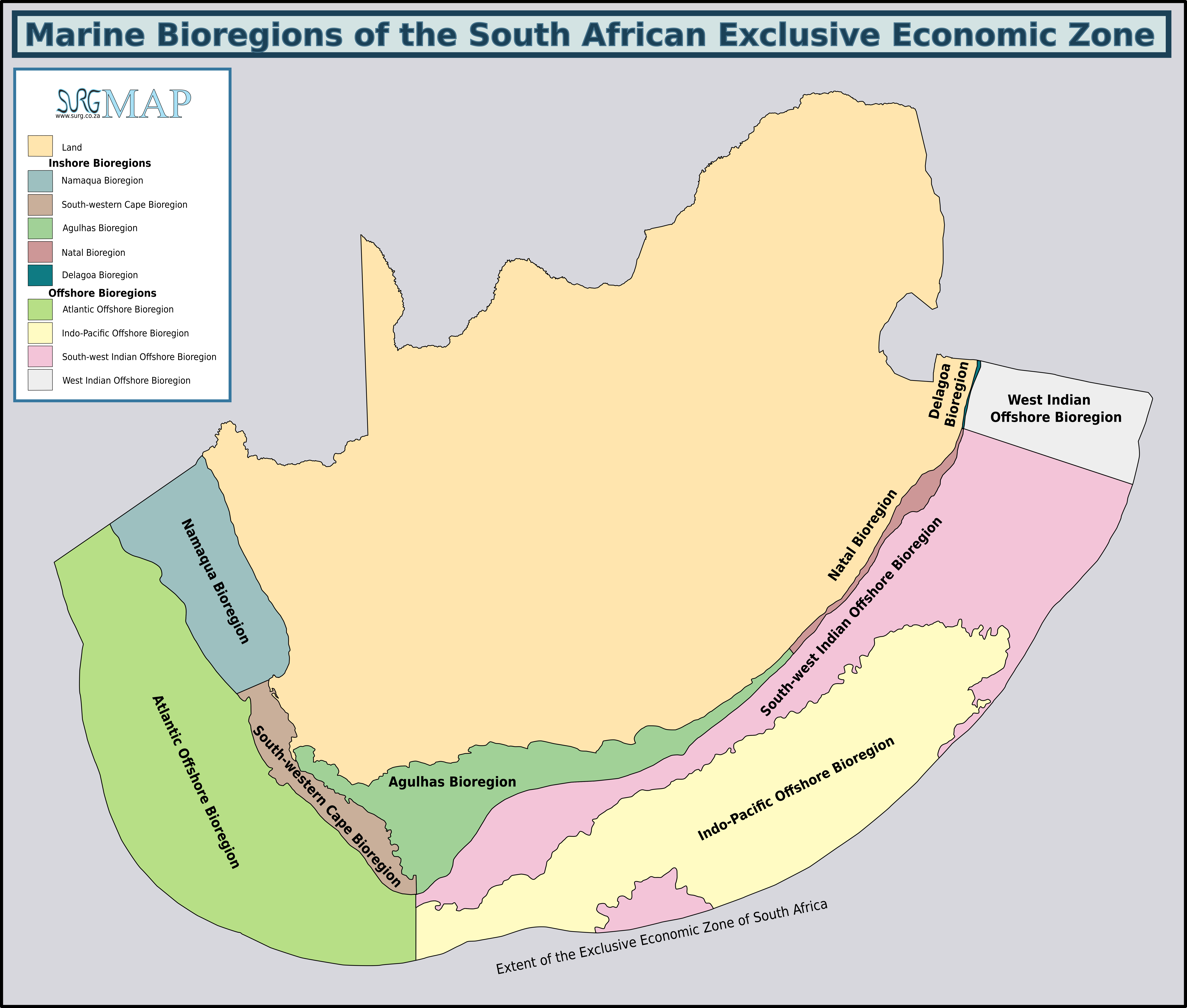
Marine bioregions of the South African Exclusive Economic Zone: (????) Marine Protected Area is in the ???? bioregion.

(describe position, biodiversity and endemism of the region) The MPA is in the warm temperate Agulhas inshore marine bioregion to the east of Cape Point which extends eastwards to the Mbashe River. There are a large proportion of species endemic to South Africa along this coastline.

(check below for applicability) Three major habitats exist in the sea in this region, distinguished by the nature of the substrate. The substrate, or base material, is important in that it provides a base to which an organism can anchor itself, which is vitally important for those organisms which need to stay in one particular kind of place. Rocky reefs provide a firm fixed substrate for the attachment of plants and animals. Sedimentary bottoms are a relatively unstable substrate and cannot anchor kelp or many of the other benthic organisms. Finally there is open water, above the substrate and clear of the kelp forest, where the organisms must drift or swim. Mixed habitats are also frequently found, which are a combination of those mentioned above.

Rocky reefs There are rocky reefs and mixed rocky and sandy bottoms. For many marine organisms the substrate is another type of marine organism, and it is common for several layers to co-exist. Examples of this are red bait pods, which are usually encrusted with sponges, ascidians, bryozoans, anemones, and gastropods, and abalone, which are usually covered by similar seaweeds to those found on the surrounding rocks, usually with a variety of other organisms living on the seaweeds.

The type of rock of the reef is of some importance, as it influences the range of possibilities for the local topography, which in turn influences the range of habitats provided, and therefore the diversity of inhabitants. Sandstone and other sedimentary rocks erode and weather very differently, and depending on the direction of dip and strike, and steepness of the dip, may produce reefs which are relatively flat to very high profile and full of small crevices. These features may be at varying angles to the shoreline and wave fronts. There are fewer large holes, tunnels and crevices in sandstone reefs, but often many deep but low near-horizontal crevices.

Sedimentary bottoms (including silt, mud, sand, shelly, pebble and gravel bottoms) Sedimentary bottoms at first glance appear to be fairly barren areas, as they lack the stability to support many of the spectacular reef based species, and the variety of large organisms is relatively low. This means that sessile organisms must be specifically adapted to areas of relatively loose substrate to thrive in them, and the variety of species found on an unconsolidated sedimentary bottom will depend on all these factors. Sedimentary bottoms have one important compensation for their instability, animals can burrow into the sand and move up and down within its layers, which can provide feeding opportunities and protection from predation. Other species can dig themselves holes in which to shelter, or may feed by filtering water drawn through the tunnel, or by extending body parts adapted to this function into the water above the sediment.

The open sea

== See also ==
Marine protected areas of South Africa

- List of protected areas of South Africa
- Marine protected areas of South Africa – Protected areas of coastline or ocean in the EEZ of South Africa
