= Agulhas Muds Marine Protected Area =

Marine conservation area offshore of the Western Cape in South Africa

- Agulhas Muds MPA location
- Location: East of Cape Agulhas, South Africa
- Nearest city: Bredasdorp
- Coordinates: 34°53.5′S 20°35′E
- Area: 207 km^{2} (80 sq mi)
- Established: 2019
- Agulhas Muds Marine Protected Area (South Africa)

The Agulhas Muds Marine Protected Area (or Agulhas Muds MPA) is an offshore conservation Marine Protected Area region in the exclusive economic zone of South Africa.

== History ==
The history of the Agulhas Muds MPA began when the 2011 National Biodiversity Assessment noted that offshore marine ecosystems were "poorly protected" and started the Offshore Marine Project(2006–2011) which "initiated plans to increase protection of offshore ecosystems". It was then advanced to implementation during Operation Phakisa Oceans Economy. A total of 22 MPAs were gazeted for comment in 2016 as part of a "lengthy" consultation process. In October 2018 the South African Cabinet granted permission for 20 new revised networks. It took several months to prepare the declaration notices and other legal papers. It "culminated in the gazetting of 20 new MPAs on 23 May 2019" which would take effect in August 2019 and expand the protection of South Africa's mainland ocean territory to 5%.

== Purpose ==
A marine protected area is defined by the IUCN as "A clearly defined geographical space, recognised, dedicated and managed, through legal or other effective means, to achieve the long-term conservation of nature with associated ecosystem services and cultural values".

The MPA is intended to protect critically endangered shallow mud habitats between 80 and 100 m deep.

== Extent ==
The MPA is offshore in the 80 to 100 m depth range about 22 nautical miles east of Cape Agulhas.

Area of protected ocean is 207 km^{2}

=== Boundaries ===
The boundaries of the MPA are:

- Northern boundary: A S34°50′ E20°30′ to B S34°50′ E20°40′
- Eastern boundary: B S34°50′ E20°40′ to C S34°57′ E20°40′
- Southern boundary: C S34°57′ E20°40′ to D S34°57′ E20°30′
- Western boundary: D S34°57′ E20°30′ to A S34°50′ E20°30′

=== Zonation ===
The whole MPA is zoned as a single controlled area.

== Management ==
The marine protected areas of South Africa are the responsibility of the national government, which has management agreements with a variety of MPA management authorities, which manage the MPAs with funding from the SA Government through the Department of Environmental Affairs (DEA).

The Department of Agriculture, Forestry and Fisheries is responsible for issuing permits, quotas and law enforcement.

== Ecology ==
Marine ecoregions of the South African Exclusive Economic Zone: Agulhas Muds Marine Protected Area is in the Agulhas ecoregion

The MPA is in the warm temperate Agulhas ecoregion to the east of Cape Point which extends eastwards to the Mbashe River. There are a large proportion of species endemic to South Africa along this coastline.

=== Sedimentary bottoms ===
(including silt, mud, sand, shelly, pebble and gravel bottoms) Sedimentary bottoms at first glance appear to be fairly barren areas, as they lack the stability to support many of the spectacular reef based species, and the variety of large organisms is relatively low. The sand may be moved around by water movement, to a greater or lesser degree depending on weather conditions and exposure of the area. This means that sessile organisms must be specifically adapted to areas of relatively loose substrate to thrive in them, and the variety of species found on a sandy or gravel bottom will depend on all these factors. unconsolidated sedimentary bottoms have one important compensation for their instability, animals can burrow into the sediment and move up and down within its layers, which can provide feeding opportunities and protection from predation. Other species can dig themselves holes in which to shelter, or may feed by filtering water drawn through the tunnel, or by extending body parts adapted to this function into the water above the sand.

=== The open sea ===
The pelagic water column is the major part of the living space at sea. This is the water between the surface and the top of the benthic zone, where living organisms swim, float or drift, and the food chain starts with phytoplankton, the mostly microscopic photosynthetic organisms that convert the energy of sunlight into organic material which feeds nearly everything else, directly or indirectly. In temperate seas there are distinct seasonal cycles of phytoplankton growth, based on the available nutrients and the available sunlight. Either can be a limiting factor. Phytoplankton tend to thrive where there is plenty of light, and they themselves are a major factor in restricting light penetration to greater depths, so the photosynthetic zone tends to be shallower in areas of high productivity. Zooplankton feed on the phytoplankton, and are in turn eaten by larger animals. The larger pelagic animals are generally faster moving and more mobile, giving them the option of changing depth to feed or to avoid predation, and to move to other places in search of a better food supply.

=== Marine species diversity ===
==== Animals ====
The Agulhas Muds MPA serves as habitat for the Agulhas sole (Austroglossus pectoralis).

==== Endemism ====
The MPA is in the warm temperate Agulhas ecoregion to the east of Cape Point which extends eastwards to the Mbashe River. There are a large proportion of species endemic to South Africa along this coastline.

== See also ==
Marine protected areas of South Africa
- List of protected areas of South Africa
- Marine protected areas of South Africa – Protected areas of coastline or ocean in the EEZ of South Africa
