= Childs Bank Marine Protected Area =

Marine conservation area off the west coast of South Africa

- Childs Bank MPA location
- Location: Off the Northern Cape province, South Africa
- Nearest city: Hondeklipbaai
- Coordinates: 30°50′S 15°52.5′E
- Area: 1,335 km^{2} (515 sq mi)
- Established: 2019
- Governing body: Department of Forestry, Fisheries and the Environment
- Childs Bank Marine Protected Area (South Africa)

The Childs Bank Marine Protected Area is an offshore conservation region in the exclusive economic zone of South Africa. It protects a unique, flat-topped ocean bank, considered to be a probable carbonate mound., and its sensitive habitats, including cold-water corals. It is a critical area for the recovery of nursery grounds for juvenile fish and supports the eco-certification of the South African hake fishery.

== History ==
Childs Bank is named for Captain Childs, who led the research team that discovered this flat-topped, steep-sided seabed feature in the 1970s. Much of the coral on the bank has been damaged by trawling, but some pristine coral gardens remain on the steepest slopes. The area was proposed for protection in 2004, but its size was reduced to avoid mining areas.

== Purpose ==
A marine protected area is defined by the IUCN as "A clearly defined geographical space, recognised, dedicated and managed, through legal or other effective means, to achieve the long-term conservation of nature with associated ecosystem services and cultural values".

The Childs Bank MPA provides critical protection for deep-sea habitats at depths between 180 and 450 m. It allows for the recovery of important nursery areas for juvenile fish and helps maintain the eco-certification of the South African hake fishery by protecting these vital habitats.

== Extent ==
The Childs Bank MPA is off the coast of the Northern Cape in the 180 m to 450 m depth range, about 70 nautical miles west of Hondeklipbaai. The MPA protects the water column, seabed and subsoil inside its boundaries. The area of ocean protected is 1,335 km^{2}. The entire Childs Bank Marine Protected Area is zoned as a single Controlled Zone.

=== Boundaries ===
The MPA boundaries are:

- Northern boundary: A S30°40.000' E15°36.000' to B S30°40.000' E16°0.000'
- Eastern boundary: B S30°40.000' E16°0.000' to C S31°0.000' E16°0.000'
- Southern boundary: C S31°0.000' E16°0.000' to D S31°0.000' E15°45.000'
- Southwestern boundary: D S31°0.000' E15°45.000' to E S30°54.000' E15°36.000'
- Western boundary: E S30°54.000' E15°36.000' to A S30°40.000' E15°36.000'

== Management ==
The marine protected areas of South Africa are the responsibility of the national government, which has management agreements with a variety of MPA management authorities. These authorities manage the MPAs with funding from the SA Government through the Department of Environmental Affairs (DEA). The regulations for the MPA were established under the National Environmental Management: Protected Areas Act, 2003. Scientific research within the protected area is not permitted unless licensed.

The Department of Agriculture, Forestry and Fisheries is responsible for issuing permits, quotas and law enforcement.

== Ecology ==
Marine ecoregions of the South African Exclusive Economic Zone: Childs Bank Marine Protected Area is in the Southeast Atlantic ecoregion

The MPA is in the cool temperate Southeast Atlantic ecoregion to the west of the continental shelf.

Childs Bank and its associated habitats support structurally complex and fragile ecosystems built on cold-water corals, hydrocorals, gorgonians, and glass sponges. These species are particularly vulnerable to physical disturbance and are slow to recover.

=== Fauna ===
The seafloor fauna is diverse, featuring a variety of sea stars, brittle stars, pancake urchins, and large basket stars that extend their branching arms to feed in the currents along the bank's steep walls. The shelf edge adjacent to the bank is a biodiversity hotspot for demersal fish and cephalopods. Benthic samples from near the mound have revealed high abundances of infauna and epifauna, including two species of burrowing urchins (Spatangus capensis and Brissopsis lyrifera capensis) and a burrowing anemone (Actinauge granulosus).

=== Endemism ===
The MPA is in the cool temperate Southeast Atlantic ecoregion, which contains some species endemic to South Africa. The MPA protects the only known South African habitat for the habitat-forming cold-water coral Desmophyllum pertusum.

== See also ==
Marine protected areas of South Africa
- List of protected areas of South Africa
- Marine protected areas of South Africa – Protected areas of coastline or ocean in the EEZ of South Africa
