= UThukela Banks Marine Protected Area =

Marine conservation area off the coast of kwaZulu-Natal in South Africa

uThukela Banks Marine Protected Area
- uThukela Banks MPA location
- Location: kwaZulu-Natal, South Africa
- Nearest city: Zinkwazi Beach
- Coordinates: 29°16.5′S 31°46.5′E
- Area: 5,666 km^{2} (2,188 sq mi)
- Established: 2019
- UThukela Banks Marine Protected Area (South Africa)

The uThukela Banks Marine Protected Area is an inshore and offshore conservation region in the territorial waters and exclusive economic zone of South Africa.

== Purpose ==
A marine protected area is defined by the IUCN as "A clearly defined geographical space, recognised, dedicated and managed, through legal or other effective means, to achieve the long-term conservation of nature with associated ecosystem services and cultural values".

== Extent ==
The MPA is a coastal and offshore area in KwaZulu-Natal between the Mlalazi and Seteni estuaries Area of sea protected by the MPA is about 5666 km^{2}, and the depth range is 0–1000 m.

=== Boundaries ===
The MPA borders are:

- Northern boundary: S28°56’, E31°51’ to S28°56’, E32°15’
- Eastern boundary: S28°56’, E32°15’ to S28°56’, E32°15’
- Southern boundary: S29°37’, E32°15’ to S29°37’, E31°18’
- South-western boundary: S29°37’, E31°18’ to S29°25’, E31°18’
- North-western boundary: S29°25’, E31°18’ back to S28°56’, E31°51’ along the high water mark

=== Zonation ===
The MPA is subdivided into one inshore controlled zone, two offshore controlled zones, two offshore controlled-pelagic zones, two inshore restricted zones and one offshore restricted zone.

==== Restricted areas ====
uThukela Banks inshore restricted zone 1 lies between S29°26.928’, S31°36.945’ and S29°13.472’, E31°31.062’ from the high-water mark to the two metre depth contour.

uThukela Banks inshore restricted zone 2 lies between S29°24.08’, E31°19.7’ and S29°25.992’, E31°18’ between the high-water mark and the two metre depth contour.

uThukela Banks offshore restricted zone is the interior of the polygon that lies between:

- S29°13’, E31°31.162’ to S29°13’, E31°48’
- S29°13’, E31°48’ to S29°20’, E31°48’
- S29°20’, E31°48’ to S29°21’, E31°55.5’
- S29°21’, E31°55.5’ to S29°17.5’, E31°55.5’
- S29°17.5’, E31°55.5’ to S29°17.5’, E31°58.5’
- S29°17.5’, E31°58.5’ to S29°17.5’, E31°58.5’
- S29°21’, E31°58.5’ to S29°21’, E31°58.5’
- S29°20’, E32°15’ to S29°20’, E32°15’
- S29°37’, E32°15’ to S29°37’, E32°15’
- S29°37’, E31°36’ to S29°37’, E31°36’
- S29°22’, E31°36’ to S29°22’, E31°36’
- S29°22’, E31°29’ to S29°22’, E31°29’
- S29°14.791’, E31°29’ back to S29°13’, E31°31.162’ along the 2 m contour of the surf zone.

==== Controlled areas ====
uThukela Banks inshore controlled zones are the remainder of the inshore portion of the MPA

uThukela Banks offshore controlled zone 1 (north) is the interior of the polygon that lies between:

- S28° 56’, E31° 51’ to S28°56’, E32°15’
- S28°56’, E32°15’ to S29°20’, E32°15’
- S29°20’, E32°15’ to S29°21’, E31°58.5’
- S29°21’, E31°58.5’ to S29°17.5’, E31°58.5’
- S29°17.5’, E31°58.5’ to S29°17.5’, E31°55.5’
- S29°17.5’, E31°55.5’ to S29°21’, E31°55.5’
- S29°21’, E31°55.5’ to S29°20’, E31°48’
- S29°20’, E31°48’ to S29°13’, S31°48’
- S29°13’, S31°48’ to S29°13’, S31°31.162’
- S29°13’, S31°31.162’ back to S28° 56’, E31° 51’ along the 2 m depth contour of the surf zone.

uThukela Banks offshore controlled zone 2 (south) is the interior of the polygon that lies between:

- S29°14.761’, E31°29’ to S29°22’, E31°29’
- S29°22’, E31°29’ to S29°22’, E31°36’
- S29°22’, E31°36’ to S29°22’, E31°36’
- S29°37’, E31°36’ to S29°37’, E31°18’
- S29°37’, E31°18’ to S29°25.992’, E31°18’
- S29°25.992’, E31°18’ back to S29°14.761’, E31°29’ along the 2 m depth contour of the surf zone.

uThukela Banks offshore controlled-pelagic zone 1 has boundaries:

- Northern boundary: S28°56.9’, E32°8.4’ to S28°56.9’, E32°10.7’
- Eastern boundary: S28°56.9’, E32°10.7’ to S28°56.9’, E32°10.7’
- Southern boundary: S28°59.2’, E32°10.7’ to S28°59.2’, E32°8.4’
- Western boundary: S28°59.2’, E32°8.4’ back to S28°56.9’, E32°8.4’

uThukela Banks offshore controlled-pelagic zone 2 has boundaries:

- Northern boundary: E29°8.2’, E32°0.7’ to S29°58.2’, E32°3.2’
- Eastern boundary: S29°58.2’, E32°3.2’ to S29°10.7’, E32°3.2’
- Southern boundary: S29°10.7’, E32°3.2’ to S29°10.7’, E32°0.7’
- Western boundary: S29°10.7’, E32°0.7’ back to E29°8.2’, E32°0.7’

== Management ==
The marine protected areas of South Africa are the responsibility of the national government, which has management agreements with a variety of MPA management authorities, in this case, ???? , which manages the MPA with funding from the SA Government through the Department of Environmental Affairs (DEA).

The Department of Agriculture, Forestry and Fisheries is responsible for issuing permits, quotas and law enforcement.

== Ecology ==
Marine ecoregions of the South African Exclusive Economic Zone: uThukela Banks Marine Protected Area is in the ???? ecoregion

The MPA is in the warm temperate Agulhas inshore marine bioregion to the east of Cape Point which extends eastwards to the Mbashe River. There are a moderate proportion of species endemic to South Africa along this coastline.

Three major habitats exist in the sea in this region, two of them distinguished by the nature of the substrate. The substrate, or base material, is important in that it provides a base to which an organism can anchor itself, which is vitally important for those organisms which need to stay in one particular kind of place. Rocky shores and reefs provide a firm fixed substrate for the attachment of plants and animals. Sandy beaches and sedimentary bottoms are a relatively unstable substrate and cannot anchor many of the larger benthic organisms. Finally there is open water, above the substrate and clear of the kelp forest, where the organisms must drift or swim. Mixed habitats are also frequently found, which are a combination of those mentioned above.

Rocky reefs There are rocky reefs and mixed rocky and sandy bottoms. For many marine organisms the substrate is another type of marine organism, and it is common for several layers to co-exist.

The type of rock of the reef is of some importance, as it influences the range of possibilities for the local topography, which in turn influences the range of habitats provided, and therefore the diversity of inhabitants. Sandstone and other sedimentary rocks erode and weather very differently, and depending on the direction of dip and strike, and steepness of the dip, may produce reefs which are relatively flat to very high profile and full of small crevices. These features may be at varying angles to the shoreline and wave fronts. There are fewer large holes, tunnels and crevices in sandstone reefs, but often many deep but low near-horizontal crevices.

Sedimentary bottoms (including silt, mud, sand, shelly, pebble and gravel bottoms) Sediment bottoms at first glance appear to be fairly barren areas, as they lack the stability to support many of the spectacular reef based species, and the variety of large organisms is relatively low. The sediment may be moved around by water action, to a greater or lesser degree depending on weather conditions and exposure of the area. This means that sessile organisms must be specifically adapted to areas of relatively loose substrate to thrive in them, and the variety of species found on a sediment bottom will depend on all these factors. Unconsolidated sediment bottoms have one important compensation for their instability, animals can burrow into the sand and move up and down within its layers, which can provide feeding opportunities and protection from predation. Other species can dig themselves holes in which to shelter, or may feed by filtering water drawn through the tunnel, or by extending body parts adapted to this function into the water above the sand.

The open sea The pelagic water column is the major part of the living space at sea. This is the water between the surface and the top of the benthic zone, where living organisms swim, float or drift, and the food chain starts with phytoplankton, the mostly microscopic photosynthetic organisms that convert the energy of sunlight into organic material which feeds nearly everything else, directly or indirectly. In temperate seas there are distinct seasonal cycles of phytoplankton growth, based on the available nutrients and the available sunlight. Either can be a limiting factor. Phytoplankton tend to thrive where there is plenty of light, and they themselves are a major factor in restricting light penetration to greater depths, so the photosynthetic zone tends to be shallower in areas of high productivity. Zooplankton feed on the phytoplankton, and are in turn eaten by larger animals. The larger pelagic animals are generally faster moving and more mobile, giving them the option of changing depth to feed or to avoid predation, and to move to other places in search of a better food supply.

=== Marine species diversity ===
The MPA includes nursery areas and spawning grounds of commercially important fish and shark species.

==== Animals ====
Fish:

- Polysteganus undulosus (seventy four seabream)
- Cymatoceps nasutus (poenskop or black musselcracker)
- Epinephelus marginatus (yellowbelly rockcod)
- Epinephelus andersoni (catface rockcod)
- Hippocampus spp. (seahorses)
- Sphyrna spp. (hammerhead sharks)

Invertebrates:

- Pennatulacea (seapens)
- thistle corals
- Leminda millecra (frilled nudibranch)
- yellow seafans
- black corals

==== Endemism ====
The MPA is in the warm temperate Agulhas ecoregion to the north of the Mbashe River. There are a moderate proportion of species endemic to South Africa in this region.

== See also ==
Marine protected areas of South Africa

- List of protected areas of South Africa
- Marine protected areas of South Africa – Protected areas of coastline or ocean in the EEZ of South Africa
