= Orange Shelf Edge Marine Protected Area =

Marine conservation area off the Northern Cape in South Africa

- Orange Shelf Edge MPA location
- Location: South Africa
- Nearest city: Alexander Bay
- Coordinates: 29°55′S 14°39′E
- Area: 2,000 km^{2} (770 sq mi)
- Established: 2019
- Orange Shelf Edge Marine Protected Area (Africa)

The Orange Shelf Edge Marine Protected Area is an offshore conservation region near the edge of the continental shelf in the exclusive economic zone of South Africa off the north coast of the Northern Cape province.

== History ==
The Marine Protected Area (MPA) protects a section of seabed that according to records has never been trawled.

== Purpose ==
A marine protected area is defined by the IUCN as "A clearly defined geographical space, recognised, dedicated and managed, through legal or other effective means, to achieve the long-term conservation of nature with associated ecosystem services and cultural values".

Due the region not having been affected by fishing, it may allow studying an undisturbed underwater ecosystem and develop sustainable fisheries that maintain ecological balance.

== Extent ==
The MPA is off the Northern Cape in the 250 to 1,500 m (820 to 4,920 ft) depth region of the continental slope, about 95 nautical miles northwest of Port Nolloth, and comprises three separate areas. The protected areas include the water column, sea bed and subsoil inside the boundaries. Two of the areas have their northwestern boundary on the boundary between the EEZ of South Africa and the EEZ of Namibia. The protected area of ocean is about 2,000 km^{2} (770 sq mi).

=== Boundaries ===
Orange Shelf Edge area 1 is bounded by:

- Eastern boundary: A S29°43.56′ E14°51.9′ to B S29°49.98′ E14°51.9′
- Southern boundary: B S29°49.98′ E14°51.9′ to C S29°49.98′ E14°40.98′
- North-western boundary: C S29°49.98′ E14°40.98′ to A S29°43.56′ E14°51.9′

Orange Shelf Edge area 2 is bounded by:

- Northern boundary: A S29°40.000′ E15°0.000′ to B S29°40.000′ E15°10.000′
- Eastern boundary: B S29°40.000′ E15°10.000′ to C S30°10.000′ E15°10.000′
- Southern boundary: C S30°10.000′ E15°10.000′ to D S30°10.000′ E15°0.000′
- Western boundary: D S30°10.000′ E15°0.000′ to D S30°10.000′ E15°0.000′

Orange Shelf Edge area 3 is bounded by:

- Northern boundary: A S30°0.06′ E14°24.18′ to B S30°0.06′ E14°50.1′
- Eastern boundary: B S30°0.06′ E14°50.1′ to C S30°10.02′ E14°50.1′
- Southern boundary: C S30°10.02′ E14°50.1′ to D S30°10.02′ E14°8.22′
- Western boundary: D S30°10.02′ E14°8.22′ to A S30°0.06′ E14°24.18′

=== Zonation ===
The whole of the MPA is zoned as a sanctuary area.

== Management ==
The marine protected areas of South Africa are the responsibility of the national government, which has management agreements with a variety of MPA management authorities.

The Department of Agriculture, Forestry and Fisheries is responsible for issuing permits, quotas and law enforcement.

== Ecology ==
Marine ecoregions of the South African Exclusive Economic Zone: Orange Shelf Edge Marine Protected Area is in the Benguela ecoregion

The MPA is in the cool temperate Benguela ecoregion to the west of Cape Point which extends northwards to the Orange River. There may be species endemic to South Africa in this region.

Three major habitats exist in the sea in this region, two of them distinguished by the nature of the substrate. The substrate, or base material, is important in that it provides a base to which an organism can anchor itself, which is vitally important for those organisms which need to stay in one particular kind of place. Rocky shores and reefs provide a firm fixed substrate for the attachment of plants and animals. Sandy beaches and bottoms are a relatively unstable substrate and cannot anchor kelp or many of the other benthic organisms. Finally there is open water, above the substrate and clear of the kelp forest, where the organisms must drift or swim. Mixed habitats are also frequently found, which are a combination of those mentioned above. There are no significant estuarine habitats in the MPA.

Rocky reefs There are rocky reefs and mixed rocky and sandy bottoms. For many marine organisms the substrate is another type of marine organism, and it is common for several layers to co-exist.

The type of rock of the reef is of some importance, as it influences the range of possibilities for the local topography, which in turn influences the range of habitats provided, and therefore the diversity of inhabitants. Sandstone and other sedimentary rocks erode and weather very differently, and depending on the direction of dip and strike, and steepness of the dip, may produce reefs which are relatively flat to very high profile and full of small crevices. These features may be at varying angles to the shoreline and wave fronts. There are fewer large holes, tunnels and crevices in sandstone reefs, but often many deep but low near-horizontal crevices.

Sedimentary bottoms (including silt, mud, sand, shelly, pebble and gravel bottoms) Sedimentary bottoms at first glance appear to be fairly barren areas, as they lack the stability to support many of the spectacular reef based species, and the variety of large organisms is relatively low. The sediment may be moved around by water action, to a greater or lesser degree depending on weather conditions and exposure of the area. This means that sessile organisms must be specifically adapted to areas of relatively loose substrate to thrive in them, and the variety of species found on a sandy or gravel bottom will depend on all these factors. Unconsolidated sedimentary bottoms have one important compensation for their instability, animals can burrow into the sand and move up and down within its layers, which can provide feeding opportunities and protection from predation. Other species can dig themselves holes in which to shelter, or may feed by filtering water drawn through the tunnel, or by extending body parts adapted to this function into the water above the sand.

The open sea The pelagic water column is the major part of the living space at sea. This is the water between the surface and the top of the benthic zone, where living organisms swim, float or drift, and the food chain starts with phytoplankton, the mostly microscopic photosynthetic organisms that convert the energy of sunlight into organic material which feeds nearly everything else, directly or indirectly. In temperate seas there are distinct seasonal cycles of phytoplankton growth, based on the available nutrients and the available sunlight. Either can be a limiting factor. Phytoplankton tend to thrive where there is plenty of light, and they themselves are a major factor in restricting light penetration to greater depths, so the photosynthetic zone tends to be shallower in areas of high productivity. Zooplankton feed on the phytoplankton, and are in turn eaten by larger animals. The larger pelagic animals are generally faster moving and more mobile, giving them the option of changing depth to feed or to avoid predation, and to move to other places in search of a better food supply.

=== Marine species diversity ===
==== Endemism ====
The MPA is in the cool temperate Benguela ecoregion to the west of Cape Point which extends northwards to the Orange River. There may be some species endemic to South Africa in this region.

== See also ==
Marine protected areas of South Africa

- List of protected areas of South Africa
- Marine protected areas of South Africa – Protected areas of coastline or ocean in the EEZ of South Africa
