= Namaqua National Park Marine Protected Area =

Marine conservation area in Namaqualand in the Northern Cape, in South Africa

- Namaqua National Park MPA location
- Location: Coast of Namaqualand, Northern Cape, South Africa
- Coordinates: 30°41.3′S 17°26.6′E
- Area: 500 km^{2} (190 sq mi)
- Established: 2019
- Governing body: SANParks
- Namaqua National Park Marine Protected Area (South Africa)

The Namaqua National Park Marine Protected Area is an inshore conservation region in Namaqualand at the Northern Cape province along the territorial waters of South Africa. It is closely associated with the Namaqua National Park, with which it has a common border and management.

== Purpose ==
A marine protected area is defined by the IUCN as "a clearly defined geographical space, recognised, dedicated and managed, through legal or other effective means, to achieve the long-term conservation of nature with associated ecosystem services and cultural values".

This MPA is the first protection applied to critically endangered coastal ecosystem types in the Namaqua bioregion. The Northern Cape also benefits from additional ecotourism. Detailed ecosystem mapping and monitoring has been ongoing in this region since 1976 so this area can provide a baseline to understand human impacts of harvesting, mining, introduction of alien species and climate change.

== Extent ==
The MPA is an inshore region in the depth range of 0 to 150 m between the Spoeg River and Island Point, partly adjacent to the Namaqua National Park. The protected area includes the water column, the seabed and the subsoil inside the boundaries. The total area of sea protected is 500 km^{2}

=== Boundaries ===
The MPA boundaries are:

- Northern boundary: S30°27.540’, E17°16.860’ to S30°27.540’, E17°20.8458’
- Northwestern boundary: S30°27.540’, E17°20.8458’ to S30°55.002’, E17°36.420’
- Western boundary: S30°55.002’, E17°36.420’ to S30°55.002’, E17°19.998’
- Southern boundary: S30°55.002’, E17°19.998’ to S30°55.002’, E17°36.420’
- Eastern boundary: S30°55.002’, E17°36.420’ back to S30°27.540’, E17°16.860’ along the high-water mark

=== Zonation ===
The MPA consists of one offshore restricted zone, six inshore controlled zones, and six inshore restricted zones.

==== Restricted areas ====
Namaqua National Park offshore restricted zone boundaries:

- Northern boundary: S30°27.540’, E17°16.860’, 100m to seaward of the high-water mark, north of the Spoeg River, to S30°27.540’, E17°20.8458’
- Northwestern boundary: S30°27.540’, E17°20.8458’ to S30°55.002’, E17°36.420’
- Western boundary: S30°55.002’, E17°36.420’ to S30°55.002’, E17°19.998’
- Southern boundary: S30°55.002’, E17°19.998’ to S30°55.002’, E17°36.420’, 100 m to seaward of the high-water mark at Island point.
- Eastern boundary: S30°55.002’, E17°36.420’ back to S30°27.540’, E17°16.860’ along a line 100 m to seaward of the high-water mark.

Namaqua National Park coastal restricted zones:

- Coastal restricted zone 1, from S30°52.7886’, E17°35.2344’ to S30°49.6188’, E17°33.8454’ between the high-water mark and 100 m to seawards of the high-water mark.
- Coastal restricted zone 2, from S30°49.2918’, E17°33.5016’ to S30°45.7830’, E17°32.0178’ between the high-water mark and 100 m to seawards of the high-water mark.
- Coastal restricted zone 3, from S30°44.0058’, E17°31.3314’ to S30°42.0300’, E17°29.4672’ between the high-water mark and 100 m to seawards of the high-water mark.
- Coastal restricted zone 4, from S30°40.8342’, E17°28.2378’ to S30°33.1404’, E17°24.6900’ between the high-water mark and 100 m to seawards of the high-water mark.
- Coastal restricted zone 5, from S30°30.8784’, E17°23.2404’ to S30°30.0210’, E17°22.5036’ between the high-water mark and 100 m to seawards of the high-water mark.
- Coastal restricted zone 6, from S30°29.7384’, E17°22.1694’ to S30°27.5400’, E17°20.9400’ between the high-water mark and 100 m to seawards of the high-water mark.

==== Controlled areas ====
Namaqua National Park coastal controlled zones:

- Coastal controlled zone 1, from S30°55.0020’, E17°36.4200’ to S30°52.7886’, E17°35.2344’ between the high-water mark and 100 m to seawards of the high-water mark.
- Coastal controlled zone 2, from S30°49.6188’, E17°33.8454’ to S30°49.2918’, E17°33.5016’ between the high-water mark and 100 m to seawards of the high-water mark.
- Coastal controlled zone 3, from S30°45.7830’, E17°32.0178’ to S30°44.0058’, E17°31.3314’ between the high-water mark and 100 m to seawards of the high-water mark.
- Coastal controlled zone 4, from S30°42.0300’, E17°29.4672’ to S30°40.8342’, E17°28.2378’ between the high-water mark and 100 m to seawards of the high-water mark.
- Coastal controlled zone 5, from S30°33.1404’, E17°24.6900’ to S30°30.8784’, E17°23.2404’ between the high-water mark and 100 m to seawards of the high-water mark.
- Coastal controlled zone 6, from S30°30.0210’, E17°22.5036’ to S30°29.7384’, E17°22.1694’ between the high-water mark and 100 m to seawards of the high-water mark.

== Management ==
The marine protected areas of South Africa are the responsibility of the national government, which has management agreements with a variety of MPA management authorities, in this case, SANParks, which manages the MPA with funding from the SA Government through the Department of Environmental Affairs (DEA).

The Department of Agriculture, Forestry and Fisheries is responsible for issuing permits, quotas and law enforcement.

== Ecology ==
Marine ecoregions of the South African Exclusive Economic Zone: Namaqua National Park Marine Protected Area is in the Benguela ecoregion

The MPA is in the warm temperate Bengeula ecoregion to the west of Cape Point which extends northwards to the Orange River. There are a moderately large proportion of species endemic to South Africa along this coastline.

Four major habitats exist in the sea in this region, distinguished by the nature of the substrate. The substrate, or base material, is important in that it provides a base to which an organism can anchor itself, which is vitally important for those organisms which need to stay in one particular kind of place. Rocky shores and reefs provide a firm fixed substrate for the attachment of plants and animals. Some of these may have Kelp forests, which reduce the effect of waves and provide food and shelter for an extended range of organisms. Sandy beaches and bottoms are a relatively unstable substrate and cannot anchor kelp or many of the other benthic organisms. Finally there is open water, above the substrate and clear of the kelp forest, where the organisms must drift or swim. Mixed habitats are also frequently found, which are a combination of those mentioned above. There are no significant estuarine habitats in the MPA.

Rocky shores and reefs There are rocky reefs and mixed rocky and sandy bottoms. For many marine organisms the substrate is another type of marine organism, and it is common for several layers to co-exist. Examples of this are red bait pods, which are usually encrusted with sponges, ascidians, bryozoans, anemones, and gastropods, and abalone, which are usually covered by similar seaweeds to those found on the surrounding rocks, usually with a variety of other organisms living on the seaweeds.

The type of rock of the reef is of some importance, as it influences the range of possibilities for the local topography, which in turn influences the range of habitats provided, and therefore the diversity of inhabitants. Sandstone and other sedimentary rocks erode and weather very differently, and depending on the direction of dip and strike, and steepness of the dip, may produce reefs which are relatively flat to very high profile and full of small crevices. These features may be at varying angles to the shoreline and wave fronts. There are fewer large holes, tunnels and crevices in sandstone reefs, but often many deep but low near-horizontal crevices.

Kelp forests Kelp forests are a variation of rocky reefs, as the kelp requires a fairly strong and stable substrate which can withstand the loads of repeated waves dragging on the kelp plants. The Sea bamboo Ecklonia maxima grows in water which is shallow enough to allow it to reach to the surface with its gas-filled stipes, so that the fronds form a dense layer at or just below the surface, depending on the tide. The shorter Split-fan kelp Laminaria pallida grows mostly on deeper reefs, where there is not so much competition from the sea bamboo. Both these kelp species provide food and shelter for a variety of other organisms, particularly the Sea bamboo, which is a base for a wide range of epiphytes, which in turn provide food and shelter for more organisms.

Sandy beaches and bottoms (including shelly, pebble and gravel bottoms) Sandy bottoms at first glance appear to be fairly barren areas, as they lack the stability to support many of the spectacular reef based species, and the variety of large organisms is relatively low. The sand is continually being moved around by wave action, to a greater or lesser degree depending on weather conditions and exposure of the area. This means that sessile organisms must be specifically adapted to areas of relatively loose substrate to thrive in them, and the variety of species found on a sandy or gravel bottom will depend on all these factors. Sandy bottoms have one important compensation for their instability, animals can burrow into the sand and move up and down within its layers, which can provide feeding opportunities and protection from predation. Other species can dig themselves holes in which to shelter, or may feed by filtering water drawn through the tunnel, or by extending body parts adapted to this function into the water above the sand.

The open sea The pelagic water column is the major part of the living space at sea. This is the water between the surface and the top of the benthic zone, where living organisms swim, float or drift, and the food chain starts with phytoplankton, the mostly microscopic photosynthetic organisms that convert the energy of sunlight into organic material which feeds nearly everything else, directly or indirectly. In temperate seas there are distinct seasonal cycles of phytoplankton growth, based on the available nutrients and the available sunlight. Either can be a limiting factor. Phytoplankton tend to thrive where there is plenty of light, and they themselves are a major factor in restricting light penetration to greater depths, so the photosynthetic zone tends to be shallower in areas of high productivity. Zooplankton feed on the phytoplankton, and are in turn eaten by larger animals. The larger pelagic animals are generally faster moving and more mobile, giving them the option of changing depth to feed or to avoid predation, and to move to other places in search of a better food supply.

=== Marine species diversity ===
==== Animals ====
Fish:

- Merluccius capensis (Cape hake) - nursery area

Invertebrates:

- (mussels)
- Jasus lalandii (west coast rock lobsters)

==== Seaweeds ====
- Laminaria pallida (kelp) forests

==== Endemism ====
The MPA is in the cool temperate Benguela ecoregion to the west of Cape Point which extends northwards to the Orange River. There are a moderately large proportion of species endemic to South Africa along this coastline.

== See also ==
Marine protected areas of South Africa
- List of protected areas of South Africa
- Marine protected areas of South Africa – Protected areas of coastline or ocean in the EEZ of South Africa
