= Addo Elephant National Park Marine Protected Area =

Marine conservation area in South Africa

- Addo Elephant National Park MPA location
- Location: Eastern Cape, South Africa
- Nearest city: Gqeberha
- Coordinates: 33°45′S 26°05′E
- Area: 1,200 km^{2} (460 sq mi)
- Established: 23 May 2019
- Governing body: South African National Parks (SANParks)
- Website: www.sanparks.org/conservation/marine-protected-areas/addo-elephant-national-park-mpa
- Addo Elephant National Park Marine Protected Area (South Africa)

The Addo Elephant National Park Marine Protected Area is a marine conservation area in Algoa Bay, adjacent to the Nelson Mandela Bay Metropolitan Municipality, near Gqeberha, formerly known as Port Elizabeth. It is part of a national network of MPAs that covers 5% of South Africa's exclusive economic zone.

== History ==
The terrestrial section of the Addo Elephant National Park was founded in 1931 to protect the area's last eleven elephants. The park has since become highly successful, housing over 600 elephants and many other mammals. The park's scope was expanded to the marine environment in 2005 when the Bird Island and St. Croix island groups were incorporated into the national park. A formal MPA, the Bird Island Marine Protected Area, was proclaimed in 2004.

On 23 May 2019, the South African government officially proclaimed the new, larger Addo Elephant National Park MPA, which replaced and incorporated the former Bird Island MPA. This was part of a broader national initiative to expand marine protection, known as Operation Phakisa. The planning process included consultation with commercial fishermen, divers, and other members of the public, leading to the creation of a multi-zone protected area.

== Purpose ==
According to the official government proclamation, the Addo MPA was established to achieve several key objectives. These include the protection of the area's unique ecosystem, which links estuaries, the bay, islands, and the continental shelf. A major goal is to support the recovery of commercially important and threatened fish stocks, such as kob, and to protect critical spawning and nursery habitats. The MPA also aims to safeguard the feeding and breeding grounds of endangered seabirds and marine mammals. The area specifically protects spawning habitats for kob and nursery areas for kingklip, and contains significant cold-water coral gardens.

== Extent ==
The MPA extends 80 km (50 mi) eastward from the Coega harbour, covering an area of 1,200 km^{2} (460 sq mi). It includes the estuary of the Sundays River from S33°37.665', E025°44.082' to the river's mouth. The MPA comprises the seabed, the water column, and the surface.

=== Zonation ===
The Addo MPA is divided into a mix of restricted and controlled zones, each with specific regulations. The precise boundaries for these zones are legally defined in the government gazette.

==== Restricted zones ====
Restricted zones are 'no-take' areas where activities like fishing are prohibited. Anchoring is also not allowed without permission. These include:

- Bird Island Offshore Restricted Zone: Protects the waters around the Bird Island group.
- St. Croix Island Offshore Restricted Zone: Protects the waters around the St. Croix Island group.
- Sundays River Estuary Restricted Zones: Includes zones at the estuary mouth and further upstream near the "Koppies".
- Sundays Inshore Restricted Zone: A section of coastline between the Sundays and Woody Cape areas.
Full Boundary Coordinates (WGS-84)
- The legal boundaries are defined in Government Notice R.777 of 23 May 2019.
  - Bird Island offshore restricted zone lies between S33°52.500', E026°10.000' and S33°52.500', E026°29.350' in the south, and extends northwards to the high-water mark, including a 200m seaward buffer.
  - St. Croix Island offshore restricted zone is bounded by S33°52.500', E025°42.000' and S33°52.500', E025°51.607' in the south, extending northwards to the coast with a 200m seaward buffer around the islands.
  - Sundays inshore restricted zone runs along the coast between longitudes E025°57.35' and E026°10.000'.
  - Sunday's River estuary mouth restricted zone is a small rectangular area defined by coordinates around the mouth of the river.
  - Sunday's River estuary restricted zone covers the area from the "Koppies" at S33°41.029', E025°46.248' to S33°37.665', E025°44.082'.

==== Controlled zones ====
In controlled zones, specific activities such as recreational fishing and motor boating are allowed with a permit. These zones include:

- Cannon Rocks Zone: Located at the eastern end of the MPA.
- Cape Padrone Zone: An inshore area near Woody Cape.
- Sundays Inshore and Offshore Zones: Large areas designated for multiple uses.
- Sundays River Estuary Zone: The main body of the estuary.
- Algoa Bay Sustainable Aquaculture Zone: A specific area demarcated for fish farming.

== Management ==
The Addo Elephant National Park MPA is managed by South African National Parks (SANParks), which receives dedicated funding from the national treasury for its management and enforcement activities, including vessel patrols. The Department of Agriculture, Forestry and Fisheries is responsible for issuing fishing permits and quotas.

Permits for activities within the MPA can be obtained from the Matyholweni Rest Camp. SANParks operates a 24-hour hotline (+27 81 834 3315) for the public to report any infringements of the MPA regulations.

== Use ==
The MPA supports a variety of economic and recreational activities. Tourism is a significant contributor, with a 2024 report estimating the value of penguin viewing in Algoa Bay at ZAR 179 million per year. Activities include:

- Whale and dolphin watching ecotourism.
- Scuba diving (permit required in specified zones).
- Recreational angling (permit required in specified zones).
- Waterskiing and recreational boating in the estuary.

=== Activities requiring a permit ===
A permit issued by SANParks is required for:

- Scientific research and monitoring
- White shark cage-diving
- Salvage operations
- Underwater photography

=== Scuba diving ===
Scuba diving is allowed with a permit in the St Croix offshore restricted zone, the Cannon Rock controlled zone, and the Sundays offshore controlled zone. Named dive sites include:

- Bird Island 33.840°S 26.287°E
- Brenton Island 33.817°S 25.765°E
- Evan's Peak 33.8431°S 25.8166°E
- St Croix Island Scuba Trails 33.797°S 25.770°E

== Threats ==
=== Shipping noise and bunkering ===
The MPA faces significant threats from maritime traffic in Algoa Bay. The introduction of ship-to-ship bunkering (refuelling) in 2016 led to a doubling of vessel numbers and a near 100% increase in underwater noise intensity. Research has strongly correlated this noise surge with a catastrophic decline in the African penguin population on St. Croix Island, which fell by 85% from 8,500 breeding pairs in 2016 to 1,200 pairs in 2021. By 2024, some reports indicated the colony had dropped by 90% since 2017. Researchers like Professor Lorien Pichegru have described Algoa Bay as potentially the "noisiest bay in the world" and have documented how the noise alters penguin foraging trips.

A temporary halt in bunkering activities in 2023, due to a tax dispute, resulted in quieter seas and a 70% rebound in penguin numbers at St. Croix, reinforcing the link between noise pollution and the penguins' decline.

=== Oil spills ===
Ship-to-ship bunkering activities have also been linked to several oil spills in the bay. Four spills were recorded between 2016 and 2022, with another spill reported on 7 September 2024, after which twelve oiled penguins were admitted to SANCCOB for rehabilitation.

== Ecology ==
Marine ecoregions of the South African Exclusive Economic Zone: Addo Elephant National Park Marine Protected Area is in the Aguhas ecoregion.

The MPA is in the warm-temperate Agulhas inshore marine ecoregion. Nelson Mandela Bay has the highest proportion of endemic marine invertebrates and seaweeds on the South African coast. The MPA protects diverse habitats, including rocky shores, sandy beaches, offshore reefs, soft sediments, estuaries, and cold-water coral gardens.

=== Marine species diversity ===
==== Animals ====
- Mammals: The MPA protects a breeding colony of Cape fur seals (Arctocephalus pusillus pusillus) on Seal Island, as well as several whale species, including the southern right whale (Eubalaena australis).
- Birds: Bird Island is home to the world's largest breeding colony of Cape gannets (Morus capensis), with over 160,000 individuals. The St. Croix and Bird Island groups together hold approximately 30% of South Africa's remaining African penguin (Spheniscus demersus) population, though this population is critically endangered due to the threats of shipping noise and oil spills.
- Fish: The MPA is critical for the protection of over-exploited linefish like kob (Argyrosomus spp.) and provides nursery habitat for kingklip.
- Invertebrates: Research indicates that adult African penguins in the MPA feed on squid (Loligo reynaudii), highlighting the importance of managing squid fisheries in the region to support the penguin population.

== See also ==
Marine protected areas of South Africa

- Addo Elephant National Park – Wildlife conservation park near Gqeberha in the Eastern Cape, South Africa
- List of protected areas of South Africa
- Marine protected areas of South Africa – Protected areas of coastline or ocean in the EEZ of South Africa
