= Benguela Muds Marine Protected Area =

Marine conservation area off the Western Cape province of South Africa

- Benguela Muds MPA location
- Location: Western Cape province, South Africa
- Nearest city: Saldanha
- Coordinates: 32°39′S 16°44.5′E
- Area: 72 km^{2} (28 sq mi)
- Established: 2019
- Benguela Muds Marine Protected Area (South Africa)

The Benguela Muds Marine Protected Area is an offshore conservation region on the continental slope of the west coast in the exclusive economic zone of South Africa.

== Purpose ==
A marine protected area is defined by the IUCN as "A clearly defined geographical space, recognised, dedicated and managed, through legal or other effective means, to achieve the long-term conservation of nature with associated ecosystem services and cultural values".

The MPA is intended to protect threatened remnants of mud habitats.

== Extent ==
The MPA is about 50 nautical miles west of Saldanha Bay in the Western Cape. The protected area of ocean is 72 km^{2} in the 350 to 400 m depth zone. The water column, seabed, and subsoil are all part of the area protected.

=== Boundaries ===
The MPA is bounded by:

- Northern boundary: S32°35’, E16°40’ to S32°35’, E16°44’
- Eastern boundary: S32°35’, E16°44’ to S32°43’, E16°49’
- Southern boundary: S32°43’, E16°49’ to S32°43’, E16°45’
- Western boundary: S32°43’, E16°45’ back to S32°35’, E16°40’

=== Zonation ===
The MPA is a single controlled zone.

== Management ==
The marine protected areas of South Africa are the responsibility of the national government, which has management agreements with a variety of MPA management authorities, which manage the MPAs with funding from the SA Government through the Department of Environmental Affairs (DEA).

The Department of Agriculture, Forestry and Fisheries is responsible for issuing permits, quotas and law enforcement.

== Geography ==
=== Climate ===
The climate of the South-western Cape is markedly different from the rest of South Africa, which is a summer rainfall region, receiving most of its rainfall during the summer months of December to February. The South-western Cape has a Mediterranean type climate, with most of its rainfall during the winter months from June to September.

During the summer, the dominant factor determining the weather in the region is a high pressure zone, known as the Atlantic High, located over the South Atlantic ocean to the west of the Cape coast. Winds circulating in an anticlockwise direction from such a system reach the Cape from the south-east, producing periods of up to several days of high winds and mostly clear skies. These winds keep the region relatively cool. Because of its south facing aspect Betty's Bay is exposed to these winds.

Winter in the South-western Cape is characterised by disturbances in the circumpolar westerly winds, resulting in a series of eastward moving depressions. These bring cool cloudy weather and rain from the north west. The south westerly winds over the South Atlantic produce the prevailing south-westerly swell typical of the winter months, which beat on the exposed coastline.

== Ecology ==
Marine ecoregions of the South African Exclusive Economic Zone: Benguela Muds Marine Protected Area is in the Benguela ecoregion

(describe position, biodiversity and endemism of the region) The MPA is in the warm temperate Benguela ecoregion to the west of Cape Point which extends northwards to the Orange River. There are a moderate proportion of species endemic to South Africa along this coastline.

Three major habitats exist in the sea in this region, two of them distinguished by the nature of the substrate. The substrate, or base material, is important in that it provides a base to which an organism can anchor itself, which is vitally important for those organisms which need to stay in one particular kind of place. Rocky shores and reefs provide a firm fixed substrate for the attachment of plants and animals. Sedimentary bottoms are a relatively unstable substrate and cannot anchor kelp or many of the other benthic organisms. Finally there is open water, above the substrate and clear of the benthos, where the organisms must drift or swim. Mixed habitats are also frequently found, which are a combination of those mentioned above.

Rocky reefs There are rocky reefs and mixed rocky and sandy bottoms. For many marine organisms the substrate is another type of marine organism, and it is common for several layers to co-exist.

The type of rock of the reef is of some importance, as it influences the range of possibilities for the local topography, which in turn influences the range of habitats provided, and therefore the diversity of inhabitants. Sandstone and other sedimentary rocks erode and weather very differently, and depending on the direction of dip and strike, and steepness of the dip, may produce reefs which are relatively flat to very high profile and full of small crevices. These features may be at varying angles to the shoreline and wave fronts. There are fewer large holes, tunnels and crevices in sandstone reefs, but often many deep but low near-horizontal crevices.

Sedimentary bottoms (including silt, mud, sand, shelly, pebble and gravel bottoms) Sedimentary bottoms at first glance appear to be fairly barren areas, as they lack the stability to support many of the spectacular reef based species, and the variety of large organisms is relatively low. The sediment may be moved around by water action, to a greater or lesser degree depending on weather conditions and exposure of the area. This means that sessile organisms must be specifically adapted to areas of relatively loose substrate to thrive in them, and the variety of species found on a sedimentary bottom will depend on all these factors. Unconsolidated sedimentary bottoms have one important compensation for their instability, animals can burrow into the sand and move up and down within its layers, which can provide feeding opportunities and protection from predation. Other species can dig themselves holes in which to shelter, or may feed by filtering water drawn through the tunnel, or by extending body parts adapted to this function into the water above the sand.

The open sea The pelagic water column is the major part of the living space at sea. This is the water between the surface and the top of the benthic zone, where living organisms swim, float or drift. The food chain starts with phytoplankton, the microscopic photosynthetic organisms that convert the energy of sunlight into organic material which feeds nearly everything else, directly or indirectly. In temperate seas there are distinct seasonal cycles of phytoplankton growth, based on the available nutrients and the available sunlight. Either can be a limiting factor. Phytoplankton tend to thrive where there is plenty of light, and they themselves are a major factor in restricting light penetration to greater depths, so the photosynthetic zone tends to be shallower in areas of high productivity. Zooplankton feed on the phytoplankton, and are in turn eaten by larger animals. The larger pelagic animals are generally faster moving and more mobile, giving them the option of changing depth to feed or to avoid predation, and to move to other places in search of a better food supply.

== See also ==
Marine protected areas of South Africa

- List of protected areas of South Africa
- Marine protected areas of South Africa – Protected areas of coastline or ocean in the EEZ of South Africa
