= Marine Living Resources Act, 1998 =

South African statutory law to provide for the conservation of the marine ecosystem

The Marine Living Resources Act, 18 of 1998 is a South African statutory law to provide for the conservation of the marine ecosystem and sustainable utilisation of marine living resources within the territorial waters and exclusive economic zone of the Republic of South Africa.

== Purpose ==
The purpose as stated in the preamble is:

To provide for the conservation of the marine ecosystem, the long-term sustainable utilisation of marine living resources and the orderly access to exploitation, utilisation and protection of certain marine living resources; and for these purposes to provide for the exercise of control over marine living resources in a fair and equitable manner to the benefit of all the citizens of South Africa; and to provide for matters connected therewith.

== Promulgation ==
The act was published in Gazette No. 18930, as Notice No 747, with Commencement date 1 September 1998, and is amended by:

- Marine Living Resources Amendment Act 68 of 2000, published in Gazette No. 21844, Notice No. 1315.
- National Environmental Management: Protected Areas Act 57 of 2003, published as Government Notice 445 in Government Gazette 37710 of 2 June 2014
- Marine Living Resources Amendment Act 5 of 2014, published as Government Notice 383 in Government Gazette 37659 of 19 May 2014
