= List of marine protected areas =

Marine protected areas of the world

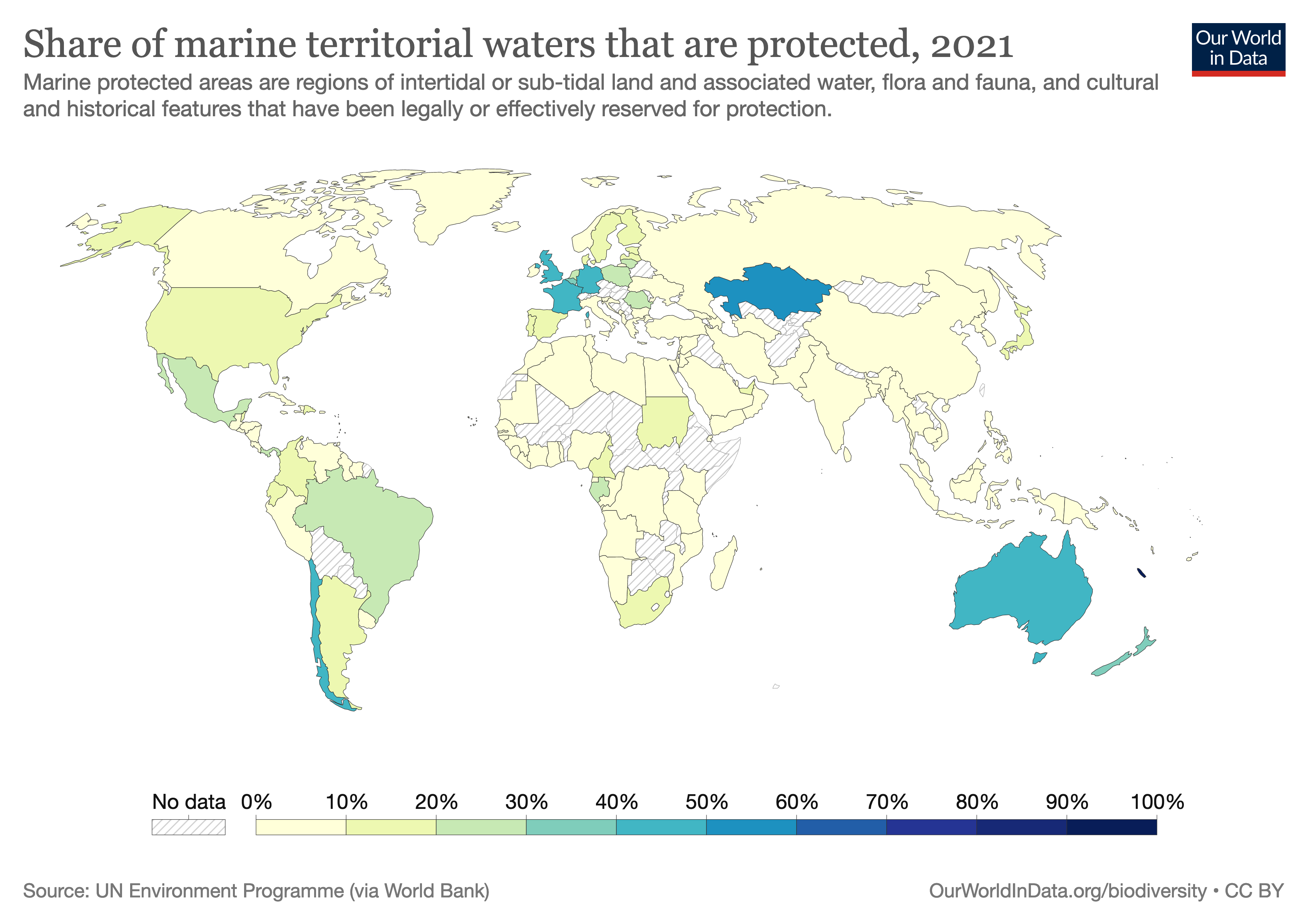
Map showing the share of marine territorial waters protected by country (2021)

A marine protected area (MPA) is a protected area that includes primarily marine environment and biodiversity.

The International Union for Conservation of Nature (IUCN) defines a protected area as:

"A clearly defined geographical space, recognised, dedicated and managed, through legal or other effective means, to achieve the long-term conservation of nature with associated ecosystem services and cultural values."

This definition is intended to make it more difficult to claim MPA status for regions where exploitation of marine resources occurs. If there is no defined long-term goal for conservation and ecological recovery and extraction of marine resources occurs, a region is not considered a marine protected area.

As of June 2019 there are 14,830 marine protected areas with a total area of 27,495,595 km^{2} (10,616,109 sq mi) representing 7.59% of the ocean.

== Africa ==
=== Kenya ===
- Kiunga Marine National Reserve – National reserve in Coast Province, Kenya, 1979, 270 km^{2} (100 sq mi)
- Mombasa Marine National Park and Reserve – Kenyan game park, 1986, 10 km^{2} (3.9 sq mi)
- Watamu Marine National Park – Marine park in Kenya, 1968

=== Madagascar ===
- Nosy Ve-Androka National Park – Protected Marine Area of Madagascar, 2015, 19.6 km^{2} (7.6 sq mi)

=== Mozambique ===
- Bazaruto National Park – Marine and terrestrial protected area in the Bazaruto Archipelago in Mozambique, 1971, 1,600 km^{2} (620 sq mi)

=== South Africa ===
The listed MPAs were individually proclaimed. Some were later consolidated with adjacent MPAs and may not still be generally referred to by the original name.

- Addo Elephant National Park Marine Protected Area – Marine conservation area in South Africa, (2019), 1,200 km^{2} (460 sq mi)
- Agulhas Bank Complex Marine Protected Area – Offshore marine conservation area south of Cape Agulhas in South Africa, (2019), 4,300 km^{2} (1,700 sq mi)
- Agulhas Front Marine Protected Area – Offshore marine conservation area off the Eastern Cape in South Africa's EEZ, (2019), 6,200 km^{2} (2,400 sq mi)
- Agulhas Muds Marine Protected Area – Marine conservation area offshore of the Western Cape in South Africa, (2019), 207 km^{2} (80 sq mi)
- Aliwal Shoal Marine Protected Area – Marine conservation area at Aliwal Shoal off the coast of KwaZulu-Natal, South Africa, (2004), 670 km^{2} (260 sq mi)
- Aliwal Shoal Offshore Marine Protected Area – 2019 extension to the Aliwal Shoal Marine Protected Area, (2019), integrated with Aliwal Shoal MPA
- Amathole Offshore Marine Protected Area – Marine conservation area in the Eastern Cape in South Africa, (2019), 400 km^{2} (150 sq mi)
- Benguela Muds Marine Protected Area – Marine conservation area off the Western Cape province of South Africa, (2019), 72 km^{2} (28 sq mi)
- Betty's Bay Marine Protected Area – Marine conservation area in the Western Cape in South Africa, (2000), 20.14 km^{2} (7.78 sq mi)
- Bird Island Marine Protected Area – Marine conservation area in the Eastern Cape in South Africa, (2004),
- Browns Bank Corals Marine Protected Area – Marine conservation area on the continental slope of South Africa, (2019), 399 km^{2} (154 sq mi)
- Cape Canyon Marine Protected Area – Marine conservation area off the coast of South Africa, (2019), 580 km^{2} (220 sq mi)
- Castle Rock Marine Protected Area, previously known as the Millers Point Marine Reserve, now part of Table Mountain National Park Marine Protected Area (2000)
- Childs Bank Marine Protected Area – Marine conservation area off the west coast of South Africa, (2019), 1,335 km^{2} (515 sq mi)
- De Hoop Marine Protected Area – Marine conservation area on the coast of South Africa, (2000), 288.9 km^{2} (111.5 sq mi)
- Dwesa-Cwebe Marine Protected Area – Coastal marine conservation area in the Eastern Cape, South Africa, (2000), 199 km^{2} (77 sq mi)
- Goukamma Marine Protected Area – Marine conservation area the Western Cape in South Africa, (2000), 32 km^{2} (12 sq mi)
- Helderberg Marine Protected Area – Marine conservation area in the Western Cape in South Africa, (2000), 24.6 km^{2} (9.5 sq mi)
- Hluleka Marine Protected Area – Marine conservation area in the Eastern Cape in South Africa, (2000), 40.86 km^{2} (15.78 sq mi)
- iSimangaliso Marine Protected Area – Marine conservation area in northern kwaZulu-Natal in South Africa (KwaZulu-Natal) 443 km^{2} (171 sq mi)
- iSimangaliso Offshore Marine Protected Area – Large 2019 extension to the iSimangaliso marine protected area, (2019), 10,700 km^{2} (4,100 sq mi)
- Jutten Island Marine Protected Area – Marine conservation area in Saldanha Bay in South Africa, (2000), 1.11 km^{2} (0.43 sq mi)
- Langebaan Lagoon Marine Protected Area – Marine conservation area in South Africa, (2000), 280 km^{2} (110 sq mi)
- Malgas Island Marine Protected Area – Marine conservation area on the west coast in the Western Cape province in South Africa, (2000), 0.66 km^{2} (0.25 sq mi)
- Maputaland Marine Protected Area – Marine conservation area in northern kwaZulu-Natal in South Africa, (2000), 384.54 km^{2} (148.47 sq mi)
- Marcus Island Marine Protected Area – Marine conservation area in the Western Cape in South Africa, (Western Cape) 0.26 km^{2} (0.10 sq mi)
- Namaqua Fossil Forest Marine Protected Area – Marine conservation area off South Africa, (2019), 1,200 km^{2} (460 sq mi)
- Namaqua National Park Marine Protected Area – Marine conservation area in Namaqualand in the Northern Cape, in South Africa, (2019), 500 km^{2} (190 sq mi)
- Orange Shelf Edge Marine Protected Area – Marine conservation area off the Northern Cape in South Africa, (2019), 2,000 km^{2} (770 sq mi)
- Pondoland Marine Protected Area – Marine conservation area in the Eastern Cape province of South Africa, (2004), 1,380 km^{2} (530 sq mi)
- Port Elizabeth Corals Marine Protected Area – Marine conservation area off the Eastern Cape in South Africa, (2019), 270 km^{2} (100 sq mi)
- Prince Edward Islands Marine Protected Area – Indian Ocean region in South Africa's EEZ, (2013), 181,229.46 km^{2} (69,973.09 sq mi)
- Protea Banks Marine Protected Area – Marine conservation area in KwaZulu-Natal, South Africa, (2019), 1,200 km^{2} (460 sq mi)
- Robben Island Marine Protected Area – Marine conservation area in South Africa, (2019), 580 km^{2} (220 sq mi)
- Robberg Marine Protected Area – Coastal conservation area in the Western Cape of South Africa, (2000), 42 km^{2} (16 sq mi)
- Sardinia Bay Marine Protected Area – Marine conservation area in the Eastern Cape in South Africa, (2000), 12.91 km^{2} (4.98 sq mi)
- Sixteen Mile Beach Marine Protected Area – Marine conservation area the Western Cape in South Africa, (2000), 106.91 km^{2} (41.28 sq mi)
- Southeast Atlantic Seamounts Marine Protected Area – Marine conservation area in the South Atlantic in the South African EEZ, (2019), 6,000 km^{2} (2,300 sq mi)
- Southwest Indian Seamounts Marine Protected Area – Marine conservation area south of Stilbaai in the Western Cape in South Africa, (2019), 7,500 km^{2} (2,900 sq mi)
- Stilbaai Marine Protected Area – Marine conservation area in the Western Cape in South Africa, (2008), 20 km^{2} (7.7 sq mi)
- Table Mountain National Park Marine Protected Area – Marine conservation area around the Cape Peninsula in South Africa, (2004), 953.25 km^{2} (368.05 sq mi)
- Trafalgar Marine Protected Area – Marine conservation area (in region) in South Africa, (2000), .29 km^{2} (0.11 sq mi)
- Tsitsikamma Marine Protected Area – Marine conservation area on the south coast of South Africa, (2000), 186 km^{2} (72 sq mi)
- uThukela Banks Marine Protected Area – Marine conservation area off the coast of kwaZulu-Natal in South Africa, (2019), 5,666 km^{2} (2,188 sq mi)
- Walker Bay Whale Sanctuary – Marine conservation area in the Western Cape province in South Africa, (2001, seasonal), 112.49 km^{2} (43.43 sq mi)

=== Tanzania ===
- Dar es Salaam Marine Reserve – Group of marine wildlife reserves in Tanzania, 1975, 15 km^{2} (5.8 sq mi)
- Menai Bay Conservation Area – Conservation area in Zanzibar, Tanzania, 1997, 470 km^{2} (180 sq mi)
- Tanga Marine Reserves – Group of marine wildlife reserves in Tanzania, 2010, 552 km^{2} (213 sq mi)

== Antarctica ==
- Ross Sea Region Marine Protected Area, 2,060,058 km^{2} (795,393 sq mi)

== Asia ==
=== Cambodia ===
- Koh Rong Marine National Park – National park in Cambodia, 2018, 524.48 km^{2} (202.50 sq mi). IUCN Category V.

=== India ===
- Gulf of Mannar Marine National Park – Protected area of India, 1986, 560 km^{2} (220 sq mi)
- Mahatma Gandhi Marine National Park – National park on the Andaman Islands in India, 1983, 281.5 km^{2} (108.7 sq mi)
- Marine National Park, Gulf of Kutch – National park in Gujarat, India, 1982, 162.89 km^{2} (62.89 sq mi)

=== Indonesia ===
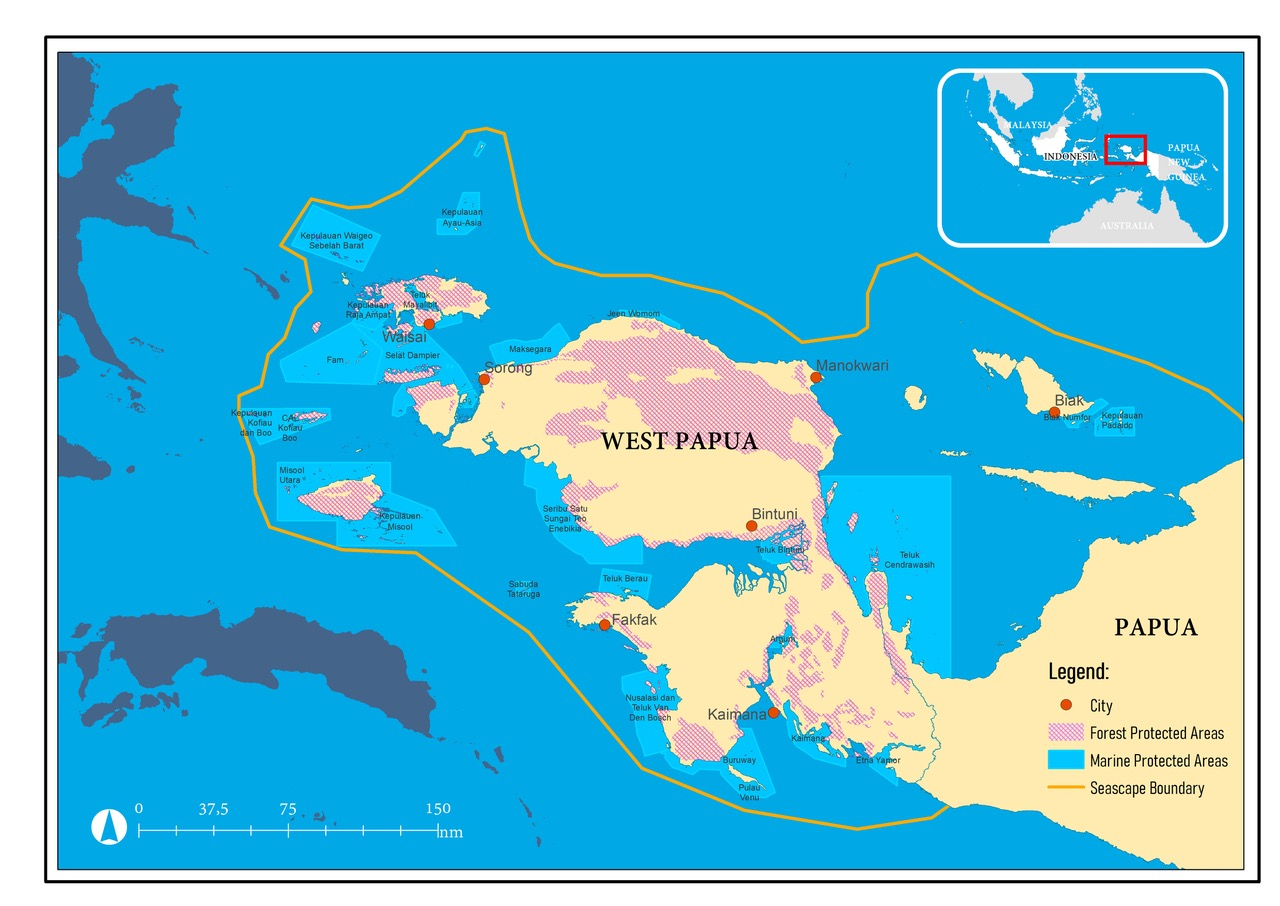
Marine protected areas in the Bird's Head Peninsula, Indonesia.

- Bunaken National Park – Marine park in the north of Sulawesi island, Indonesia, 1991, 890 km^{2} (340 sq mi)
- Karimunjawa National Park – National park in Central Java, Indonesia, 1,101.17 km^{2} (425.16 sq mi)
- Komodo National Park – National park in Indonesia, 1991, 2,193.22 km^{2} (846.81 sq mi).
- Teluk Cenderawasih National Park – National park in Indonesia, 2002, 14,535 km^{2} (5,612 sq mi)

=== Malaysia ===
- Miri-Sibuti Coral Reef National Park – Protected area in Malaysia, 2007, 1,721.11 km^{2} (664.52 sq mi). IUCN Category II.
- Sugud Islands Marine Conservation Area – Marine protected area in Beluran district in Sabah, Malaysia, 2001, 463.17 km^{2} (178.83 sq mi). IUCN Category II.
- Tun Mustapha Marine Park – Marine park in Malaysia, 2016. IUCN Category II.
- Tunku Abdul Rahman National Park – National park in Malaysia, 1974. IUCN Category II.

=== Maldives ===
- South Ari Atoll MPA – Protected area in Maldives

=== Thailand ===
- Ao Phang Nga National Park – National park in southern Thailand, 1981, 400 km^{2} (150 sq mi). IUCN Category II.
- Hat Chao Mai National Park – Marine protected area in Trang Province, Thailand, 1981, 230.86 km^{2} (89.14 sq mi). IUCN Category II.
- Hat Noppharat Thara–Mu Ko Phi Phi National Park – Marine protected area in Krabi Province, Thailand, 1983, 37.9 km^{2} (14.6 sq mi), IUCN Category II.
- Khao Laem Ya–Mu Ko Samet National Park – National Park in Thailand, 1981, 131 km^{2} (51 sq mi). IUCN Category II.
- Khao Sam Roi Yot National Park – National marine park in Thailand, 1966, 98.08 km^{2} (37.87 sq mi). IUCN Category II.
- Laem Son National Park – National park in Thailand, 1983, 315 km^{2} (122 sq mi). IUCN Category II.
- Mu Ko Ang Thong National Park – Marine protected area in Surat Thani Province of Thailand, 1980, 102 km^{2} (39 sq mi). IUCN Category II.
- Mu Ko Chang National Park – National park of Thailand, 1982, 650 km^{2} (250 sq mi). IUCN Category II.
- Mu Ko Lanta National Park – Marine protected area in the southern part of Krabi Province, Thailand, 1990, 134 km^{2} (52 sq mi). IUCN Category II.
- Mu Ko Phetra National Park – Marine protected area in the Strait of Malacca off Thailand, 1984, 494.38 km^{2} (190.88 sq mi). IUCN Category II.
- Similan Islands – Marine protected area in Phang Nga Province, southern Thailand, 1982, 114 km^{2} (44 sq mi). IUCN Category II.
- Surin Islands – Marine protected archipelago in Andaman Sea, Thailand, 1981, 141.25 km^{2} (54.54 sq mi). IUCN Category II.
- Tarutao National Park – Marine national park of Thailand, 1976, 1,490 km^{2} (580 sq mi). IUCN Category II.

== Europe ==
=== Finland ===
- Metsäkuohu, (2018), 0.08 km^{2} (0.031 sq mi)
- Tervapesä, (2018), 0.07 km^{2} (0.027 sq mi)

=== Sweden ===
- Småbodarna, (2018), 0.11 km^{2} (0.042 sq mi)
- Långstrandberget, (2018), 0.74 km^{2} (0.29 sq mi)
- Björkbergsbacken, (2018), 0.14 km^{2} (0.054 sq mi)
- Höksberget, (2018), 0.56 km^{2} (0.22 sq mi)

=== United Kingdom ===
- Port Erin Bay MNR, Isle of Man, (2018), 4.34 km^{2} (1.68 sq mi)

UK Overseas Territories

- Ascension Island Marine Protected Area, South Atlantic
- Pitcairn Islands, South Pacific Ocean
- St Helena, South Atlantic
- South Orkneys, British Antarctic Territory
- South Georgia & the South Sandwich Islands, Southern Atlantic
- Tristan da Cunha, Southern Atlantic

== North America ==
=== Canada ===
In Canada, the constitutional division of powers between the federal government and the provinces as it relates to the marine environment is complex. In general, the federal government coordinates the protection of marine areas in cooperation with provincial authorities. The federal marine protected areas network consists of three core programs: Marine Protected Areas protected under the Oceans Act, marine National Wildlife Areas protected under the Canada Wildlife Act, and National Marine Conservation Areas protected under the Canada National Marine Conservation Areas Act.

=== Cuba ===
- East Los Colorados Archipelago

=== United States ===
- List of U.S. National Marine Sanctuaries
- List of marine protected areas of California
- Cabrillo State Marine Reserve – Marine protected area on California's coast, (2010), .38 sq mi (0.98 km^{2})
- Steller Sea Lion Protection Areas, Gulf, (2002), 866,717 km^{2} (334,641 sq mi)
- Pacific Remote Islands, (2009), 1,277,860.0 km^{2} (493,384.5 sq mi), IUCN Category V

== Oceania ==
=== Australia ===
- Coral Sea Marine Park – Marine protected areas managed by the Australian government, (2012), 995,251 km^{2} (384,269 sq mi)
- Great Barrier Reef Marine Park – Protected area of Queensland, Australia
- Heard Island and McDonald Islands Marine Reserve, 71,200 km^{2} (27,500 sq mi)
- North Network – Marine protected areas managed by the Australian government
  - Arafura Marine Park – Marine protected area in Australia
  - Arnhem Marine Park – Australian marine park in the North Marine Parks network
  - Gulf of Carpentaria Marine Park – Australian marine park in the Gulf of Carpentaria, offshore of Queensland, (2018), 23,771 km^{2} (9,178 sq mi), IUCN category VI
  - Joseph Bonaparte Gulf Marine Park – Australian marine park in the North Marine Parks network
  - Limmen Marine Park – Australian marine park in the North Marine Parks network
  - Oceanic Shoals Marine Park – Australian marine park offshore of the Northern Territory, near Darwin, (2018), 71,743 km^{2} (27,700 sq mi), IUCN category VI
  - West Cape York Marine Park – Australian marine park offshore of Queensland, 16,012 km^{2} (6,182 sq mi), IUCN category IV
  - Wessel Marine Park – Australian marine park in the North Marine Parks network
- North-west Network – Marine protected areas managed by the Australian government
  - Argo-Rowley Terrace Marine Park – Australian marine park north-west of Broome, Western Australia, (2018), 146,003 km^{2} (56,372 sq mi), IUCN category VI
  - Ashmore Reef Marine Park – Protected marine park in Australia, (1983), 146,003 km^{2} (56,372 sq mi), IUCN category Ia.
  - Carnarvon Marine Park – Australian marine park in the North-West Network, Western Australia
  - Cartier Island Marine Park – Protected marine park in Australia (2000) 172 km^{2} (66 sq mi), IUCN category Ia
  - Dampier Marine Park – Australian marine park north-east of Karratha, Western Australia, (2018), 1,252 m^{2} (13,480 sq ft), IUCN category VI
  - Eighty Mile Beach Marine Park – Australian marine park in the North-west Marine Parks network
  - Gascoyne Marine Park – Australian marine park west of the Cape Range Peninsula, Western Australia, (2018), 81,766 km^{2} (31,570 sq mi), IUCN category IV
  - Kimberley Marine Park – Australian marine park offshore of Western Australia, near the Kimberley region, (2018), 74,469 km^{2} (28,753 sq mi), IUCN category VI
  - Mermaid Reef Marine Park – Australian marine park in the Rowley Shoals north-west of Broome, Western Australia, (1991), 540 km^{2} (210 sq mi), IUCN category II
  - Montebello Marine Park – Australian marine park in the North-west Marine Parks network
  - Ningaloo Marine Park (Commonwealth waters) – Australian marine park west of the Ningaloo Coast of Western Australia, (1987), 2,435 km^{2} (940 sq mi), IUCN category IV
  - Roebuck Marine Park – Australian marine park in the North-west Marine Parks network
  - Shark Bay Marine Park – Marine protected area in Western Australia
- Temperate East Network – Marine protected areas managed by the Australian government
  - Central Eastern Marine Park – Offshore protected area in New South Wales, Australia, (2018), 70,054 km^{2} (27,048 sq mi), IUCN category IV
  - Cod Grounds Marine Park – Australian marine park off Laurieton, New South Wales, (2007), 4 km^{2} (1.5 sq mi), UCN category II
  - Gifford Marine Park – Australian marine protection area
  - Hunter Marine Park – Australian marine park in the Temperate East Marine Parks network
  - Jervis Marine Park – Australian marine park in the Temperate East Marine Parks network
  - Lord Howe Marine Park – Australian marine park offshore of New South Wales, near Lord Howe Island, (2018), 110,126 km^{2} (42,520 sq mi), IUCN category IV
  - Norfolk Marine Park – Australian marine park offshore of Norfolk Island, (2018), 188,444 km^{2} (72,759 sq mi), IUCN category IV
  - Solitary Islands Marine Park – Marine protected area in New South Wales, Australia
- South-east Network – Marine protected areas managed by the Australian government
  - Apollo Marine Park – Marine park in Australia in Bass Strait off the coast of Victoria, (2007), 2,928 km^{2} (1,131 sq mi), IUCN category VI
  - Beagle Commonwealth Marine Reserve – Australian marine protected area in the Bass Strai off Victoria, (2007), 2,928 km^{2} (1,131 sq mi), IUCN category VI
  - Boags Commonwealth Marine Reserve – Australian marine protected area in Bass Strait off north-west Tasmania, (2007), 537 km^{2} (207 sq mi), IUCN category VI
  - East Gippsland Commonwealth Marine Reserve – Australian marine protexted area near the New South Wales-Victoria border, (2007), 4,137 km^{2} (1,597 sq mi), IUCN category VI
  - Flinders Commonwealth Marine Reserve – Australian marine protected area off north-east Tasmania, (2007), 27,043 km^{2} (10,441 sq mi), IUCN category II
  - Franklin Commonwealth Marine Reserve – Australian marine protected area off north-west Tasmania, (2007), 671 km^{2} (259 sq mi), IUCN category VI
  - Freycinet Commonwealth Marine Reserve – Australian marine protected area east of Tasmania, (2007), 57,942 km^{2} (22,372 sq mi), IUCN category II
  - Huon Commonwealth Marine Reserve – Australian marine protected area south of Hobart, Tasmania, (2007), 9,991 km^{2} (3,858 sq mi), IUCN category VI
  - Macquarie Island Marine Park – Australian Marine Park near Macquarie Island in the southwest Pacific, (1999), 162,000 km^{2} (63,000 sq mi), IUCN category IV
  - Murray Commonwealth Marine Reserve – Australian marine protected area off the coast of South Australia, (2007), 25,803 km^{2} (9,963 sq mi), IUCN category VI
  - Nelson Commonwealth Marine Reserve – Australian marine protected area near the South Australia-Victoria border, (2007), 6,123 km^{2} (2,364 sq mi), IUCN category VI
  - South Tasman Rise Commonwealth Marine Reserve – Marine protected area south of Tasmania, (2007), 27,704 km^{2} (10,697 sq mi), IUCN category VI
  - Tasman Fracture Commonwealth Marine Reserve – Australian marine protected area off south-west Tasmania, (2007), 42,502 km^{2} (16,410 sq mi), IUCN category VI
  - Zeehan Commonwealth Marine Reserve – Australian marine protected area west of Tasmania, (2007), 19,897 km^{2} (7,682 sq mi), IUCN category VI
- South-west Network – Marine protected areas managed by the Australian government
  - Abrolhos Marine Park – Australian marine park in the South-west Marine Parks network
  - Bremer Marine Park – Marine protected area off Western Australia, (2013), 4,472 km^{2} (1,727 sq mi), IUCN category VI
  - Eastern Recherche Marine Park – Marine protected area off Western Australia
  - Geographe Marine Park – Australian marine park in the South-west Marine Parks network
  - Great Australian Bight Marine Park – Marine protected area in the Great Australian Bight off South Australia, (2012), 45,926 km^{2} (17,732 sq mi), IUCN category VI
  - Jurien Marine Park – Australian marine park in the South-west Marine Parks network
  - Murat Marine Park – Protected area in Australia, (2012), 937.77 km^{2} (362.08 sq mi), IUCN category II
  - Perth Canyon Marine Park – Australian marine park in the South-west Marine Parks network
  - South-west Corner Marine Park – Marine protected area off Western Australia, (2013), 271,833 km^{2} (104,955 sq mi), IUCN category VI
  - Southern Kangaroo Island Marine Park – Marine protected area south of Kangaroo Island in South Australia, (2012), 629.93 km^{2} (243.22 sq mi), IUCN category VI
  - Twilight Marine Park – Australian marine park in the South-west Marine Parks network
  - Two Rocks Marine Park – Australian marine park in the South-west Marine Parks network
  - Western Eyre Marine Park – Marine protected area in the Great Australian Bight, off South Australia, (2012), 57,946 km^{2} (22,373 sq mi), IUCN category VI
  - Western Kangaroo Island Marine Park – Marine protected area south-west of Kangaroo Island in Australia, (2012), 2,335.31 km^{2} (901.67 sq mi), IUCN category VI

=== Cook Islands ===
- Marae Moana – Marine protected area in the Cook Islands, (2017), 1,981,965 km^{2} (765,241 sq mi), IUCN Category VI.

=== New Zealand ===
- Poor Knights Islands – Group of islands and marine reserve off the east coast of New Zealand's North Island, 1981, 19.22 km^{2} (7.42 sq mi), IUCN Category Ia.
- Cape Rodney-Okakari Point, 1975, 5.56 km^{2} (2.15 sq mi), IUCN Category Ia.
- Moutere Hauriri / Bounty Islands, 2014, 1,046.33 km^{2} (403.99 sq mi), IUCN Category Ia.
- Moutere Mahue / Antipodes Island, 2014, 2,173.1 km^{2} (839.0 sq mi), IUCN Category Ia.
- Tawharanui – Peninisula in the North Island of New Zealand, 2011, 3.94 km^{2} (1.52 sq mi), IUCN Category Ia.
- Tuhua (Mayor Island), 1992, 10.55 km^{2} (4.07 sq mi), IUCN Category Ia.

=== Palau ===
- Palau National Marine Sanctuary – Protected area in Palau, 2015, 502,538.78 km^{2} (194,031.31 sq mi)

== South America ==
=== Brazil ===
- Abrolhos Marine National Park
- Ilhas dos Currais Marine National Park
- Fernando de Noronha Marine National Park
- Areia Vermelha Marine State Park
- Pedra da Risca do Meio Marine State Park

=== Chile ===
- Islas Diego Ramírez y Paso Drake, (2019), 1,443.91 km^{2} (557.50 sq mi)
- Humedales Costeros de la Bahía Tongoy, (2018), 2.59 km^{2} (1.00 sq mi)

=== Ecuador ===
- Galápagos Islands – Ecuadorian volcanic archipelago, 1998, 126,972.09 km^{2} (49,024.20 sq mi)

=== Grenada ===
- Grande Anse, (2018), 17.83 km^{2} (6.88 sq mi)

== Areas beyond national jurisdiction ==
- Charlie-Gibbs North High Seas MPA, 2012, 178,651.0 km^{2} (68,977.5 sq mi)
- MAR North of the Azores High Seas MPA, 2010, 93,572.46 km^{2} (36,128.53 sq mi)

== To be integrated ==
- Réserve Naturelle Nationale des Terres australes françaises, (2017) 1,654,999 km^{2} (638,999 sq mi)
- Papahānaumokuākea Marine National Monument – US protected region of ocean and islands, (2006), 1,516,557 km^{2} (585,546 sq mi)
- Parc Naturel de la Mer de Corail, (2014), 1,291,643 km^{2} (498,706 sq mi)
- Pacific Remote Islands, (2009) 1,277,784 km^{2} (493,355 sq mi)
- South Georgia and South Sandwich Islands Marine Protected Area, (2012), 1,069,872 km^{2} (413,080 sq mi)
- Pitcairn Islands Marine Reserve, (2016), 839,568 km^{2} (324,159 sq mi)

== See also ==
- List of largest protected areas
