= Área Marinha Protegida das Avencas =

Avencas Marine Protected Area
- Área Marinha Protegida das Avencas
- Location within Portugal
- Location: Cascais, Lisbon District, Portugal
- Nearest city: Lisbon
- Coordinates: 38°41′23″N 9°22′07″W
- Area: 2.5 km of coastline
- Established: 1998 (as ZIBA); 2016 (as AMPA)
- Governing body: Municipality of Cascais

The Avencas Marine Protected Area (Área Marinha Protegida das Avencas, (AMPA), formerly known as the Avencas Biophysical Interest Zone (Zona de Interesse Biofísico das Avencas, ZIBA), is a marine protected area located on the Atlantic coast of Portugal, in the municipality of Cascais, between São Pedro do Estoril and Parede.

== Geography and boundaries ==
AMPA extends along approximately 2.5 kilometers of coastline in the Lisbon Metropolitan Area. The protected area is bounded by Estrada Marginal (N6 coastal road) to the north and extends one quarter of a nautical mile into the Atlantic Ocean to the south.

Official coordinates (WGS84):

- 38°41'35" N; 9°22'03" W
- 38°41'10" N; 9°21'15" W
- 38°41'23" N; 9°22'11" W
- 38°40'57" N; 9°21'21" W

The area encompasses several beaches including Bafureira, Avencas, and sections of Parede beach, along with rocky platforms, cliff faces, fossil beds, and tide pools characteristic of the region.

== History and legal protection ==
=== Establishment as ZIBA (1998) ===
The area was initially designated as the Avencas Biophysical Interest Zone (ZIBA) in 1998 under the Coastal Zone Management Plan for Cidadela-Forte de São Julião da Barra (POOC), approved by Council of Ministers Resolution No. 123/98 of October 19, 1998. This designation recognized the site's specific geobiological characteristics and value as natural heritage.

=== Reclassification as AMPA (2016) ===
The area was reclassified and expanded as the Avencas Marine Protected Area through Council of Ministers Resolution No. 64/2016 of June 8, 2016. This resolution strengthened protection measures and expanded the geographical boundaries of the protected area.

According to Article 83 of the resolution, the restrictions aim to:

- Conserve and enhance natural heritage and biodiversity
- Protect the rocky intertidal habitat
- Promote environmental education and awareness activities
- Develop a closer, more conscious, and harmonious relationship between citizens and the environment

=== Management ===
Under the 2016 resolution, the Municipality of Cascais was assigned responsibility for environmental monitoring of AMPA on a triennial basis, with authority to temporarily or permanently restrict public access to protect marine living resources. Management activities were coordinated through Cascais Ambiente and the Pedra do Sal Environmental Interpretation Center (CIAPS).

== Geology ==
AMPA features significant geological diversity, including:

- Rock formations: Limestone cliffs 10-20 meters high, cut into marly limestone rich in fossils
- Volcanic formations: Basaltic rock from the Lisbon Volcanic Complex
- Fossil deposits: Extensive beds containing gastropod and bivalve mollusks, echinoderms, rare ammonites, and ichnofossils
- Sedimentary formations: Lumachella (shell limestone) formed at freshwater-saltwater interfaces
- Paleontological features: Traces of fossilized forests and prehistoric animal footprints

The area is included in the National Energy and Geology Laboratory (LNEG) database as a geosite of geological interest.

== Hydrology ==
AMPA is characterized by numerous freshwater springs and waterfalls (exsurgências) that originate from underground aquifers connected to the Serra de Aire cave system. These springs create distinctive geological formations through freshwater calcification processes, producing organic rock structures of scientific and scenic value.

The interaction between freshwater and saltwater creates unique conditions for fossil formation and supports diverse ecosystems.

== Biodiversity ==
=== Marine life ===
The intertidal zone of AMPA supports high biodiversity across three distinct zones:

Infralittoral Zone: Common octopus (Octopus vulgaris), sea urchins, various fish species

Mediolittoral Zone: Starfish, sea lettuce, coralline algae, limpets, mussels, crabs, nudibranchs

Supralittoral Zone: Sea anemones (Actinia), periwinkles, various lichen species

=== Terrestrial flora ===
The cliff areas support Atlantic vegetation including:

- Maidenhair fern (Adiantum capillus-veneris), which gives the area its name
- Sea fennel (Crithmum maritimum)
- Giant reed (Arundo donax)
- Various Tamarix species
- Century plant (Agave americana)

=== Avifauna ===
The rocky cliffs provide nesting habitat for migratory seabirds, including:

- Ruddy turnstone (Arenaria interpres)
- Sanderling (Calidris alba)
- Purple sandpiper (Calidris maritima)

== Scientific and educational importance ==
From 2010 to 2023, AMPA served as an important site for:

- Marine biology research and monitoring
- Intertidal ecosystem studies
- Oceanographic research
- Environmental education programs for schools
- Academic studies in geology, paleontology, and marine biology

The University Institute of Psychological, Social and Life Sciences (ISPA) through its MARE research center conducted annual monitoring reports on biodiversity and human impact from 2010 to 2023.

=== CIAPS Environmental Interpretation Center ===
The Pedra do Sal Environmental Interpretation Center (CIAPS), inaugurated on September 7, 2007, served as the primary facility for coordinating educational visits and scientific research in AMPA. The center managed reservation-based access to the protected area and provided educational programming focused on marine biodiversity and coastal ecosystem conservation.

== Cultural and artistic heritage ==
The natural springs and cave formations of AMPA influenced Portuguese decorative arts, particularly the development of:

- Concheado style (Portuguese variant of French Rocaille)
- Incrustado decorative techniques
- Lapinha style used in traditional nativity scenes

Notable 18th-century examples include fountain designs in the Royal Palace of Queluz and the Marquês de Pombal estate in Oeiras, created by sculptor Joaquim Machado de Castro.

The coastline attracted landscape painters during the Grand Tour era, including Claude Joseph Vernet and Jean-Baptiste Pillement.

== Conservation status ==
AMPA faces ongoing challenges related to:

- Coastal erosion and cliff stability
- Human impact on intertidal habitats
- Climate change effects on marine ecosystems
- Pressure from urban development and tourism

Between 2024 and 2025, extensive coastal protection works were undertaken in the area under EU-funded projects (PACS-FC-02884800 and PACS-FC-01494200) as part of the Portugal 2030 program, which became subject to environmental concerns regarding potential impacts within the protected zone.

== See also ==
- List of marine protected areas
- Coastal management
- Marine conservation
- Cascais
- Sintra-Cascais Natural Park
