= List of largest protected areas =

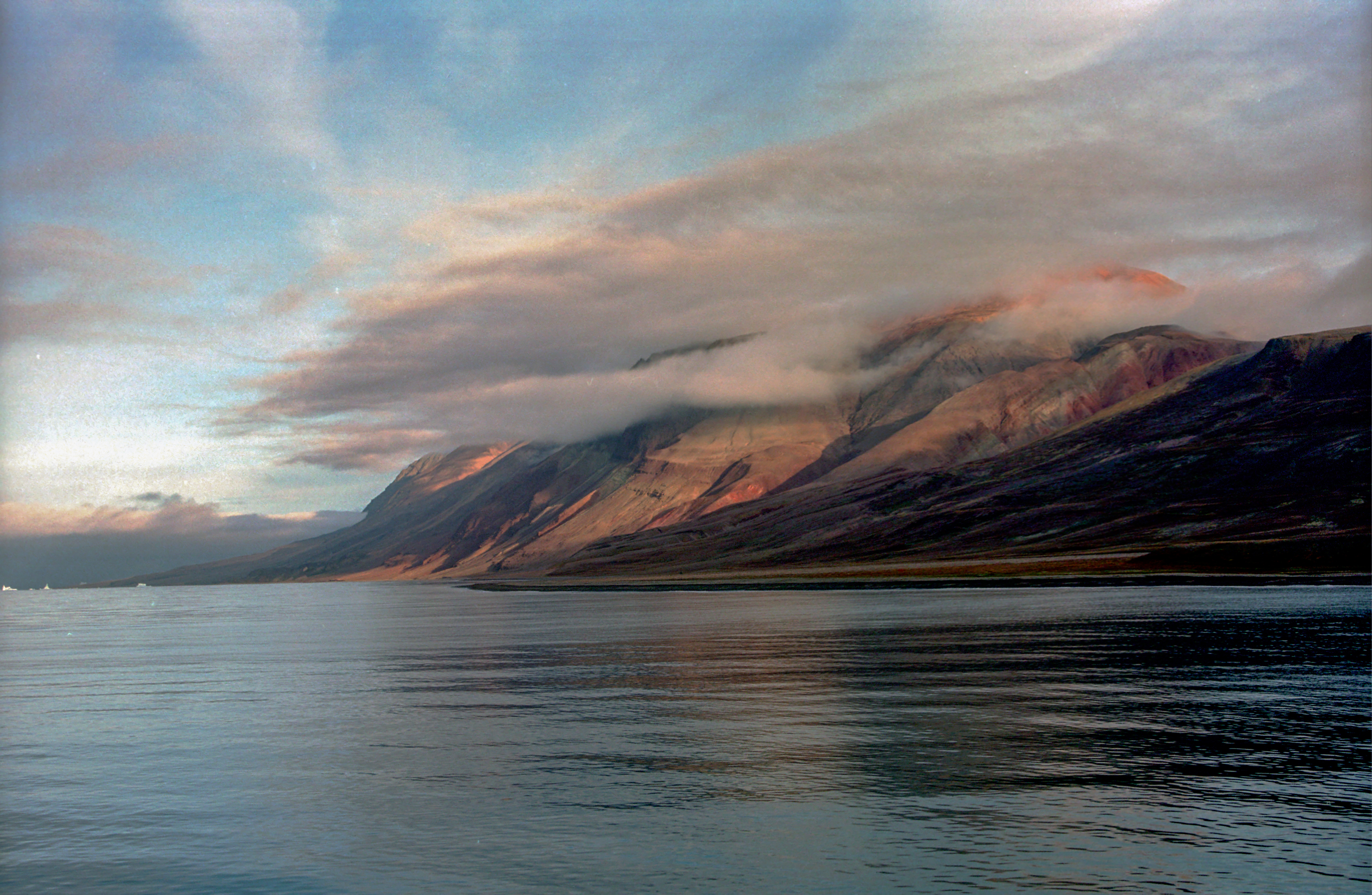
Northeast Greenland National Park is the largest terrestrial protected area in the world.

The World Database on Protected Areas (WDPA) is compiled and managed by the World Conservation Monitoring Centre, an executive agency of the United Nations Environment Programme. It uses the IUCN and CBD definitions of protected areas to determine whether a site should be included in the WDPA. The extent to which each area and the resources within are protected can vary significantly.

The largest protected areas – those exceeding an area of 250,000 square kilometres – are listed below in order of total area protected. All are marine protected areas except for Northeast Greenland National Park – which is mostly terrestrial but also has a marine component – and three entirely terrestrial biosphere reserves in Brazil. Protected areas with multiple coterminous or overlapping designations (e.g. Northeast Greenland National Park and the corresponding Biosphere Reserve) are listed only once.

Currently, Marae Moana is the largest protected area in the world with a total area larger than Mexico (1,964,375 km^{2}).

== Largest protected areas of the world ==
Rank	Name	Country	Location	Size (km^{2})	Year	Ref
1	Marae Moana	Cook Islands	Cook Islands	1,976,000	2017	
2	French Southern Territories National Nature Reserve	France	French Southern and Antarctic Lands	1,600,000	2016	
3	Ross Sea Region Marine Protected Area	Antarctica	Ross Sea	1,550,000	2016	
4	Papahānaumokuākea Marine National Monument	United States	Hawaii and Midway Atoll	1,508,846	2006	
5	Natural Park of the Coral Sea	France	New Caledonia	1,292,967	2014	
6	Pacific Islands Heritage Marine National Monument	United States	Central Pacific Ocean	1,270,480	2009	
7	South Georgia Marine Protected Area	United Kingdom	South Georgia and the South Sandwich Islands	1,240,000	2012	
8	Coral Sea Marine Park	Australia	Coral Sea	989,836	2018	
9	Protection zone around the French Southern Territories National Nature Reserve	France	French Southern and Antarctic Lands	989,787	2017	
10	Northeast Greenland National Park	Greenland	Northeast Greenland	972,000	1974	
11	Steller Sea Lion Protection Areas	United States	Alaska	869,206	2002	
12	Pitcairn Islands Marine Reserve	United Kingdom	Pitcairn Islands	834,334	2016	
13	British Indian Ocean Territory Marine Protected Area	United Kingdom	British Indian Ocean Territory (disputed by Mauritius)	640,000	2010	
14	Rapa Nui Marine and Coastal Protected Area	Chile	Rapa Nui	579,368	2018	
15	Palau National Marine Sanctuary	Palau	Palau	502,538	2015	
16	Kermadec Benthic Protection Area	New Zealand	Kermadec Islands	469,276	2007	
17	Ascension Exclusive Economic Zone	United Kingdom	Ascension Island	440,000	2019	
18	Phoenix Islands Protected Area	Kiribati	Phoenix Islands	408,250	2006	
19	Trindade and Martin Vaz Archipelago Environmental Protection Area	Brazil	Trindade and Martin Vaz	403,848	2018	
20	Pacific Biosphere Reserve	Mexico	Eastern Pacific Ocean	390,091	2016	
21	Saint Peter and Saint Paul Archipelago Environmental Protection Area	Brazil	Saint Peter and Saint Paul Archipelago	384,565	2018	
22	Great Barrier Reef Marine Park	Australia	Great Barrier Reef	348,700	1981	
23	Offshore Trap/Pot Waters Area	United States	Western Atlantic Ocean	336,101	1997	
24	Tuvaijuittuq Marine Protected Area	Canada	Ellesmere Island	319,411	2019	
25	Nazca-Desventuradas Marine Park	Chile	Desventuradas Islands	300,035	2016	
26	Cerrado Biosphere Reserve	Brazil	Goiás, Maranhão, Piauí, Tocantins, and Federal District	296,525	1994	
27	Atlantic Forest Biosphere Reserve	Brazil	Atlantic Forest (15 states)	294,734	1993	
28	Pantanal Biosphere Reserve	Brazil	Goiás, Mato Grosso, and Mato Grosso do Sul	251,569	2000	

== See also ==
- List of marine protected areas
