= Palau National Marine Sanctuary =

Protected area in Palau

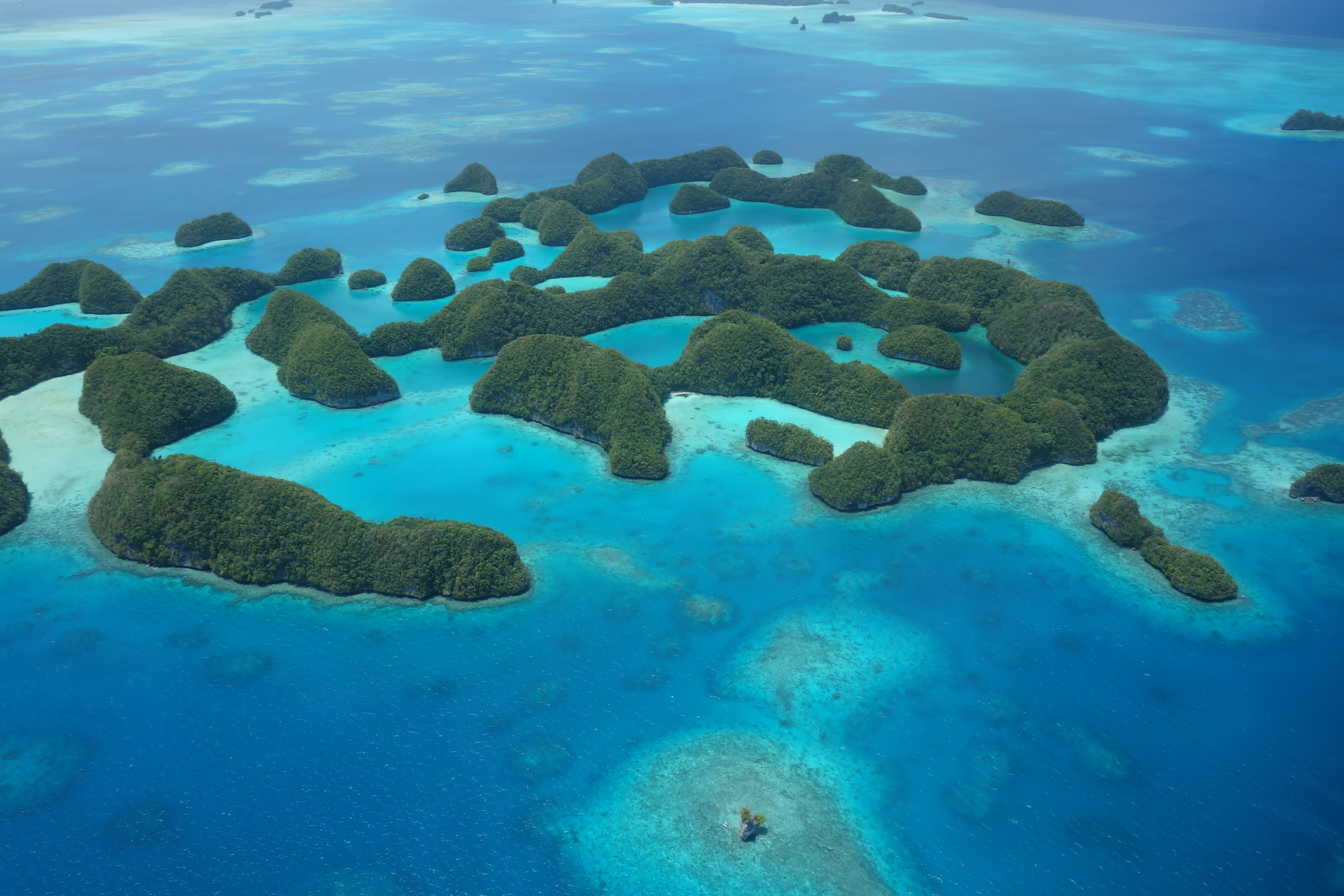
Ngerukewid

Palau National Marine Sanctuary is a marine protected area in Palau established in 2015. It covers an area of 502,538.78 km^{2} (194,031.31 sq mi), with all extractive activities including commercial fishing and mining prohibited from 80% of this area, and domestic fisheries permitted in the remaining 20%. It is one of the world's largest protected areas. It was cited at the United Nations Ocean Conference as "one of the world’s most ambitious ocean conservation initiatives".

The implementation of the no-take zone came into effect in 2020 after a five-year phase out plan. Enforcement is covered by rangers and Marine Law Enforcement boats. Established by the government of Thomas Remengesau Jr. in 2015, proposals were made to shrink the total size of the protected area in 2021 and 2024 by subsequent governments owing to the economic costs of reduced commercial fishing.

== See also ==
- List of marine protected areas
