= Aliwal Shoal Marine Protected Area =

Marine conservation area at Aliwal Shoal off the coast of KwaZulu-Natal, South Africa

- Aliwal Shoal MPA location
- Location: South coast of kwaZulu-Natal, South Africa
- Nearest city: Umkomaas and Scottburgh
- Coordinates: 30°15′S 31°00′E
- Area: 670 km^{2} (260 sq mi)
- Established: 2004, 2018
- Governing body: ??
- Aliwal Shoal Marine Protected Area (South Africa)

The Aliwal Shoal Marine Protected Area is a coastal and offshore marine protected area between the Lovu and Mzimayi estuaries, off the KwaZulu-Natal South Coast, South Africa. The MPA contains the popular scuba diving destination Aliwal Shoal

== History ==
The MPA was established in 1991 and proclaimed by the Minister of Environmental Affairs and Tourism, (Marthinus van Schalkwyk, in Government Gazette No. 26431 of 4 June 2004 in terms of section 43 of the) Marine Living Resources Act, 18 of 1998. The Aliwal Shoal MPA was extended by the addition of the large Aliwal Shoal Offshore Marine Protected Area in 2018/2019.

== Purpose ==
A marine protected area is defined by the IUCN as "A clearly defined geographical space, recognised, dedicated and managed, through legal or other effective means, to achieve the long-term conservation of nature with associated ecosystem services and cultural values".

== Extent ==
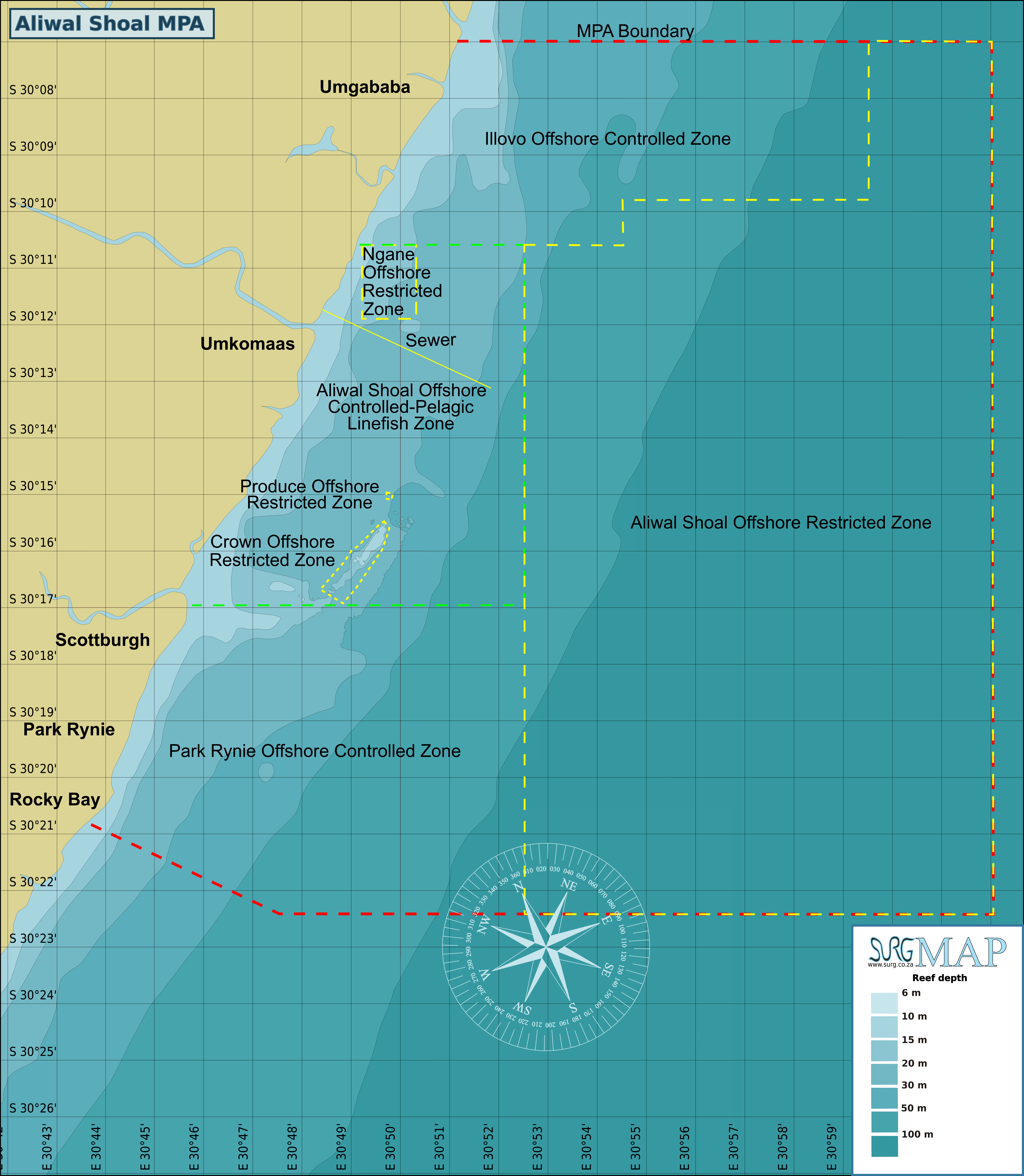
Map of the extent of the Aliwal Shoal Marine Protected Area showing zonation and bathymetry

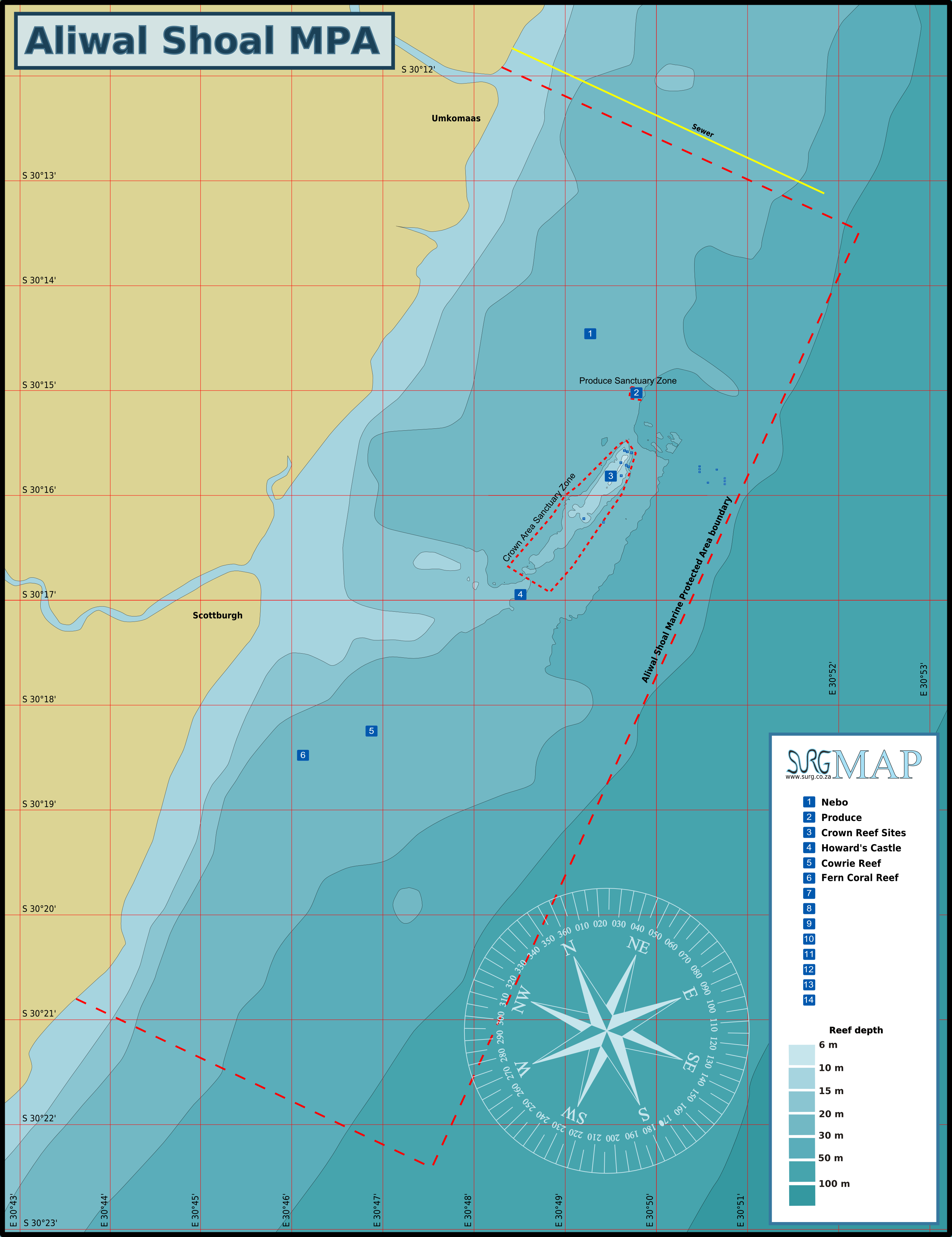
Bathymety of the older parts of the Aliwal Shoal MPA

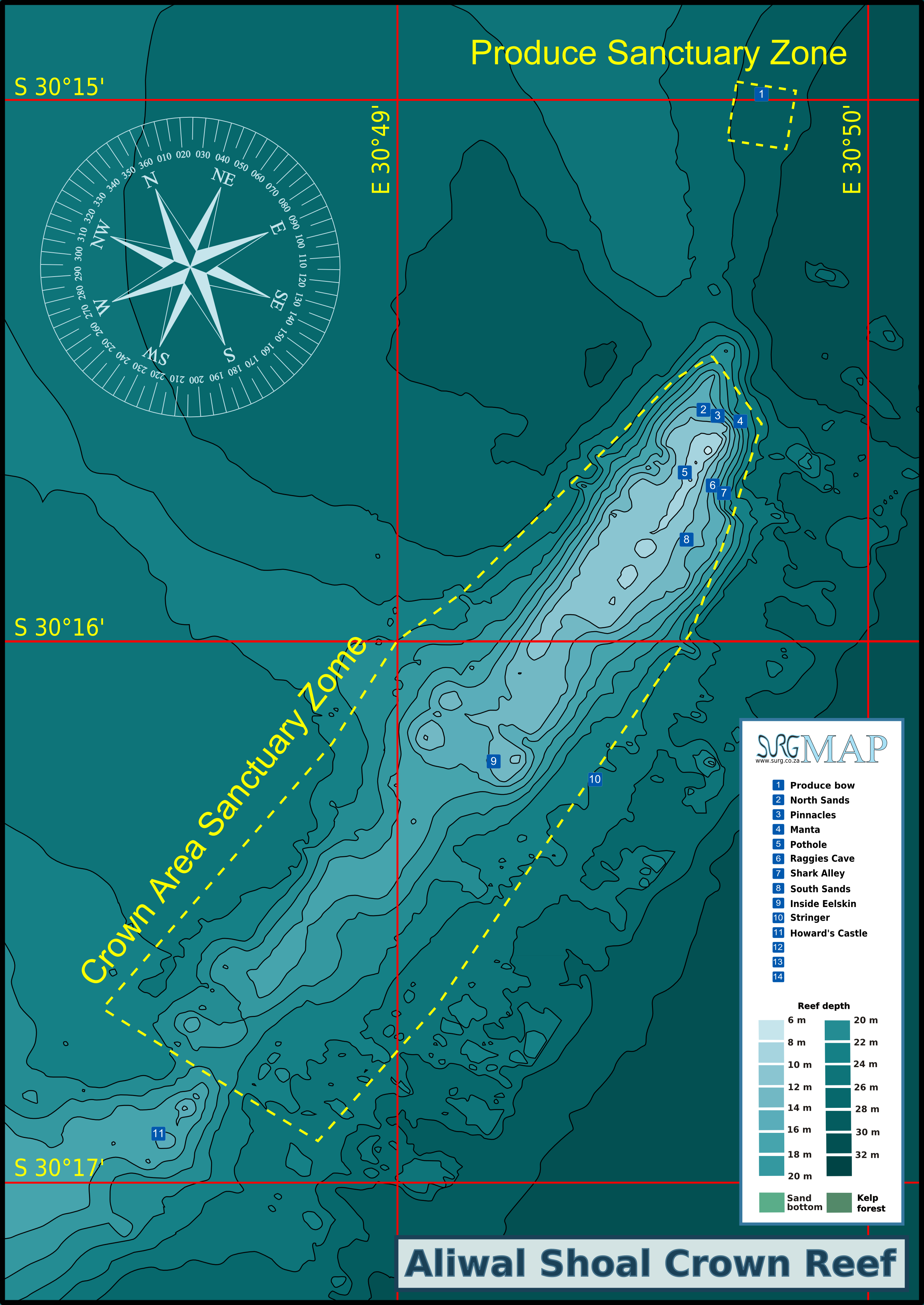
Bathymetry of the Crown area and Produce restricted zones.

The protected area includes the seabed, subsoil and water column inside the boundaries. Length of coastline protected since 2004 is 18,30 km The area of ocean protected previous to the 2018 extension was 126 km^{2}. now 670 km^{2}.

=== Zonation ===
The MPA is divided into an inshore and an offshore area. It is further subdivided into an offshore controlled-pelagic zone, two offshore controlled zones, an inshore controlled zone, an inshore restricted zone, four offshore restricted zones and two inshore sanctuary zones.

=== Boundaries ===
The borders of the MPA are:

- Northern boundary from S30°7.000′ E30°51.154′ to S30°7.000′ E31°2.000′
- Eastern boundary from S30°7.000′ E31°2.000′ to S30°22.412′ E31°2.000′
- Southern boundary from S30°22.412′ E31°2.000′ to S30°22.410′ E30°47.530′
- South-western boundary from S30°22.410′ E30°47.530′ to S30°20.816′ E30°43.640′
- Western boundary from S30°20.816′ E30°43.640′ to S30°7.000′ E30°51.154′ along the high-water mark.

==== Restricted zones ====
Aliwal Shoal inshore restricted zone:

- Part of the intertidal portion of the Aliwal Shoal Marine Protected Area from S30°14.420’, E30°47.071’ to S30°16.193’, E30°45.814’ between the high water mark and the five meter depth contour.

Aliwal Shoal offshore restricted zone (ASORZ):

- Northern boundary: S30°10.601', E30°52.5′ to S30°10.601', E30°54.498′; S30°9.8', E30°54.498′ to S30°9.8′ E30°52.5’ and S30°7.0’, E30°52.5’ to S30°7.0’, E31°2’
- Eastern boundary: S30°7.0’, E31°2’ to S30°22.412’, E31°2’
- Southern boundary: S30°22.412’, E31°2’ to S30°22.412’, E30°52.5’
- Western boundary: S30°22.412’, E30°52.5’ to S30°10.601', E30°52.5′; S30°10.601', E30°54.498′ to S30°9.8', E30°54.498′ and S30°9.8′ E30°52.5’ to S30°7.0’, E30°52.5’

Ngane Offshore Restricted Zone (NORZ):

- Northern boundary: S30°10.8’, E30°49.2’ to S30°10.8’, E30°50.3’
- Eastern boundary: S30°10.8’, E30°50.3’ to S30°11.9’, E30°50.3’
- Southern boundary: S30°11.9’, E30°50.3’ to S30°11.9’, E30°49.2’
- Western boundary: S30°11.9’, E30°49.2’ to S30°10.8’, E30°49.2’

Produce Offshore Restricted Zone (PORZ):

- Northern boundary: S30°14.968′, E30°49.723′ to S30°14.985′, E30°49.846′
- Eastern boundary: S30°14.985′, E30°49.846′ to S30°15.093′, E30°49.827′
- Southern boundary: S30°15.093′, E30°49.827′ to S30°15.076′, E30°49.703′
- Western boundary: S30°15.076′, E30°49.703′ to S30°14.968′, E30°49.723′

Crown Offshore Restricted Zone (CORZ) is enclosed by twelve line segments between waypoints which lie on the 25 meter isobath.

- S30°15.600′, E30°49.776′ to S30°15.791′, E30°49.714′
- S30°15.791′, E30°49.714′ to S30°15.982′, E30°49.627′
- S30°15.982′, E30°49.627′ to S30°15.982′, E30°49.627′
- S30°16.270′, E30°49.409′ to S30°16.270′, E30°49.409′
- S30°16.673′, E30°49.078′ to S30°16.673′, E30°49.078′
- S30°16.926′, E30°48.835′ to S30°16.926′, E30°48.835′
- S30°16.800′, E30°48.600′ to S30°16.800′, E30°48.600′
- S30°16.680′, E30°48.376′ to S30°16.680′, E30°48.376′
- S30°16.189′, E30°48.834′ to S30°16.189′, E30°48.834′
- S30°15.908′, E30°49.143′ to S30°15.908′, E30°49.143′
- S30°15.518′, E30°49.589′ to S30°15.518′, E30°49.589′
- S30°15.474′, E30°49.671′ to S30°15.474′, E30°49.671′

==== Controlled zones ====
Aliwal Shoal inshore controlled zone is the rest of the high-water to five metre isobath inshore portion of the MPA excepting the two sanctuary zones and the restricted zone.

Aliwal Shoal controlled-pelagic zone:

- Northern boundary: S30°8.5’, E30° 50.33’ to S30°8.5’, E30°52.5’
- Eastern boundary: S30°8.5’, E30°52.5’ to S30°17.3’, E30°52.5’
- Southern boundary: S30°17.3’, E30°52.5’ to S30°17.3’, E30°45.586’
- Western boundary S30°17.3’, E30°45.586’ to S30°8.5’, E30° 50.33’

Aliwal Shoal controlled zone 1:

- Northern boundary* S30°7’, E30°51.154’ to S31°7’, E31°2’
- Eastern boundary: S31°7’, E31°2’ to S30°8.5’, E31°2’
- Southern boundary: S30°8.5’, E31°2’ to S30°8.5’, E30°52.5’ to S30°8.5’, E30°50.33’
- Western boundary: S30°8.5’, E30°50.33’ to S30°7’, E30°51.154’ along the five metre depth contour.

Aliwal Shoal controlled zone 2

- Northern boundary: S30°17.3’, E30°45.586’ to S30°17.3’, E30°52.5’
- Eastern boundary: S30°17.3’, E30°52.5’ to S30°22.412’, E30°52.5’
- Southern boundary: S30°22.412’, E30°52.5’ to S30°47’, E30°22’
- Southwestern boundary: S30°47’, E30°22’ to S30°48’, E30°11.9’
- Western boundary: S30°48’, E30°11.9’ to S30°17.3’, E30°45.586’ along the five metre depth contour.

==== Sanctuary zones ====
Aliwal Shoal inshore sanctuary zone 1:

- Part of the intertidal portion of the Aliwal Shoal Marine Protected Area, from S30°13.464’, E30°47.694’ to S30°14.420’, E30°47.071’ between the high water mark and the five metre depth contour.

Aliwal Shoal inshore sanctuary zone 2:

- Part of the intertidal portion of the Aliwal Shoal Marine Protected Area, from S30°20.404’, E30°44.003’ to S30°20.807’, E30°43.618’ between the high water mark and the five meter depth contour.

== Management ==
The marine protected areas of South Africa are the responsibility of the national government, which has management agreements with a variety of MPA management authorities, in this case, Ezemvelo KZN Wildlife, which manages the MPA with funding from the SA Government through the Department of Environmental Affairs (DEA).

The Department of Agriculture, Forestry and Fisheries is responsible for issuing permits, quotas and law enforcement.

== Use ==
=== Activities requiring a permit ===
==== Fishing ====
The game and bait fish that be caught in the controlled-pelagic zone of the MPA are in the following families, and all species in these families may be caught.

Pelagic gamefish species:

- Carangidae
- Coryphaenidae
- Istiophoridae
- Pomatomidae
- Rachycentridae
- Scombridae
- Sphyraenidae
- Xiphiidae

Pelagic baitfish species:

- Atherinidae
- Belonidae
- Chirocentridae
- Clupeidae
- Engraulidae
- Exocoetidae
- Hemiramphidae
- Scomberesocidae

==== Scuba diving ====
Operating a recreational scuba diving business in the MPA requires a permit.

===== Named dive sites =====
The MPA has a large number of rocky reef and wreck recreational dive sites which have been identified by position and named:

- Cathedral 30.2644°S 30.8276°E
- Eelskin Ridge 30.2634°S 30.8236°E
- Fern Coral reef 30.308°S 30.768°E
- Howard's Castle 30.282°S 30.808°E
- Inside Eelskin 30.2704°S 30.8201°E
- Manta Point 30.2599°S 30.8288°E
- Northern Pinnacles 30.2616°S 30.8280°E
- North Sands 30.2595°S 30.8275°E
- Pinnacles 30.2597°S 30.8280°E
- Pinnacles 30.2597°S 30.8280°E
- Produce wreck 30.2498°S 30.8296°E
- Raggies Cave 30.2619°S 30.8279°E
- Shark Alley 30.2621°S 30.8283°E
- South Sands 30.2636°S 30.8269°E
- Stringer 30.2710°S 30.8237°E

== Ecology ==
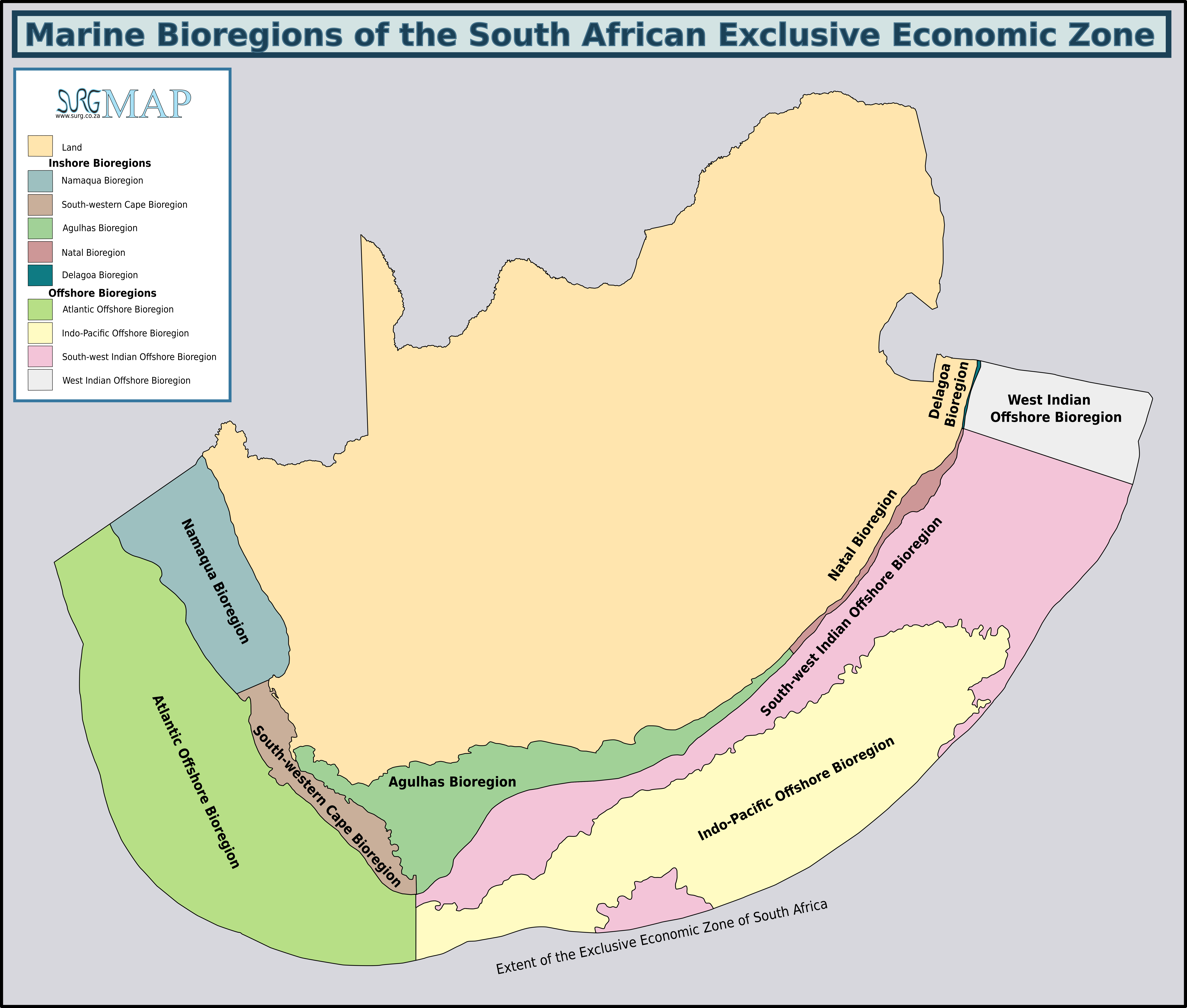
Marine bioregions of the South African Exclusive Economic Zone: Aliwal Shoal Marine Protected Area is in the Natal coastal bioregion.

(describe position, biodiversity and endemism of the region) The MPA is in the warm temperate Natal inshore marine bioregion to the north-east of the Mbashe River.

Four major habitats exist in the sea in this region, distinguished by the nature of the substrate. The substrate, or base material, is important in that it provides a base to which an organism can anchor itself, which is vitally important for those organisms which need to stay in one particular kind of place. Rocky shores and reefs provide a firm fixed substrate for the attachment of plants and animals. Sandy beaches and bottoms are a relatively unstable substrate and cannot anchor many of the other benthic organisms. Finally there is open water, above the substrate and clear of the kelp forest, where the organisms must drift or swim. Mixed habitats are also frequently found, which are a combination of those mentioned above. There are no significant estuarine habitats in the MPA.

Rocky shores and reefs There are rocky reefs and mixed rocky and sandy bottoms. For many marine organisms the substrate is another type of marine organism, and it is common for several layers to co-exist. Examples of this are red bait pods, which are usually encrusted with sponges, ascidians, bryozoans, anemones, and gastropods, and abalone, which are usually covered by similar seaweeds to those found on the surrounding rocks, usually with a variety of other organisms living on the seaweeds.

The type of rock of the reef is of some importance, as it influences the range of possibilities for the local topography, which in turn influences the range of habitats provided, and therefore the diversity of inhabitants. Sandstone and other sedimentary rocks erode and weather very differently, and depending on the direction of dip and strike, and steepness of the dip, may produce reefs which are relatively flat to very high profile and full of small crevices. These features may be at varying angles to the shoreline and wave fronts. There are fewer large holes, tunnels and crevices in sandstone reefs, but often many deep but low near-horizontal crevices.

Coral reefs

Sedimentary beaches and bottoms (including mud, sand, shelly, pebble and gravel bottoms) Sedimentary bottoms at first glance appear to be fairly barren areas, as they lack the stability to support many of the spectacular reef based species, and the variety of large organisms is relatively low. The sediment is continually being moved around by wave action, to a greater or lesser degree depending on weather conditions and exposure of the area. This means that sessile organisms must be specifically adapted to areas of relatively loose substrate to thrive in them, and the variety of species found on a sandy or gravel bottom will depend on all these factors. unconsolidated sedimentary bottoms have one important compensation for their instability, animals can burrow into the sediment and move up and down within its layers, which can provide feeding opportunities and protection from predation. Other species can dig themselves holes in which to shelter, or may feed by filtering water drawn through the tunnel, or by extending body parts adapted to this function into the water above the sand.

The open sea

=== Marine species diversity ===
==== Animals ====
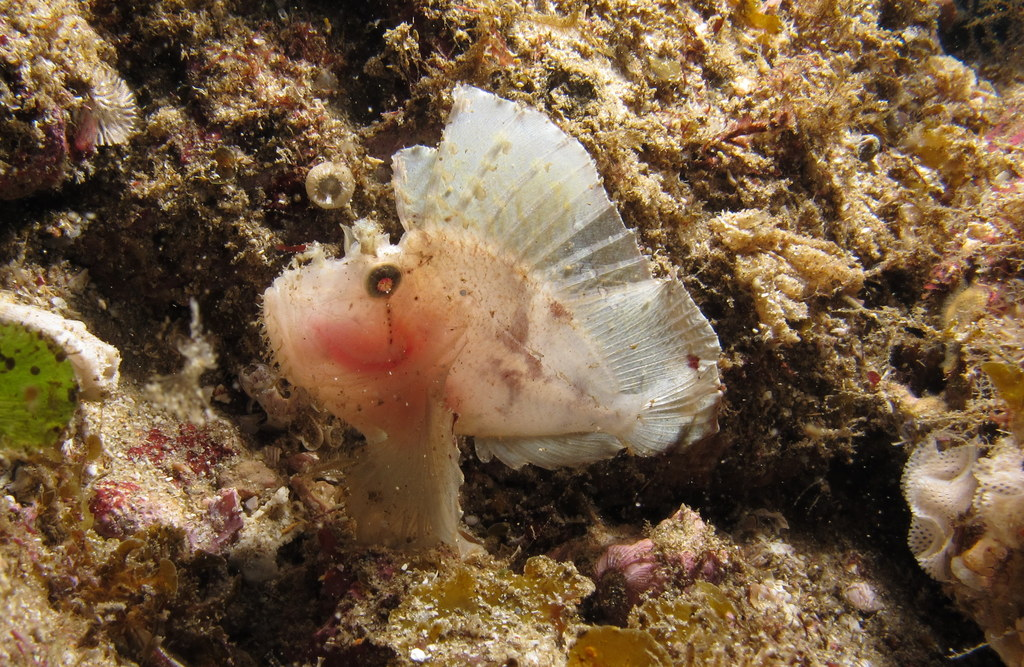
Paperfish

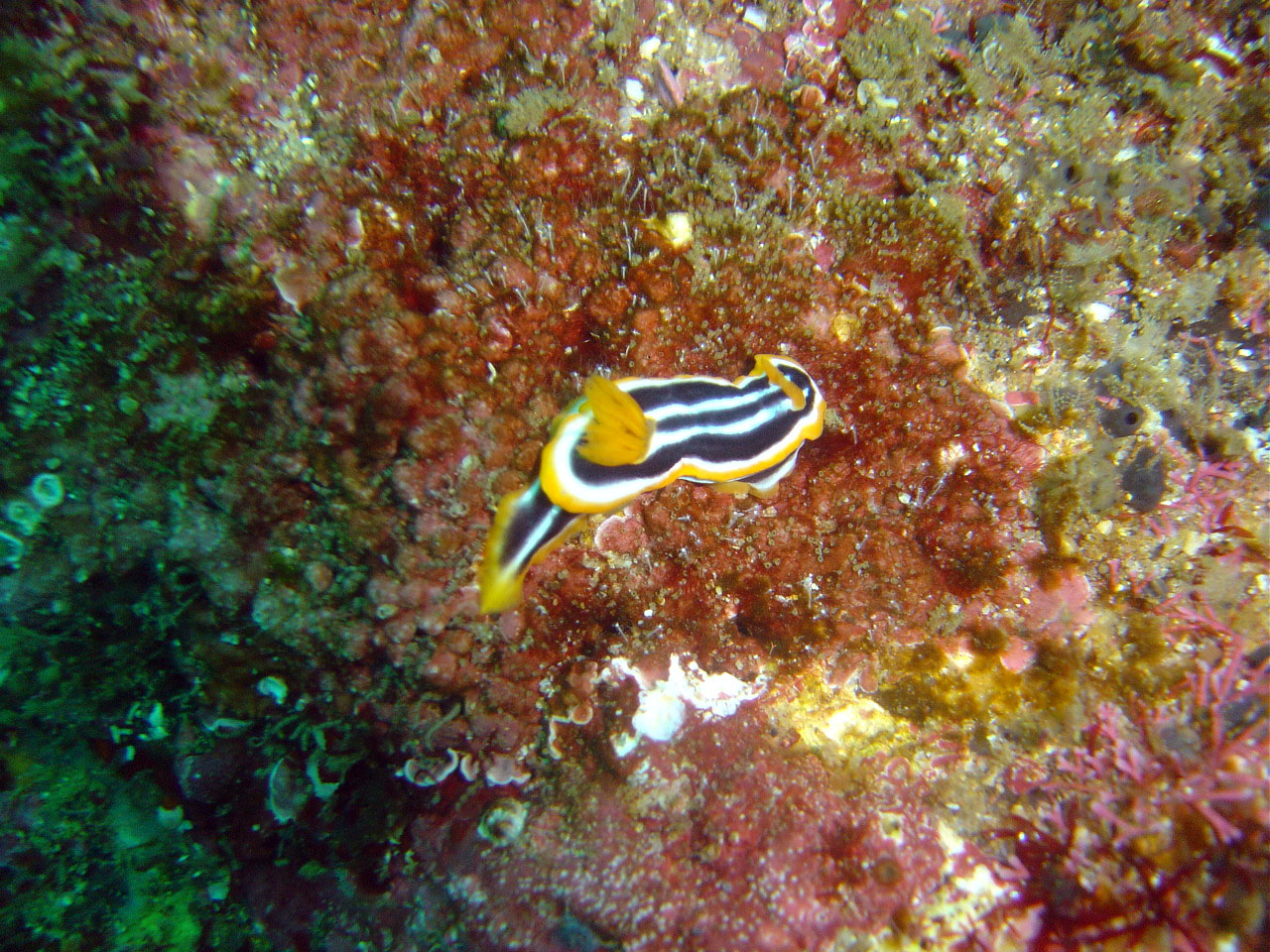
Nudibranch Chromodoris africana

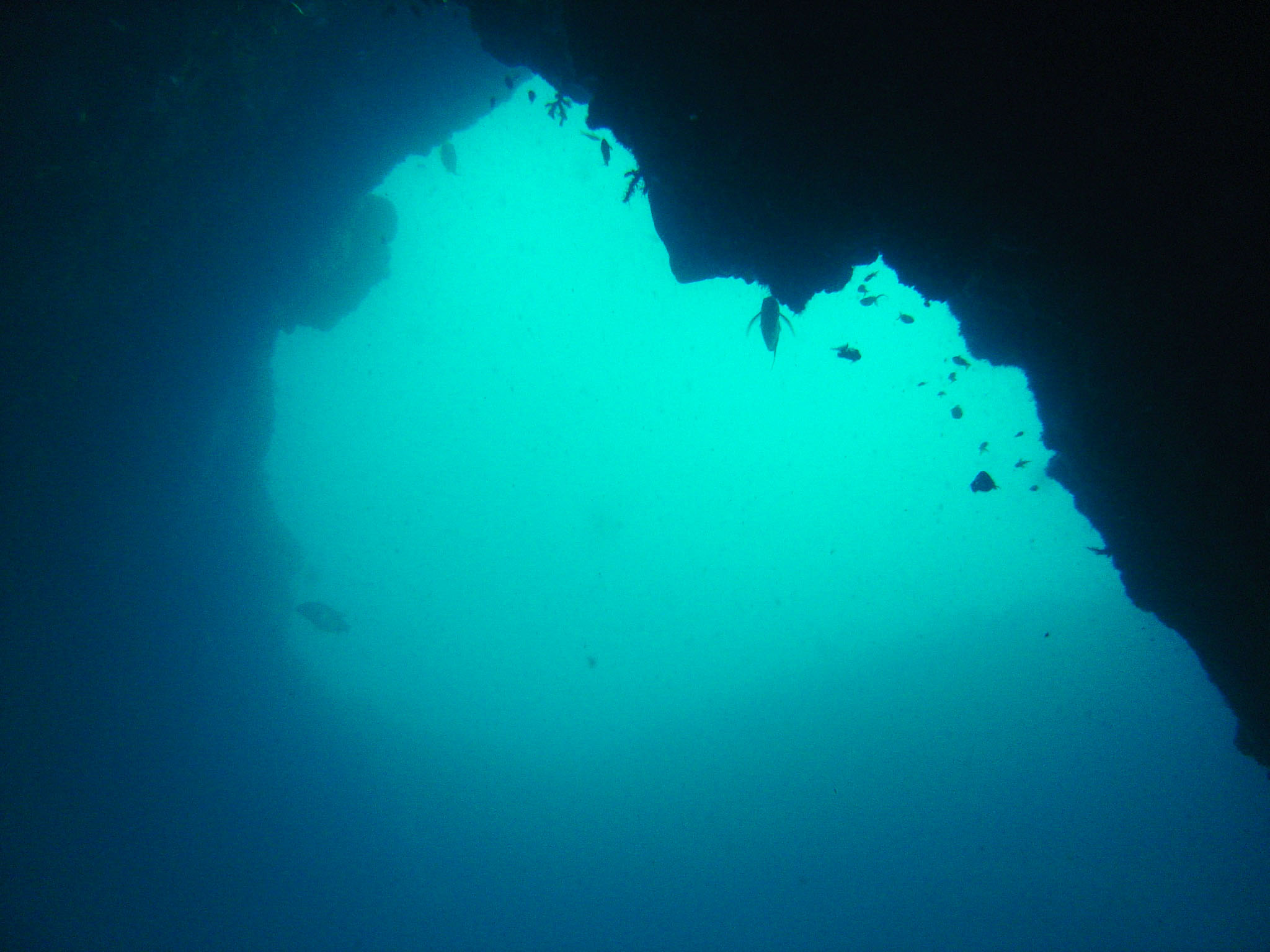
The natural arch at Cathedral dive site

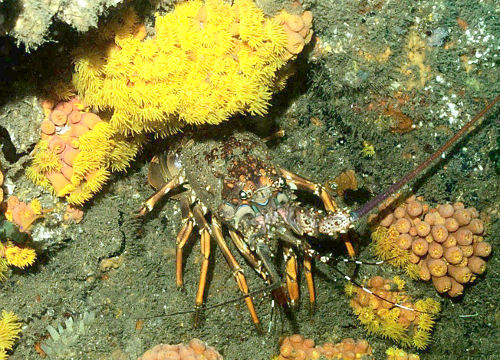
Natal ornate spiny lobster among turret corals

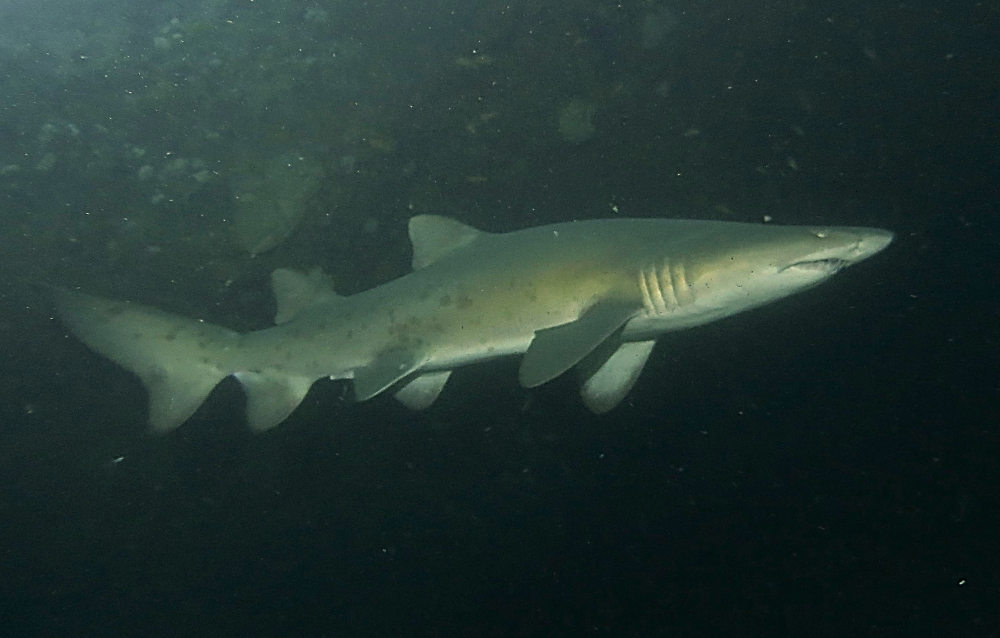
Ragged-tooth shark

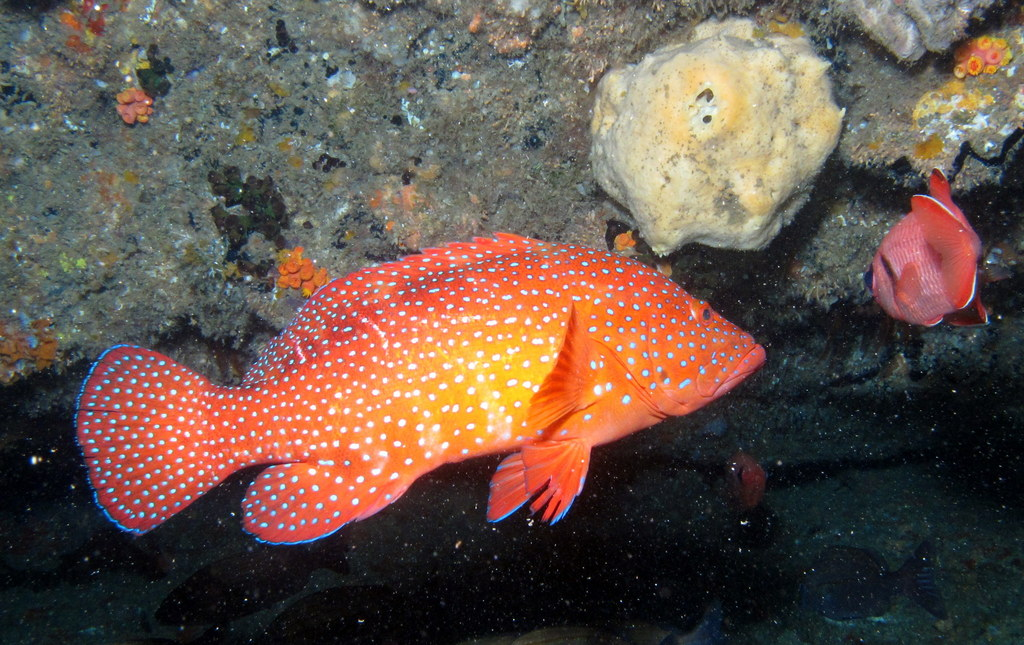
Coral rockcod Cephalopholis miniata

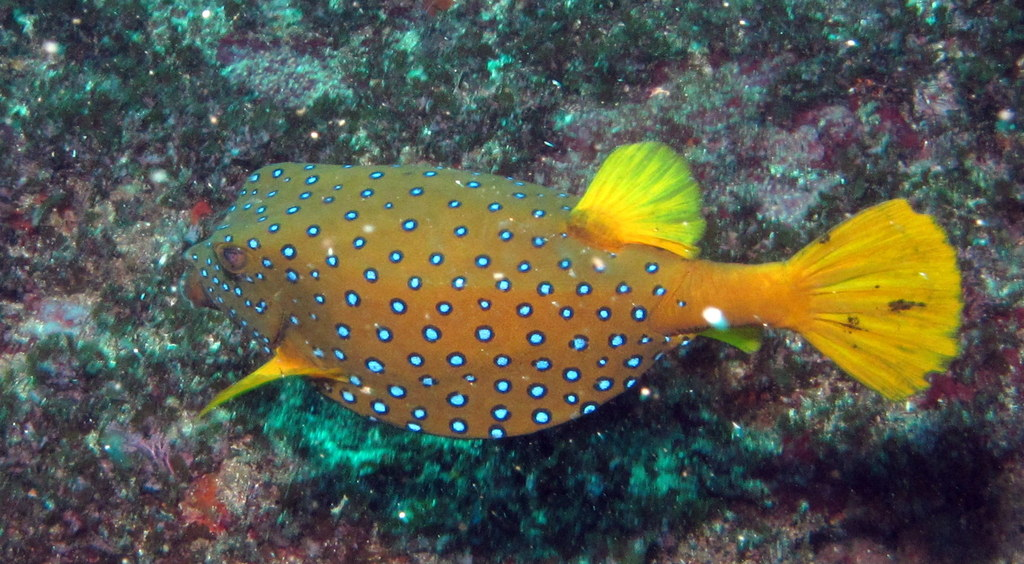
Boxy Ostracion cubicus

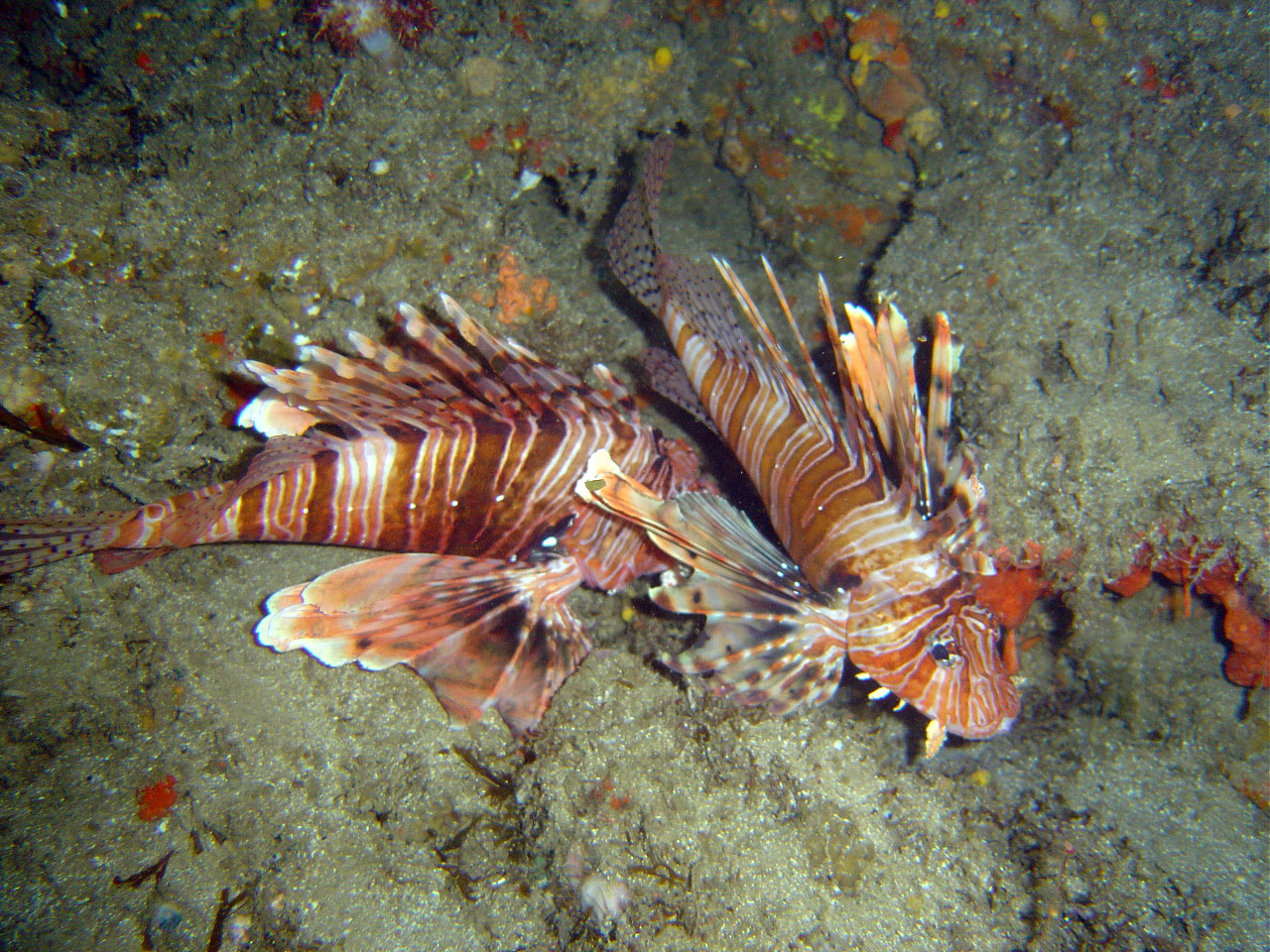
Firefish Pterois miles

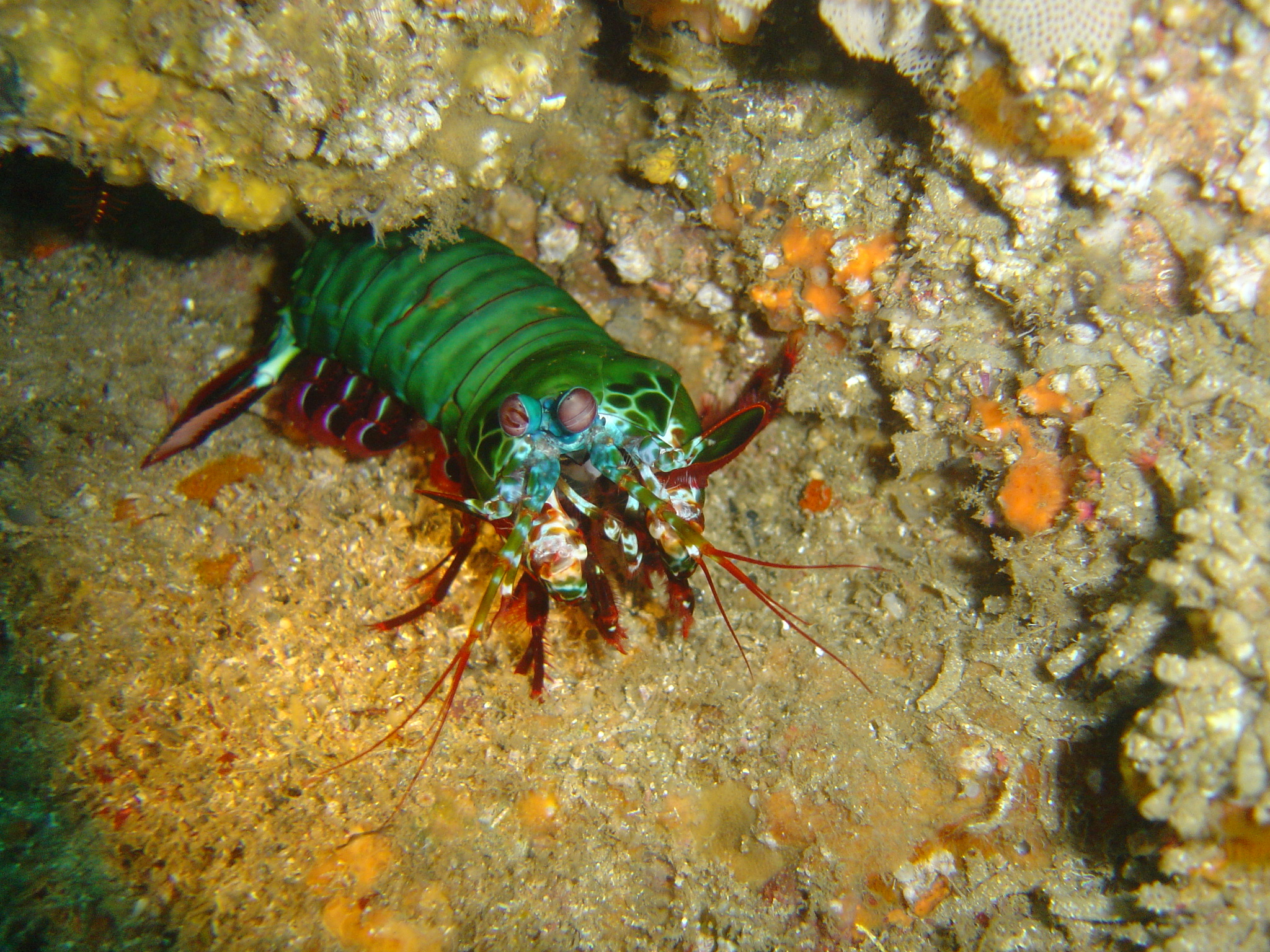
Peacock mantis shrimp

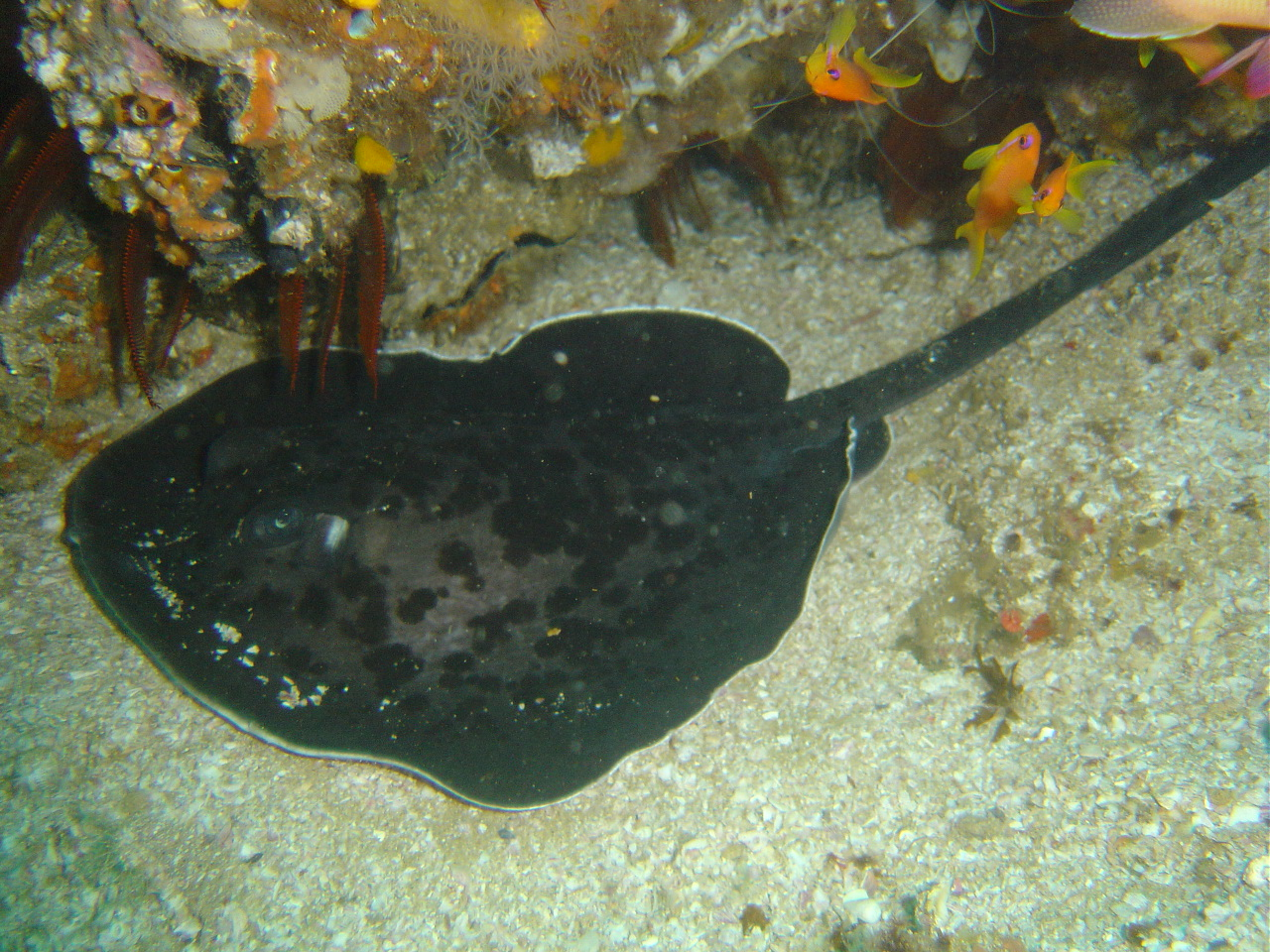
Round ribbontail ray

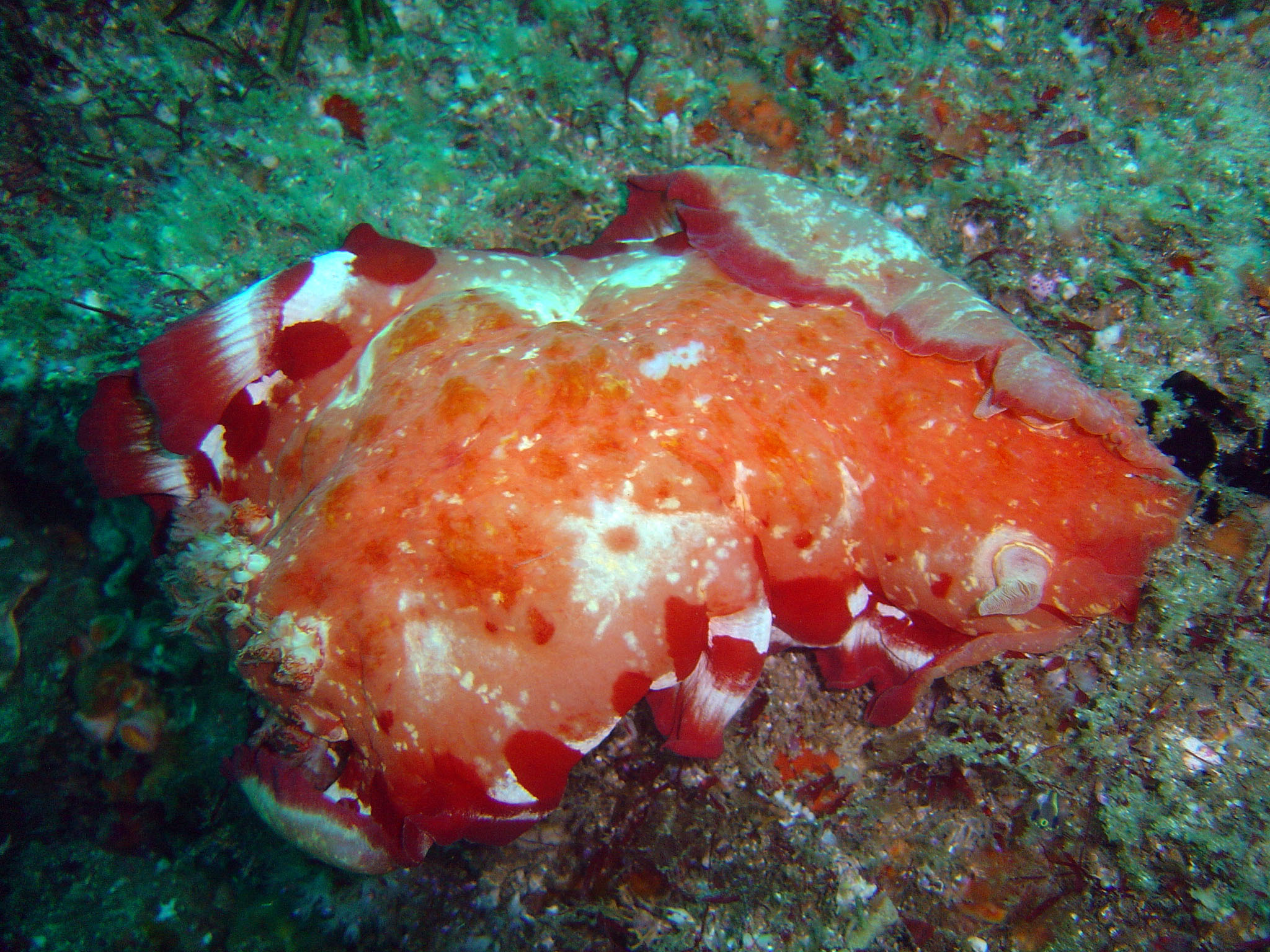
Spanish dancer nudibranch Hexabranchus sanguineus

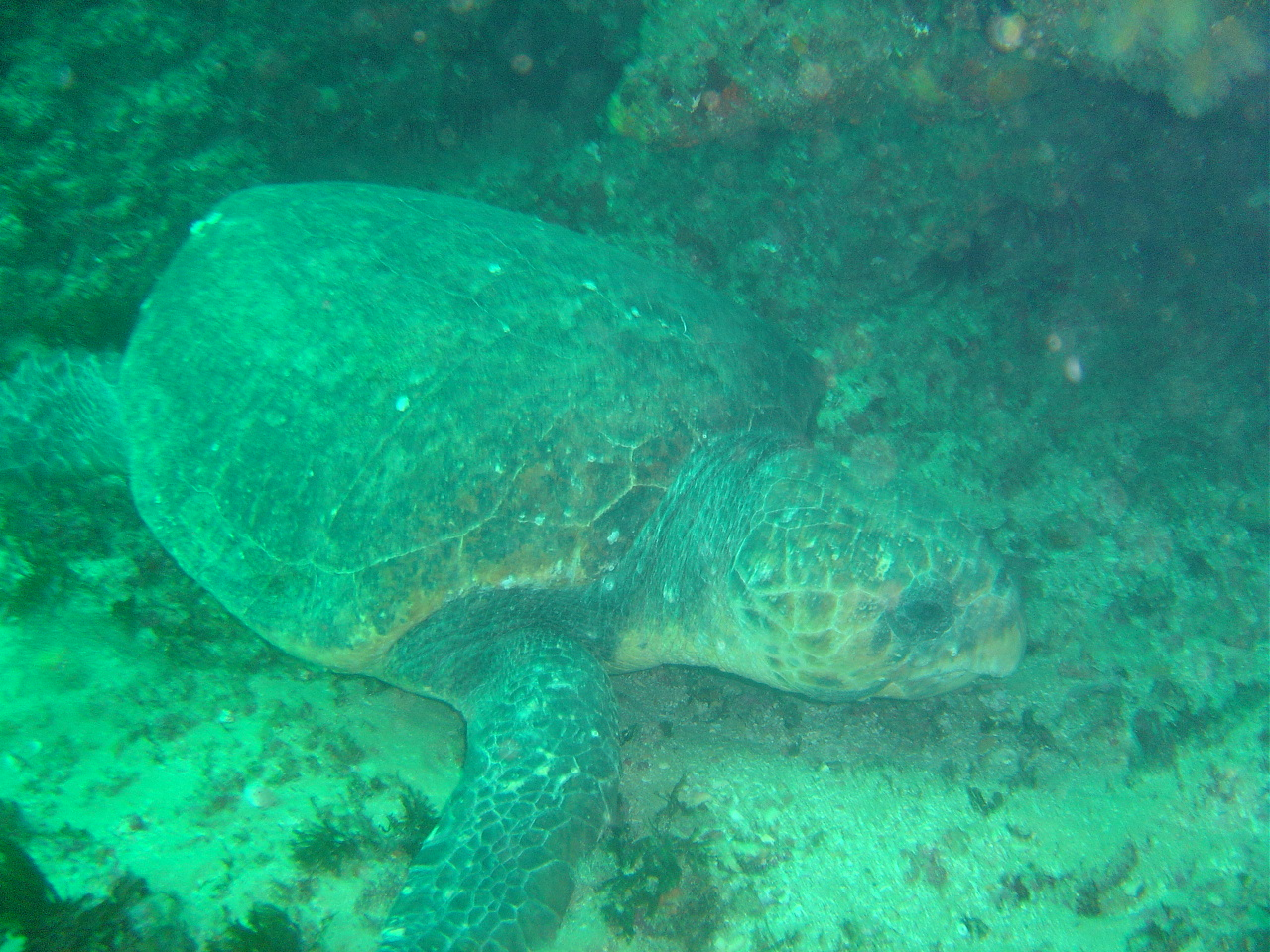
Turtle

==== Seaweeds ====
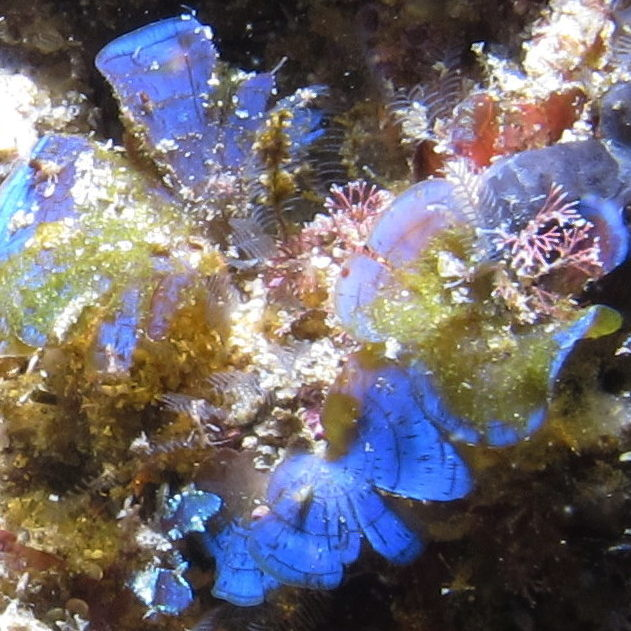
Iridescent blues of a Dictotalean brown alga

== Slipways and harbours in the MPA ==
There are no harbours in the MPA. Boats are launched directly into the sea from the beach, or when conditions allow, may be launched in a river and navigated through the river mouth.

== See also ==
Marine protected areas of South Africa
- List of protected areas of South Africa
- Marine protected areas of South Africa – Protected areas of coastline or ocean in the EEZ of South Africa
