= Cabrillo State Marine Reserve =

Marine protected area on California's coast

Cabrillo State Marine Reserve (SMR) is a marine protected area (MPA). It extends off Cabrillo National Monument in Point Loma, San Diego, on California's south coast. The SMR covers 0.38 square miles (0.98 km^{2}). Marine animal removal from the SMR's boundaries is restricted, safeguarding marine life.

Cabrillo SMR prohibits take of all living marine resources.

== History ==
Cabrillo SMR is one of 36 marine protected areas added by the California Fish and Game Commission in December, 2010 during the third phase of the Marine Life Protection Act Initiative. The MLPAI is a collaborative public process to create a statewide network of protected areas along California's coastline.

The south coast's new MPAs were designed by local divers, fishermen, conservationists and scientists who comprised the South Coast Regional Stakeholder Group. Their job was to design a network of protected areas that would preserve sensitive sea life and habitats while enhancing recreation, study and education opportunities.

The south coast marine protected areas went into effect in 2012.

== Geography ==
Boundary: This area is bounded by the mean high tide line and straight lines connecting the following points in the order listed:

1. 32°40.60′N 117°14.82′W
2. 32°40.60′N 117°15.00′W
3. 32°39.70′N 117°15.00′W
4. 32°39.70′N 117°14.30′W and
5. 32°40.00′N 117°14.30′W.

== Habitat and wildlife ==
Cabrillo SMR includes a section of Point Loma's dense and thriving kelp forest. Rocky and sandy beach and intertidal habitat, surf grass, and nearshore rock reefs are other habitats. It is adjacent and contiguous with Cabrillo National Monument, which protects and interprets for the public important California history and culture, including the site of Juan Cabrillo's journey to North America. This unique opportunity enhances the efficiency and effectiveness of managing the MPA through collaborative science, resources management and protection, law enforcement, education and outreach.

== Scientific monitoring ==
As specified by the Marine Life Protection Act, select marine protected areas along California's south coast are monitored by scientists to track their effectiveness and learn more about ocean health. Similar studies in MPAs located off of the Santa Barbara Channel Islands have detected gradual improvements in fish size and number.
