= Ascension Island Marine Protected Area =

Marine protected area in the Atlantic

- The protected area covers the entirety of the territorial waters and exclusive economic zone of Ascension Island
- Location: Saint Helena, Ascension and Tristan da Cunha
- Coordinates: 7°56′S 14°22′W
- Area: 443,571 km^{2} (171,264 sq mi)
- Established: 30 August 2019

The Ascension Island Marine Protected Area covers the entirety of the territorial waters and exclusive economic zone of the mid-Atlantic territory of Ascension Island. Within the area, no commercial fishing or deep sea mining is allowed, with recreational fishing allowed only in the territorial waters directly adjacent to the island.

Ascension Island is part of the Mid-Atlantic Ridge, and the protected area covers a number of underwater features such as seamounts and hydrothermal vents. Three major seamounts in the southern half of the protected area are significant areas of marine biodiversity, in addition to the waters surrounding the island itself. Marine species in these waters include endemic species and species that are otherwise associated with South America or Africa. The area also protects seabirds and green sea turtles that nest on the island.

The protected area was established in 2019 following a planning and consultation process that included the Ascension Island Council, local residents, the United Kingdom government, non-governmental organizations, and a philanthropic donor. The large size of the ocean covered means remote sensing plays a crucial role in monitoring, and the local government receives external financial support to effectively administer the area.

== Geography ==
Ascension Island is an isolated volcanic outcrop of the Mid-Atlantic Ridge with steep slopes

Ascension Island is an isolated 88-square-kilometre (34 sq mi) large volcanic island in the Atlantic Ocean. It rises from the sea floor as part of the Mid-Atlantic Ridge. The protected area covers the entirety of the island's territorial waters and exclusive economic zone. In total, 443,571 square kilometres (171,264 sq mi) are included, making it the 8th largest area of protected ocean. This area lies along the southern edge of the South Equatorial Current, which brings nutrient-rich water west from the Gulf of Guinea.

The southern half of the EEZ contains three major shallow-water seamounts, the Grattan Seamount, the Harris-Stewart Seamount, and Young Seamount. Grattan is 256 kilometres (159 mi) to the southeast, and peaks at 101 metres (331 ft) deep. Young is 315 kilometres (196 mi) to the southeast, and peaks at 77 metres (253 ft) deep. The water separating them reaches depths of 3,000 metres (9,800 ft). Harris-Stewart is 295 kilometres (183 mi) to the west, and has a large plateau at 500 metres (1,600 ft) deep from which a number of smaller peaks reach as high as 256 metres (840 ft) deep.

Many other seamounts are also found in the area, as well as four hydrothermal vents between 1,700 metres (5,600 ft) and 3,600 metres (11,800 ft) deep. Overall, the average depth is about 3,300 metres (10,800 ft).

== History ==
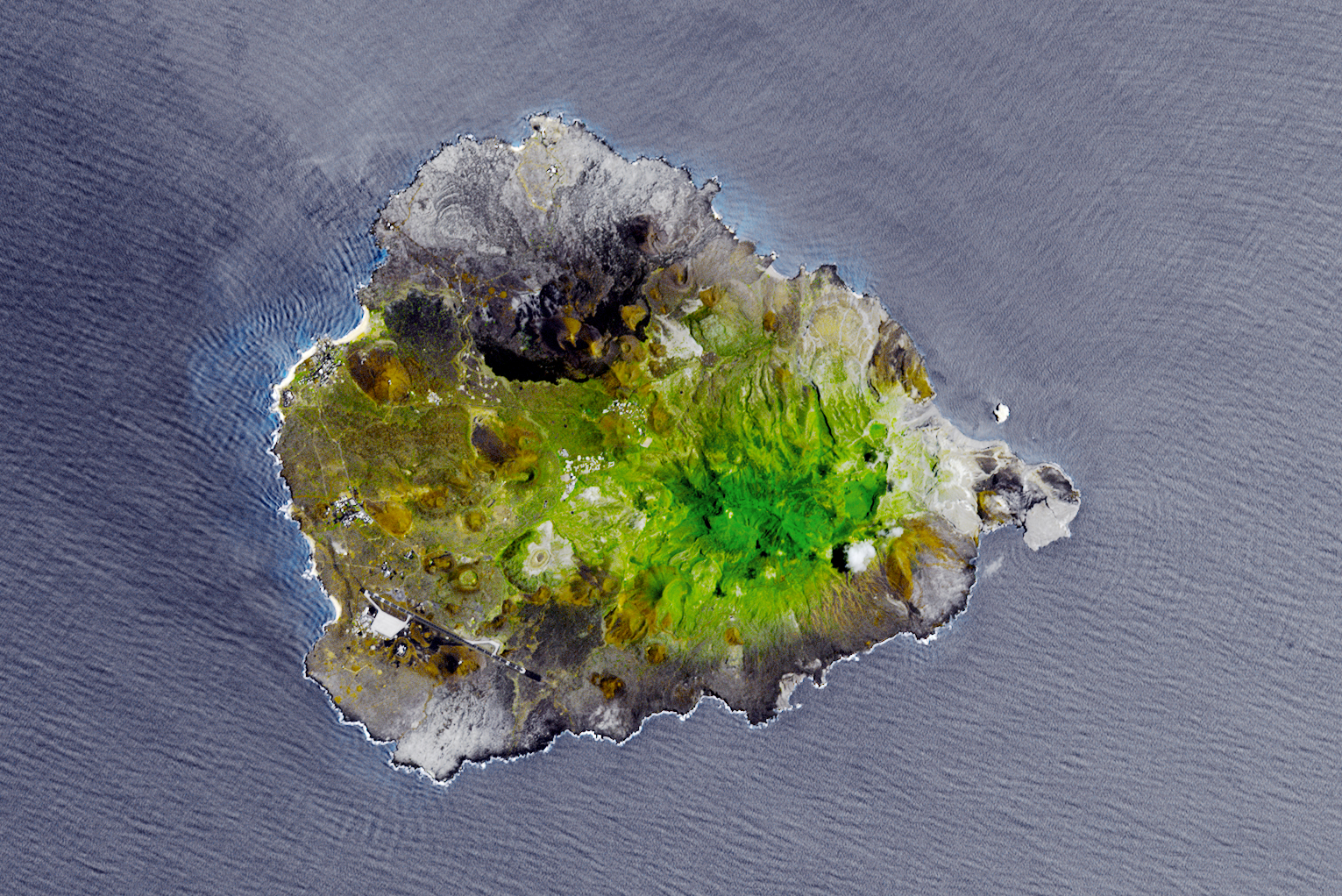
2020 satellite image of the island showing the main settlement of Georgetown on the west coast

Due to its isolation, the waters around Ascension Island have never been heavily fished. The first settlers arrived in 1815, introducing predators which hunted seabirds. Turtles nesting on the island were harvested until the 1930s, when the practice was banned. Feral cats were wiped out in 2009.

Commercial fishing in the EEZ was first licensed in 1988, with the cost of each licence equivalent to £8,000 at 2017 values. This cost increased over time. Commercial fisheries focused on bigeye tuna, which made up 74% of all catch. This and other species within the Ascension Island EEZ are thought to have been overfished. Most fishing occurred in the northwest of the EEZ, which was fished alongside adjacent international waters. The two main fishing fleets in this area are 60 mostly Taiwanese and Japanese longline fishing vessels and 29 mostly European purse seine vessels. Fishing was initially managed by the Government of Saint Helena, before a closure of the fishery from 2005 to 2009, as the Ascension Island fisheries management council developed its own system. Also beginning in 2005, the bigeye tuna fishery became subject to International Commission for the Conservation of Atlantic Tunas (ICCAT) regulations, putting a cap on the total amount of all Atlantic tuna that could be fished each year.

Preparations for a National Biodiversity Action Plan were initiated in 2012, although this focused mostly on terrestrial wildlife, seabirds, and turtles. The decline in seabird population did, however, prompt discussions about a marine protected area to ensure their diet was healthy. Concerns raised in 2012 by the Royal Society for the Protection of Birds about issuing fishing licences without having patrol boats and with little ability to enforce regulations led to a second closure from 2013 to 2014 as management was again reviewed. The number of fishing licences was highest in 1996, with 134 sold, and numbers decreased before the 2005 closure. Nonetheless, in 2011 they still provided 16% of the island's income.

The 2015 reopening limited commercial fishing to the northern half of the EEZ (above 8° South), more than 50 nautical miles (93 km; 58 mi) from the island. Recreational fishing was permitted within the 50 nautical mile limit. The cost of commercial fishing licences was set at £20,000, and licensed vessels were required to be registered with ICCAT. Only two licences were purchased from 2015 until the creation of the protected area, likely due to changes in tuna markets rather than the higher licence requirements and cost, although there are some indications that occasional illegal, unreported and unregulated fishing may have taken place during that time. The costs needed to create this 234,291 square kilometres (90,460 sq mi) protected area were paid for as a philanthropic action by Louis Bacon for the first 18 months, and through part of these funds the island obtained a patrol vessel.

Following up on the Conservative Party manifesto for the 2015 United Kingdom general election, in May 2015 the United Kingdom announced the Blue Belt Programme, which was intended to protect the waters of the British Overseas Territories. This was managed by the Centre for Environment, Fisheries and Aquaculture Science and the Marine Management Organisation. In January 2016, the United Kingdom announced that 50% of the island's waters would be protected under this policy, which would contribute to the global 30 by 30 goals. In November 2017, a coalition of non-governmental organizations pushed for a 2019 deadline to establish a protected area, receiving support from 285 British members of parliament.

Significant research on the environment was carried out by the Ascension Island Government to inform the creation of a protected area. Existing legislation protected only wildlife on land and within the island's territorial waters. Economic studies were also carried out, which found the cost of fisheries monitoring and enforcement would outweigh the potential income from selling licences, whereas in the case of a full closure, the ability of the ICCAT to prosecute violations would alleviate some enforcement costs. The initial focus on managing fishing expanded to preventing resource extraction, and ecological and cultural objectives were added.

In November 2018 the Ascension Island Council released research on three different proposals, which would protect different portions of the island's waters, for public consultation. An Inshore Fisheries Advisory Committee helped develop public engagement on local fishing around the island. The Council eventually proposed to protect all the island's waters, which the United Kingdom Government agreed to in its Spring Statement on 14 March 2019. An endowment fund worth over £2 million was created by Blue Marine Foundation for the area's management.

The Council recommended creating the marine protected area to Governor Philip Rushbrook, who officially designated it on 30 August 2019. A five-year management plan was established in September 2021, and legislative changes were undertaken to facilitate the plan's implementation.

== Biodiversity ==
Likely due to its isolation, there is a relative paucity in species diversity around Ascension Island compared to other Atlantic islands, although overall abundance is high. The central Atlantic location means there are species associated with both the eastern coast of South America and the western coast of Africa. Hotspots for pelagic species include not only the main island, but also underwater features such as seamounts.

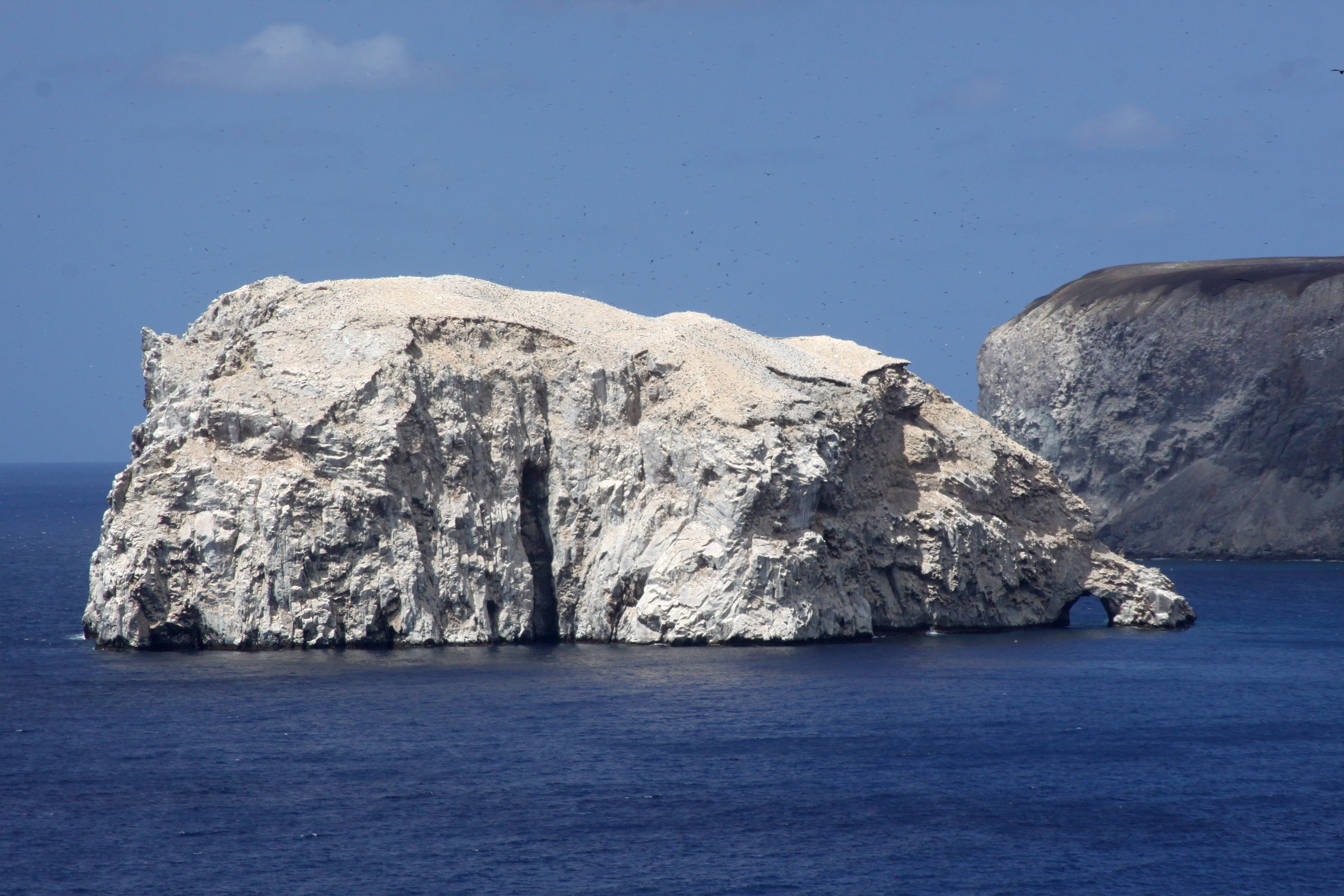
Boatswain Bird Island was an important refuge for Ascension Island's seabirds after predators were introduced to the main island

The island supports 11 species of seabirds, which total over 500,000 individuals. The Ascension frigatebird is endemic to the area. The small Boatswain Bird Island hosts important breeding populations of red-billed tropicbirds and masked boobies. The other species are the brown noddy, black noddy, sooty tern, white tern, white-tailed tropicbird, brown booby, red-footed booby, and band-rumped storm petrel.

It is thought there are 173 fish species in the protected area, 77% of which are found close to the shore. 11 of these are endemic, including the resplendent pygmy angelfish. 16 additional species are endemic to Ascension and Saint Helena. Other fish species present include marlin such as the Atlantic blue marlin and sailfish, swordfish, the Ascension goby, rock hind groupers, bigeye tuna, yellowfin tuna, skipjack tuna, albacore, spotted moray eels, jacks, and black triggerfish. Yellowfin tuna are not thought to spawn in the area. Shark species include the threatened blue sharks, oceanic whitetip sharks, and silky sharks, and more common species such as the Galapagos shark. Devil fish rays travel through the open ocean.

Endemic algae and invertebrates can be found in shallow waters around the island. Most of the 112 known algal taxa are found either on the eastern coast of South America, the western coast of Africa, or both. Endemic invertebrates include the Procaris ascensionis and Typhlatya rogersi shrimp, and a number of amphipods. Spiny lobster are found near the shoreline. Black triggerfish are thought to eat most accessible shallow-water algae, leaving just coralline algae like Lithothamnion glaciale and Lithophyllum species dominant in the shallow waters surrounding the island. Further down, there are deepwater reefs formed by Lophelia pertusa.

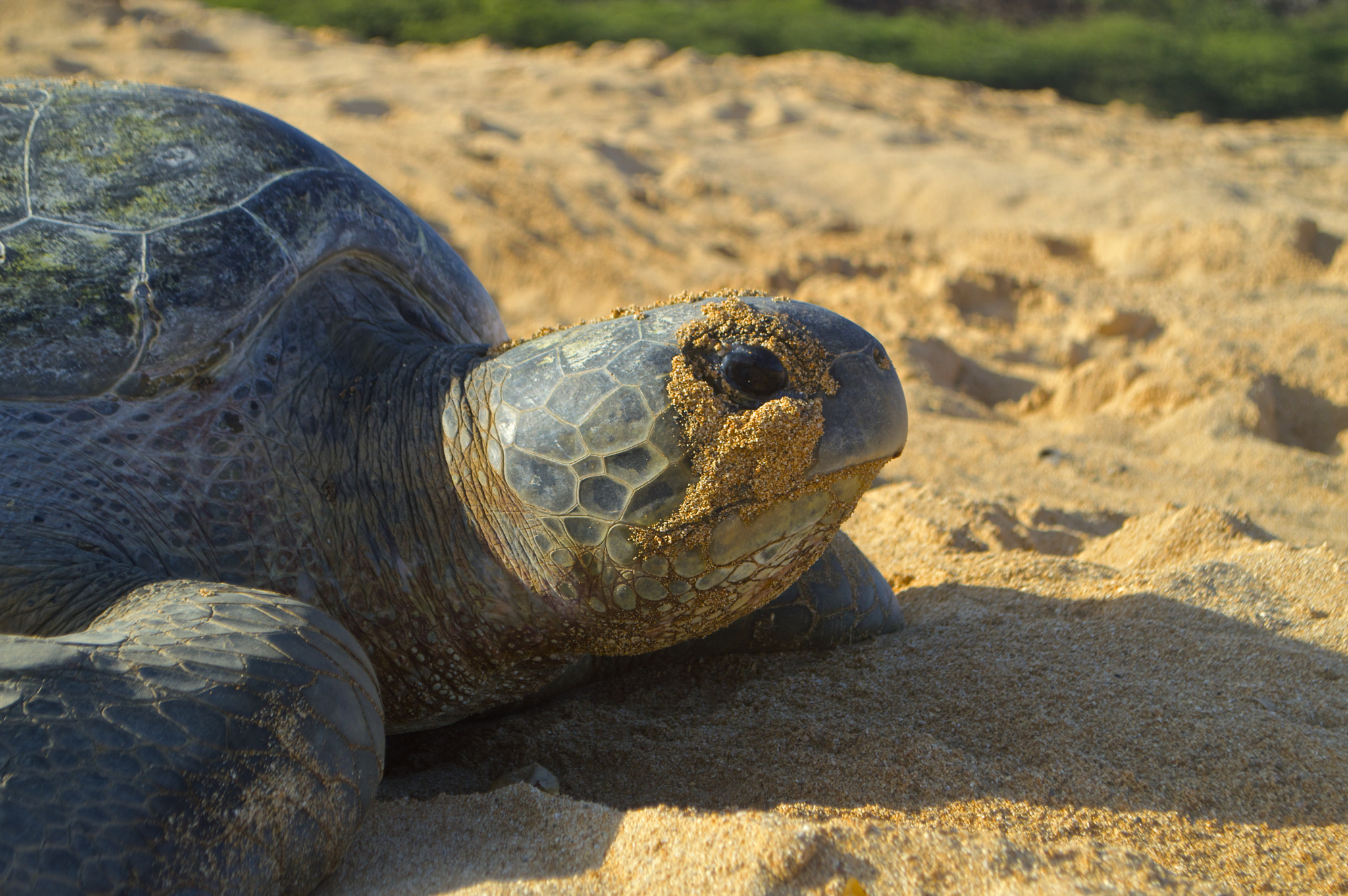
One of the many green sea turtles who nest on Ascension Island

The island has the second largest green sea turtle population in the Atlantic. These turtles feed in the Caribbean and off Brazil before returning to the island to nest. Hawksbill sea turtles are also found in the protected area, although they do not nest on the island. Humpback whales that migrate to the Southern Ocean each year mate and give birth in the area. Bottlenose dolphins, sperm whales, and Gervais's beaked whales are also present.

== Management ==
Commercial fishing and deep sea mining is banned. Recreational and sports fishing are allowed within the 12 nautical miles (22 km; 14 mi) territorial waters, which make up about 0.5% of the protected area. The Ascension Island government requires all ships that transit through its EEZ to register the catch they have on board, and maintain a regular speed.

The size of the protected area makes monitoring and management difficult. Management is expected to require UK government and philanthropic support, and to cost £150,000 per year including staff and a patrol boat. Monitoring of fishing vessels is in part carried out through remote sensing using satellites, and data is fed into an information portal that allows both for monitoring and for deeper research into the area. The South Atlantic Anomaly inhibits the effective use of Visible Infrared Imaging Radiometer Suite tools.

Climate change is recognised as a significant threat to the local environment. The island's waters are expected to become warmer, more acidic, and to have less surface phosphates.
