= Marae Moana =

Marine protected area in the Cook Islands

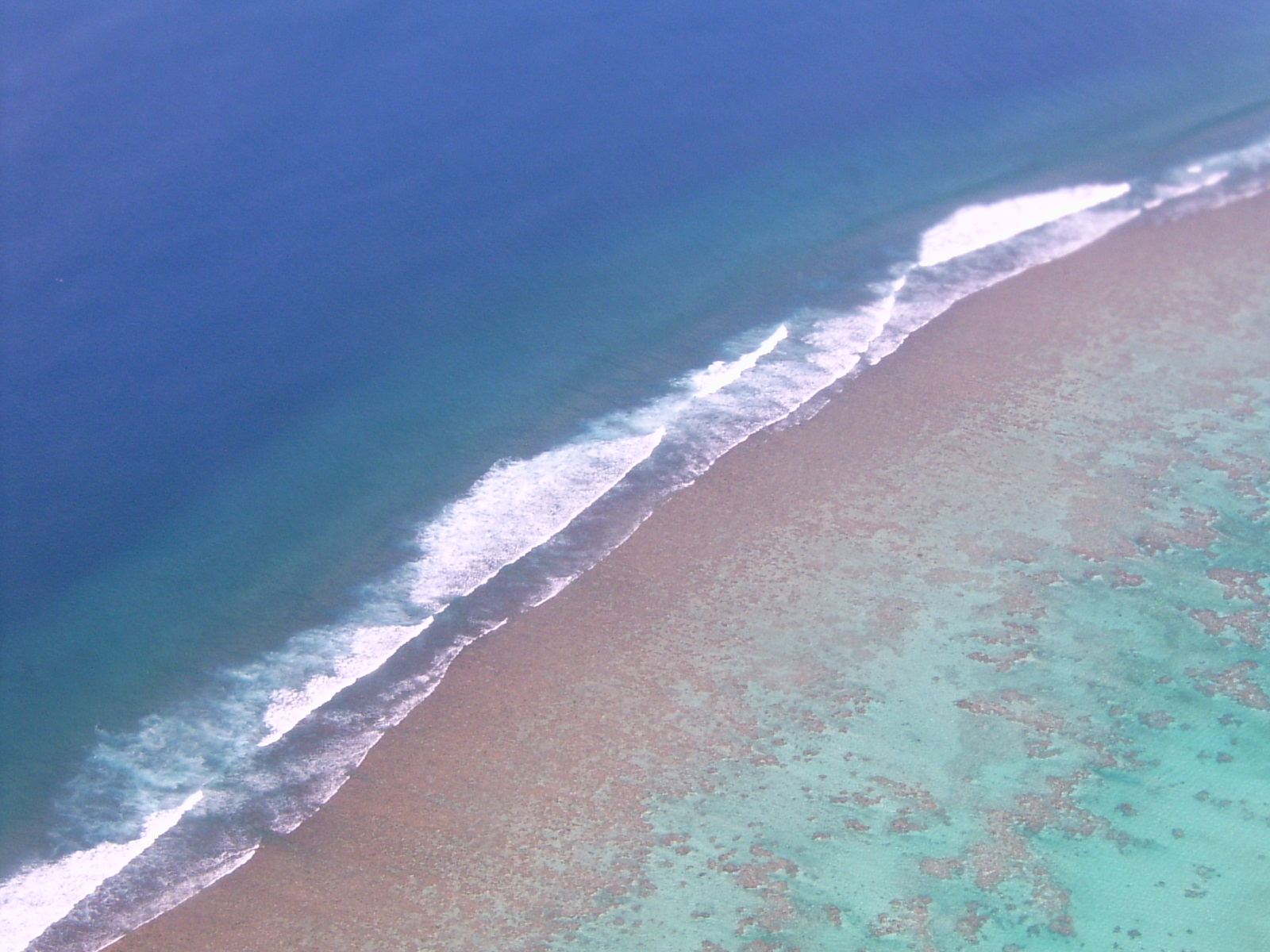
- A reef outside of Aitutaki, Cook Islands.
- Interactive map of Marae Moana
- Location: Cook Islands
- Coordinates: 21°14′S 159°46′W
- Area: 1,976,000 km^{2} (763,000 sq mi)
- Established: 2017

Marae Moana is a multiple-use marine protected area created on 13 July 2017, when the Parliament of the Cook Islands passed a bill creating the largest multiple-use marine protected area in the world at the time of its passage. Marae Moana covers the Cook Islands' entire exclusive economic zone of over 1.9 million square kilometers.

Kevin Iro, an environmentalist, first proposed the idea in 2010. Upon its passage, Iro said, "It's a historic time, particularly because everyone supported it, including our traditional leaders who spearheaded the whole thing." The bill had support from all parties in the legislature. The name of the marine park, loosely translating to "sacred ocean", was created in 2014 during a naming competition won by Bouchard Solomono, a student at Tereora College. Some media speculated that this legislation was the most significant since the independence of the Cook Islands.

Iro, who is a co-chair of the Cook Islands Marine Park Steering Committee, which was tasked with Marae Moana's legal designation, said this bill and marine park signifies “the sacredness of how Cook Islanders view our ocean space. It links us to our ancestors – it’s more than just the ocean.”

The legislation also creates fifteen marine protected areas extending to 50 nautical miles around each island where no large scale commercial fishing or seabed minerals activities are permitted. Fishing and mineral exploration will still exist in the exclusive economic zone, but is to be done sustainably.

The Prime Minister, Henry Puna, said, “Socially, economically and spiritually we must all take care of it – and it is imperative that all those that live and exist both within and beyond its boundaries do recognise and respect its sanctity,”.

“We do not only recognise that the ocean brings us revenue in terms of fishery and tourism and potentially sea bed minerals – it also provides us with clean air, clean water, and clean food to nourish and sustain us.”

“So this bill aims to sustain our livelihoods by protecting species and ecosystems as well as our cultural heritage that we inherit and pass on to future generations.”

Iro was inspired to create this legislation from his experience with the islands and ocean and seeing environmental decay such as pollution and overfishing. "When I moved back here (from New Zealand) about 16 years ago I saw what was happening to the lagoons and reefs and really wanted to protect them for my kids," he said. "I want them to have the same experience I did as a boy growing up."

== Biodiversity ==
The park includes atolls, a volcanic island, upraised limestone islands, and a sand cay. It is home to 136 species of coral, over 600 species of fish, and 21 species of cetacea (whales and dolphins). It is also home to three threatened species of turtles, as well as some tuna species. Marae Moana is also home to five species of reef sharks and eleven pelagic shark species. Marae Moana is also home to many birds and plants as well.

== Seabed mining controversy ==
In late 2018, the Cook Islands government began consultations to revise the seabed minerals act, which would facilitate exploration for deep sea mining. An estimated value of US$146 billion worth of manganese nodules are to be found six kilometres down on the ocean floor, particularly around the northern islands. The mining methods used to retrieve the minerals will likely be violently damaging to the local ecosystems.

In August 2019, a ten-year moratorium was proposed on seabed mining in the protected area at the Pacific Islands Forum creating both national and international debate. Due to significant support within the government for seabed mining the bill was not passed. Although any mining activity must be kept to certain areas of the park where impact on the marine ecosystems will be limited, the failure of the bill has drawn criticism due to the unclear determination of what areas of the park can be mined. Technical Director of the Te Ipukarea Society (TIS) Kelvin Passfield displayed concern about the lack of information available regarding potential mining sites, saying “we’re not saying no to seabed mining, [but] it depends on more information than we’ve got now".

The Cook Islands government has also faced a history of accusations of exploiting its national waters, including selling fishing licenses to foreign companies. Henry Puna, the Prime Minister of the Cook Islands, stated that a motivation to introduce deep-sea mining was a factor in the government's support of the Marae Moana: "We have minerals in our ocean, it’s just a matter of coming up with the technology to exploit it but not damage the environment. That’s why we’re keen to [set up] this marine park first so that it sets the standards for any exploitation: that’s why we’re doing it".

In September 2019, Jacqueline Evans, a prominent marine biologist and Goldman Environmental Prize Recipient who was openly critical of the government's plans for seabed mining was replaced as director of the park by instruction of the Office of the Prime Minister. Evans was responsible for developing the Marae Moana policy and the Marae Moana Act, and since the Act's passage in 2017 has, amongst other things, worked on raising funding for the park, expanding policy and regulations and developing a plan that designates permitted areas for industrial activities. Her removal as director has attracted local media criticism.

== See also ==
- Niue Nukutuluea
