= Table Mountain National Park Marine Protected Area =

Marine conservation area around the Cape Peninsula in South Africa

- IUCN category IV (habitat/species management area)
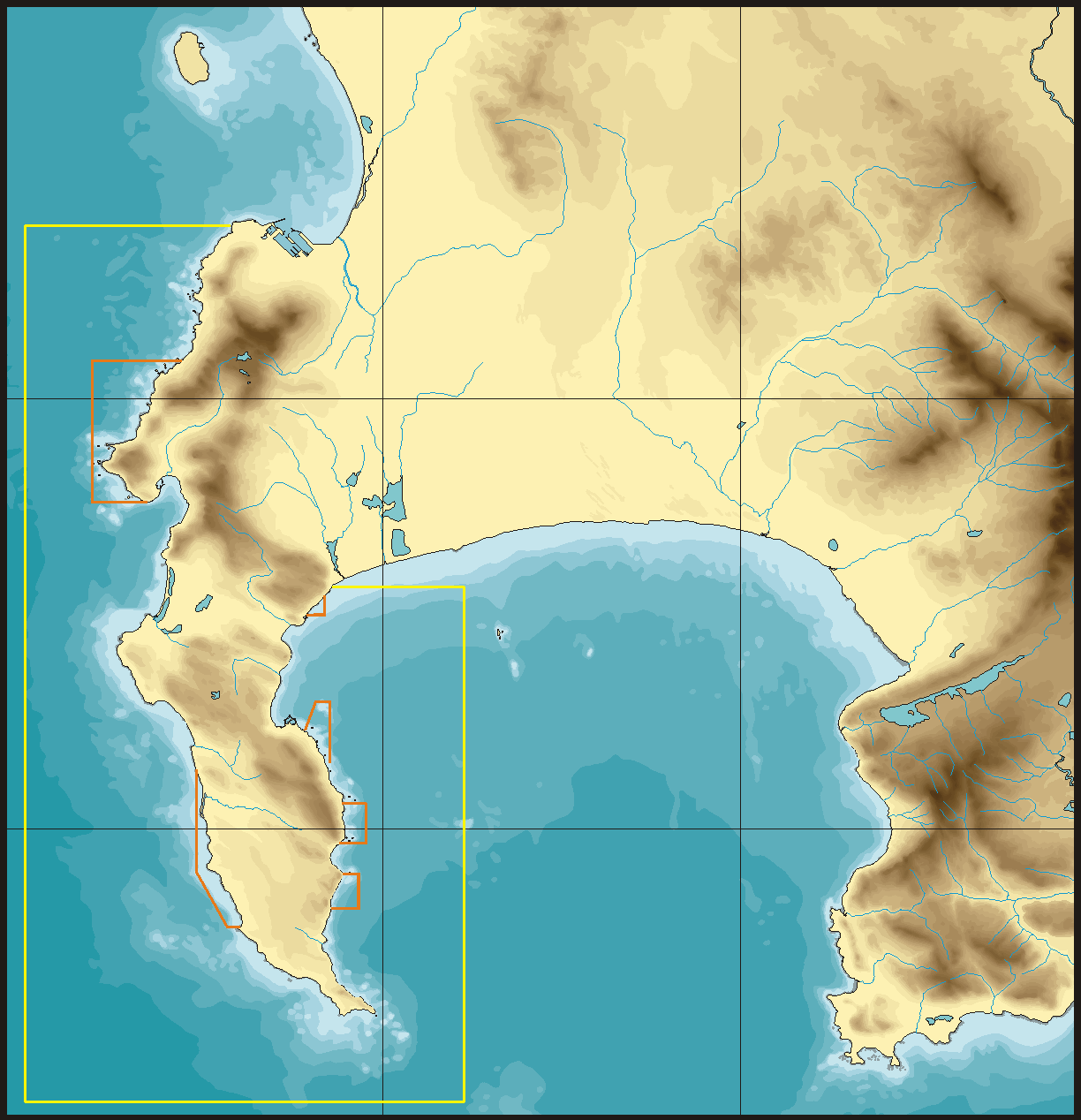
- Table Mountain National Park Marine Protected Area location
- Location: Coastal, Western Cape, South Africa
- Nearest city: Cape Town
- Coordinates: 34°00′S 18°20′E
- Area: 953.25 km^{2} (368.05 sq mi)
- Established: Proclaimed under the MLRA in 2004
- Governing body: SANParks
- World Heritage site: Cape Floral Region (terrestrial)
- Table Mountain National Park Marine Protected Area (South Africa)

The Table Mountain National Park Marine Protected Area is an inshore marine protected area around the Cape Peninsula, in the vicinity of Cape Town, South Africa. It was proclaimed in Government Gazette No. 26431 of 4 June 2004 in terms of the Marine Living Resources Act, 18 of 1998.

The MPA is of value for conservation of a wide range of endemic species, and has considerable economic value as a tourist destination. It encloses a large number of recreational dive sites visited by local residents and tourists from further afield. The shark and whale watching tourist industries are also represented, and there are several popular surf breaks. The MPA is mainly a controlled zone where extractive activities are allowed under permit, with six small no-take zones. The MPA is administrated by the Table Mountain National Park, a branch of SANParks.

The marine ecology is unusually varied for an area of this size, as a result of the meeting of two major oceanic water masses near Cape Point, and the park extends into two coastal marine bioregions. The ecology of the west or "Atlantic Seaboard" side of the park is noticeably different in character and biodiversity to that of the east, or "False Bay" side. Both sides are classified as temperate waters, but there is a significant difference in average temperature, with the Atlantic side being noticeably colder on average.

The MPA contains culturally significant fish traps, historical wrecks and traditional fishing communities, and is also important for commercial fisheries. Part of the West Coast rock lobster industry takes place within the MPA – as well as recreational and subsistence fishers, and an illegal poaching industry mostly targeting abalone, rock lobster and territorial linefish from the no-take zones.

== History ==
The MPA was proclaimed by the Minister of Environmental Affairs and Tourism, Marthinus van Schalkwyk, in Government Gazette No. 26431 of 4 June 2004 in terms of the Marine Natural Resources Act, 18 of 1998.

The Table Mountain National Park was originally established as the Cape of Good Hope Nature Reserve in 1939. The mountain above the 152 metre contour was proclaimed a national monument in 1958. The reserve was later expanded and in 1998 the Cape Peninsula National Park was proclaimed. In 2004 it was renamed as the Table Mountain National Park, and the Marine protected area added.

The Castle Rock Marine Protected Area, previously known as the Millers Point Marine Reserve, was proclaimed as a marine protected area in Government Notice R1429 in Government Gazette 21948 of 29 December 2000.

The original marine component of the park was made up of a group of smaller marine reserves, separated by unprotected areas. A variety of anthropogenic factors, including overexploitation of stocks, pollution, and poaching, combined with low compliance and poor enforcement of fisheries management strategies, like bag limits and minimum sizes, were not effective at preventing the decline of several economically important species.

The smaller reserves were combined with a larger surrounding region to form the TMNPMPA as a way to improve management of the resources. The MPA was consequently declared under section 43 of the marine living resources act(1988) in 2004, and moved to the National Environmental Management Protected Areas Act section 48A in 2014, which provides a stronger legal foundation for management of MPAs.

=== Legislative framework ===
Management of the MPA is legally obliged to comply with relevant national policies, legislation and international conventions.

Relevant national legislation includes:

- Animals Protection Act, 1962
- Conservation of Agricultural Resources Act, 1983
- Integrated Coastal Management Act, No 24 of 2008
- Marine Living Resources Act, 18 of 1998
- National Environmental Management Act, 1998 (No. 107 of 1998)
- National Environmental Management: Biodiversity Act, No. 10 of 2004
- National Environmental Management: Integrated Coastal Management Act 24 of 2008
- National Environmental Management: Protected Areas Act 57 of 2003
- National Heritage Resources Act 25 of 1999
- Sea Birds and Seals Protection Act, 1973 (Act No. 46 of 1973)
- Sea Shore Act 21 of 1935
- World Heritage Convention Act, No. 49 of 1999
- Wreck and Salvage Act 94 of 1996

Internarional conventions and treaties which apply include:

- Convention on Biological Diversity, 1992
- Convention on the Conservation of Migratory Species of Wild Animals, 1991
- Convention on International Trade in Endangered Species of Wild Fauna and Flora, 1973
- Ramsar Convention on Wetlands of International Importance Especially as Waterfowl Habitat, 1971

== Purpose ==
A marine protected area is defined by the IUCN as "A clearly defined geographical space, recognised, dedicated and managed, through legal or other effective means, to achieve the long-term conservation of nature with associated ecosystem services and cultural values".

This MPA is specifically intended to protect the marine environment and biodiversity of the region, to promote sustainable use of marine resources in the MPA, to allow over-exploited species of fish, abalone and rock lobster a sanctuary in which to breed and recover, to develop awareness of the MPA among recreational users, and to promote and regulate eco-tourism and scientific research.

Waters from the cold Benguela current and warm Agulhas currents meet and mix in the vicinity of the Cape Peninsula, resulting in a region of high marine biodiversity. The TMNPMPA is intended to protect this region to help sustainable commercial and recreational use of the coastal waters.

The six smaller restricted or "no-take" zones are thought to be breeding and nursery areas for marine life and the hope is that by leaving these relatively undisturbed, threatened species will have a chance to regenerate and increase the stock in adjacent areas.

As gazetted, the primary objectives of this MPA are to protect the marine environment and marine biodiversity, to provide a sanctuary for over-exploited and commercially collapsed species of fish in which they can recover and breed, and to promote and regulate ecotourism activities and scientific research in the MPA in a way that does not harm the environment.

== Extent ==
The MPA extends from Mouille Point in the north west, south along the west coast of the peninsula, around Cape Point, and north along the east coast of the peninsula to Muizenberg in the north east, with a total length of 127 km (79 mi) of coastline and area of 953.25 km^{2} (368.05 sq mi).

There are three 3 harbours within the MPA, the naval base and yacht club marina at Simon's Town, Kalk Bay fishing harbour, and Hout Bay fishing harbour and marina. There are also small craft launching sites at Witsands, Kommetjie (no slipway), Millers Point, Simon's Town, Buffels Bay and just outside the MPA at Granger Bay. The major international port at Cape Town is also just outside the MPA.

There are six restricted zones, in which no fishing or extractive activities are allowed, excepting that in the Karbonkelberg restricted area, fishing for snoek (Thyrsites atun) is allowed beyond the 35 m isobath. The combined area of the no-take zones is 56.4 km^{2} (21.8 sq mi).

=== Zonation ===
Zoning is a basic tool to accommodate functions beyond biodiversity conservation. Appropriate zoning can reduce conflict between users with differing interests, and can reduce adverse effects on the park's primary objectives by the varied uses. It can facilitate visitor access and allow traditional local community benefit to continue without excessive ecological damage by over-utilisation of sensitive areas.

A Restricted Area is a part of a marine protected area also known as a "No-Take" area, in which all extraction and harvesting of marine plant and animal life is prohibited. There are six of these within the TMNPMPA.

The remainder of the MPA is designated as a Controlled Area, where extraction and harvesting of marine life and other activities, are allowed on condition that one has a valid permit allowing one or more of the following specific activities: spear fishing, angling, scuba diving, snorkelling for mollusc extraction, boating, commercial diving, salvage operations, scientific research, commercial fishing, whale watching, shark cage diving or filming.

=== Boundaries ===
The Table Mountain National Park Marine Protected Area includes the seabed, the water, and the airspace above it to an altitude of 1000 metres above sea level. The lateral boundaries of the controlled area on WGS84 are offshore of the high-water mark between Green Point at S33°54.075'; E018°24.037' and Bailey's Cottage, Muizenberg at S34°06.590'; E018°28.250', to a line drawn east (090°T) from the beacon at Bailey's Cottage to S34°06.590'; E018°33.413, south (180°T) to S34°24.444; E018°33.413, west (270°T) to S34°24.444; E018°15.000', north (000°T) to S33°54.075; E018°15.000, and east (090°T) to Green Point at S33°54.075'; E018°24.037'.

==== Restricted areas ====
- Karbonkelberg Restricted zone
  Offshore from the high-water mark between Oudekraal at S33°58.757'; E018°21.847' and Hout Bay at S34°03.660'; E018°20.252', west (270°T) from Hout Bay to S34°03.660'; E018°17.797', north (000°T) to S33°58.757'; E018°17.797'; and east (090°T) to Oudekraal at S33°58.757'; E018°21.847'.
- Cape of Good Hope Restricted zone
  Offshore from the high-water mark between Hoek van die Bobbejaan at S34°18.393'; E018°24.258' and Schusters Bay Point, Scarborough, at position S34°12.271'; E018°22.194', south (180°T) from Schuster's Bay point to S34°16.490'; E018°22.194, to S34°18.393'; E018°23.500' and east (090°T) from position S34°18'.393S; E018°23'.500E to Hoek van die Bobbejaan at S34°18.393'; E018°24.258'.
- Paulsberg Restricted zone
  Offshore from the high-water mark between Venus Pool at S34°17.744'; E018°28.020', and Smitswinkel Point at S34°16.549'; E018°28.464', east (090°T) from Smitswinkel Point to S34°16.549'; E018°29.000', south (180°T) to S34°17.744'; E018°29.000', and west (270°T) to Venus Pool at S34°17.744'; E018°28.020'.
- Castle Rock Restricted zone
  Offshore from the high-water mark between Partridge Point at S34°15.480'; E018°28.344', and Millers Point at S34°14.100'; E018°28.508', east (090°T) from Millers Point to S34°14.100'; E018°29.300', south (180°T) to S34°15.480'; E018°29.300', and west (270°T) to Partridge Point at S34°15.480'; E018°28.344'.
- Boulders Restricted zone
  Offshore from the high-water mark between Rocklands, at S34°12.705'; E018°27.781', and Seaforth, Simonstown at S34°11.567'; E018°26.762', to S34°10.581'; E018°27.196'; east (090°T) to S34°10.581'; E018°27.781', and south (180°T) to Rocklands at S34°12.705'; E018°27.781'.
- St James Restricted zone
  Offshore from the high-water mark between the Kalk Bay Tidal Pool at S34°07.567'; E018°27.050' and the St James Tidal Pool at S34°07.123'; E018°27.568 south (180°T) from the St. James Tidal Pool to S34°07.567'; E018°27.568; and east (090°T) to the Kalk Bay Tidal Pool at S34°07.567; E018°27.050.

== Management ==
The marine protected areas of South Africa are the responsibility of the Department of Environment, Forestry and Fisheries of the national government, which has management contracts with a variety of MPA management authorities, in this case, South African National Parks (SANParks), which manages the MPA with funding from the SA Government through the Department of Environment, Forestry and Fisheries which is responsible for issuing permits, quotas and law enforcement.

The marine management objective of the TMNP is stated as "To safe-guard the sustainable use of marine resources within the Table Mountain Marine Protected Area (TMNP MPA)", and the Responsible tourism high level objective as "To develop, manage and enhance a range of responsible tourism attractions and products for visitors, recreational users and disadvantaged communities, to experience and appreciate the rich marine and terrestrial biodiversity and cultural history of the TMNP".

There is an approved TMNP management plan for 2015–2025 but no specific management plan for the MPA. MPA management is included in strategic park management plans for all aspects of the park including the marine component. The park officially has staff and resources dedicated to manage aspects of the MPA and cooperate with other marine law enforcement authorities, and recognises the importance of compliance monitoring in the management of abalone and West Coast Rock Lobster, which are found in the MPA. Although there are multiple management programs in place, they are understaffed and not always effective in terms of monitoring the MPA. Poaching is still a major issue within the MPA that adequate management has failed to effectively address. Other major risks to the MPA are assessed as over-utilisation of resources and pollution by city storm water outlets, sewage effluent dispersal systems and rivers,

There is a lack of integration of the physical, biological and social aspects into a coherent management plan, which has been attributed to a lack of capacity and infrastructure, and excessive bureaucratic process on the part of the government. The lack of input from resource users in planning and decision making has also been criticised.

- IUCN protected area category: IV (Habitat/Species Management Area)
- MPA id: 67704044

MPAs can be beneficial for biodiversity conservation and fisheries management. The primary function of MPAs is biodiversity and heritage conservation, but these objectives are not always incompatible with resource use activities, even fishing, if the extractive activities are sustainable and have a low ecological impact. This requires good planning, design and governance, which follow from effective management.

Periodical assessment of MPA management in South Africa has found that limited human resources in skilled staff, non-compliance and lack of monitoring and community education are unresolved problems.

Other items specifically identified in the TMNPMPA assessments include the need for budget reviews, development and implementation of a management and operational plan specific to the MPA, upgrades to infrastructure, development of research and monitoring programmes, and better stakeholder engagement.

The management has been criticised in an independent survey for failing to make necessary and useful information available to the users of the MPA.

=== Responsibility ===
Designated responsibility for some components of park management and enforcement is split between SANParks, DFFE, SAPS and City of Cape Town law enforcement.

SANParks is the designated management authority of the MPA, and is responsible for the administrative, monitoring and educational activities and coastal law enforcement. The Department of Forestry, Fisheries and the Environment Marine Resources Management is responsible for issuing fishing permits, allocating fishing quotas and law enforcement. Scientific services from SANParks and DFFE are responsible for conducting research and monitoring.

=== Law enforcement ===
In principle, the South African Police Service, City of Cape Town law enforcement, environmental officers, and fisheries authorities (DFFE) either collaborate with SANParks or independently operate along the coast to ensure law enforcement and compliance.

=== Budget ===
A total of 3.6% of the TMNP operational budget for annual recurring activity is allocated to marine management from 2015 to 2020, comprising R3,440,000 for 2015/6, R3,646,000 for 2016/7, R3,865,000 for 2017/8, R4,097,000 for 2018/9 and R4,343,000 for 2019/2020.

== Use ==
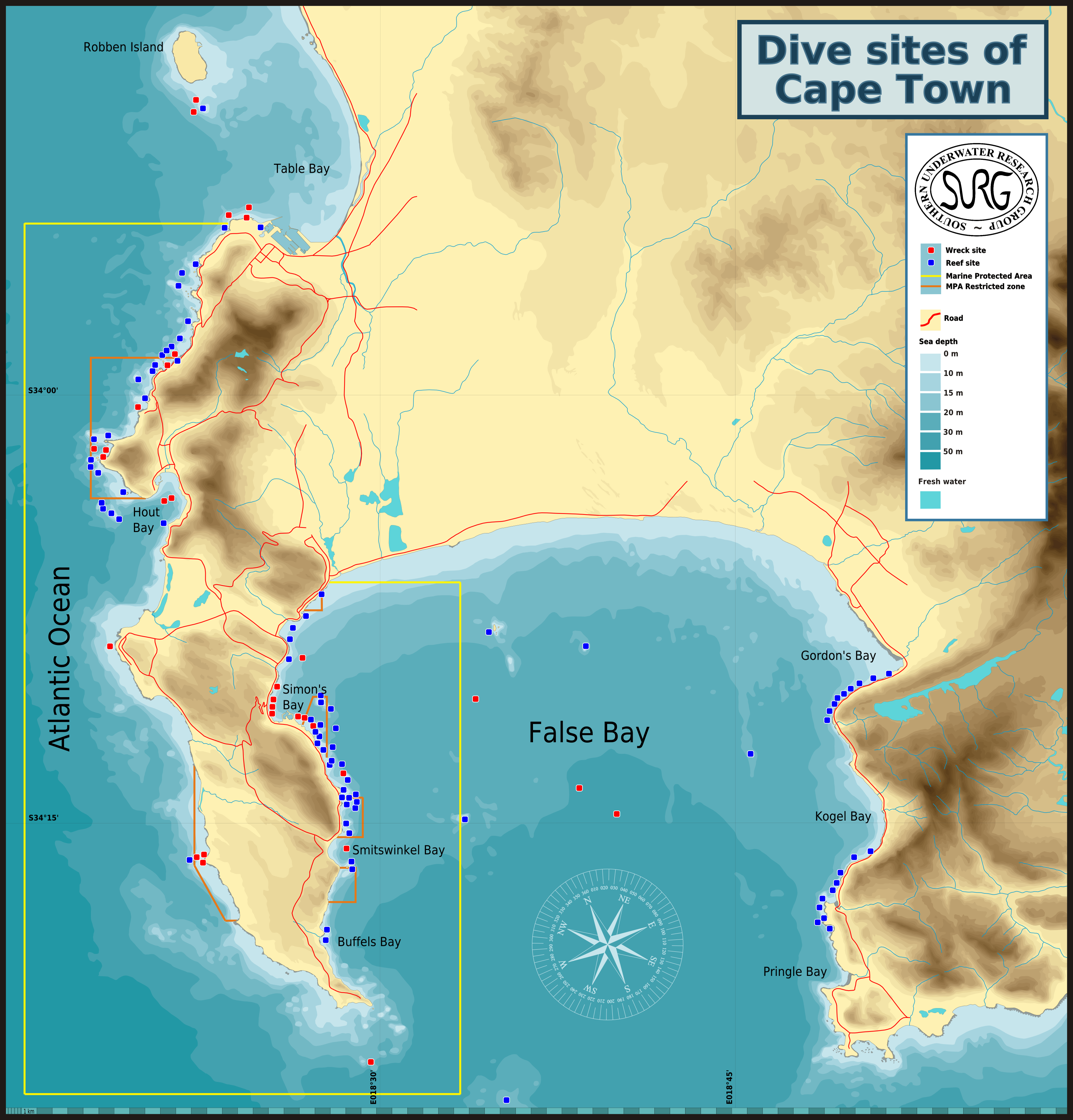
Map showing the distribution of most of the wreck and reef dive sites of the Cape Town local area

There is a high level of tourism and recreational activity in the MPA due to the large local population and Cape Town and the Table Mountain National Park being notable international tourism destinations. Tourist attractions inside the MPA include scuba diving, boat-based whale and shark-watching, snorkelling with seals and high-speed scenic boat rides. Threatened and protected species supported within the MPA include white sharks, abalone, African penguins and several over-exploited line fish species, such as red steenbras. This MPA has some of the most intensively studied waters on South Africa due to the presence of universities, the natural history museum and several marine research institutes in and near Cape Town, so more is known about the local biodiversity than most other MPAs in South African waters

Further use opportunities have been identified in education, monitoring and research, tourism and recreation development, and contributions to local economy through poverty alleviation and partnerships.

=== Slipways and harbours in the MPA ===
- Hout Bay Harbour and slipway: Commercial fishing harbour and yacht club marina with public access slipway, S34°03'01.76" E018°20'42.97"
- Soetwater slipway: Public access slipway, S34°10.692' E018°20.684'
- Kalk Bay harbour: Commercial fishing harbour.
- False Bay Yacht Club: Member access marina and slipway, S34°11'32.57" E018°26'0.31"
- Simon's Town naval base: Government access harbour and slipways.
- Miller's Point slipway: Public access slipway, S34°13'49.63" E018°28'25.12"
- Rumbly Bay slipway: Public access slipway on the south side of Millers Point.
- Buffels Bay slipway: Public access slipway controlled by TMNP.

These facilities support activities inside and outside the MPA, such as commercial and recreational fishing, recreational diving, boat based whale and shark watching, sea kayaking, sailing, and snorkelling with seals.

=== Activities requiring a permit ===
==== Fishing ====
Fishing is allowed in the controlled zone of the MPA subject to permits, regulations, catch limits and seasons set by the Department of Agriculture, Forestry and Fisheries. However, it remains a contentious issue in the area. Subsistence fishers are prohibited from fishing in no-take zones and do not have the boats or technology necessary to safely travel past the no-take zone. For places where they are allowed to fish, they often have to apply for expensive permits. In addition, for those subsistence fishers that are illiterate, they must hire a literate third-party to fill out the application for them. Finally, it is often difficult for these subsistence fishers to prove they have the start-up capital or private boat needed to obtain a permit.

Tension commonly exists between subsistence fishers and commercial fishers who are allowed to harvest rock lobster to measure the ecological growth rate of the species. This opportunity is not offered to subsistence fishers because they do not have the necessary gear.

Other activities requiring permits include recreational scuba diving.

==== Scuba diving ====
Most of the recreational dive sites of Cape Town are in the Table Mountain National Park Marine Protected Area. A permit is required to scuba dive in any MPA in South Africa. These permits are valid for a year and are available at some branches of the Post Office. Temporary permits, valid for a month, may be available at dive shops or from dive boat operators who operate in an MPA. A personal recreational scuba diving permit is valid in all South African MPAs where recreational diving is allowed. The business permit to operate recreational scuba business operations in an MPA is restricted to a specific MPA. Diving for commercial or scientific purposes is also subject to permit.

===== Named dive sites =====
The MPA has a large number of rocky reef and wreck recreational dive sites which have been identified by position and named. Some of them are listed here for the west coast of the peninsula from north to south, and for the east coast, also from north to south, roughly following the coastline:

Atlantic seaboard:

- Three Anchor Bay: 33°54.36′S 18°23.85′E
- Sea Point Ridge Pinnacles: 33°54.905′S 18°21.421′E
- Bantry Bay: 33°55.56′S 18°22.65′E
- North Paw Northern Pinnacles: 33°55.745′S 18°21.879′E
- Monty's Pinnacles: 33°55.797′S 18°21.808′E
- North Paw Eastern Pinnacle: 33°55.807′S 18°22.019′E
- Barry's Pinnacles: 33°55.841′S 18°21.647′E
- North Paw Cave Rock: 33°55.847′S 18°21.789′E
- North Lion's Paw main reef: 33°55.854′S 18°21.849′E
- South Lion's Paw: 33°56.308′S 18°21.890′E
- Clifton Rocks: 33°56.346′S 18°22.222′E
- Cleeve's Tunnel: 33°56.540′S 18°21.894′E
- Bakoven Rock: 33°57.555′S 18°22.204′E
- Dreadlocks Reef: 33°58′22.05″S 18°21′42.59″E
- Geldkis Blinder: 33°58.67′S 18°21.62′E
- Strawberry Rocks: 33°58.719′S 18°21.658′E
- Geldkis: 33°58.730′S 18°21.613′E
- Het Huis te Kraaiestein wreck: 33°58.850′S 18°21.650′E
- Mushroom Pinnacle: 33°58.781′S 18°21.521′E
- Justin's Caves: 33°58.85′S 18°21.50′E
- Sandy Cove: 33°58.90′S 18°21.65′E
- MV Antipolis wreck: 33°59.060′S 18°21.370′E
- Klein Pannekoek: 33°58.91′S 18°21.09′E
- Groot Pannekoek: 33°59.13′S 18°20.75′E
- Coral Gardens (Oudekraal): 33°59.270′S 18°20.782′E
- Coral Gardens offshore pinnacles: 33°59.270′S 18°20.515′E
- 13th Apostle: 33°59.486′S 18°19.922′E
- Llandudno Reef: 34°00.037′S 18°19.897′E
- Logies Bay: 34°00.25′S 18°20.53′E
- MV Romelia wreck: 34°00.700′S 18°19.86′E
- Steps: 34°01.330′S 18°18.600′E
- MFV Harvest Capella wreck: 34°01.600′S 18°18.750′E
- Rachel's Reef: 34°01.431′S 18°18.070′E
- Humpback Ridge: 34°01.548′S 18°18.142′E
- Wilhelm's Wall: 34°01.502′S 18°17.931′E
- Hakka Reef (Middelmas): 34°01.747′S 18°18.328′E
- Sven's Caves: 34°01.760′S 18°18.420′E
- Hakka Reef Southeast pinnacles: 34°01.780′S 18°18.380′E
- Twin Towers: 34°01.920′S 18°18.33′E
- MV Ker Yar Vor and the Jo May wrecks: 34°02.053′S 18°18.631′E
- SS Maori wreck: 34°02.062′S 18°18.793′E
- SAS Gelderland wreck: 34°02.070′S 18°18.180′E
- BOS 400 and SS Oakburn wrecks: 34°02.216′S 18°18.573′E
- Die Perd: 34°02.282′S 18°18.324′E
- Kanobi's Wall: 34°02.365′S 18°18.138′E
- SURG Pinnacles: 34°02.375′S 18°18.015′E
- Star Wall: 34°02.466′S 18°18.087′E
- M&M Cave: 34°02.426′S 18°18.191′E
- Lollipop pinnacle: 34°02.506′S 18°18.186′E
- Sunfish Pinnacle: 34°02.475′S 18°18.290′E
- Canyon: 34°02.595′S 18°18.116′E
- Dusky Pinnacles: 34°02.590′S 18°18.248′E
- Stonehenge North: 34°02.522′S 18°18.300′E
- A-340 Pinnacle: 34°02.740′S 18°18.200′E
- Stonehenge Central: 34°02.750′S 18°18.300′E
- Stonehenge South: 34°02.835′S 18°18.365′E
- Stonehenge Blinder: 34°02.885′S 18°18.316′E
- Stonehenge Wreck: 34°02.838′S 18°18.335′E
- Seal Island (Duiker island): 34°03.458′S 18°19.562′E
- Di's Cracks: 34°03.875′S 18°18.414′E
- Vulcan Rock: 34°03.967′S 18°18.582′E
- Tafelberg Reef: 34°04.22′S 18°18.93′E
- Klein Tafelberg Reef (Salad bowl, Yacht wreck): 34°04.442′S 18°19.191′E
- Tafelberg Deep: 34°04.736′S 18°19.032′E
- Sentinel: 34°03.54′S 18°20.82′E
- MFV Aster wreck: 34°03.891′S 18°20.955′E
- MFV Katsu Maru wreck: 34°03.903′S 18°20.942′E
- Die Josie: 34°04.497′S 18°21.256′E
- SS Clan Monroe wreck: 34°08.817′S 18°18.949′E
- SS Thomas T. Tucker wreck:
- Star of Africa wreck: 34°16.294′S 18°21.855′E
- SS Bia wreck: 34°16.212′S 18°22.638′E
- SS Umhlali wreck: 34°16.435′S 18°22.487′E
- Albatross Rock: 34°16.495′S 18°22.197′E
- South-west Reefs:

False Bay west:

- Muizenberg Trawler wrecks:
  - Western trawler wreck: 34°07.006′S 18°31.219′E
  - Eastern trawler wreck: 34°06.996′S 18°31.360′E
- Dale Brook: 34°07.436′S 18°27.154′E
- Kalk Bay Harbour Wall: 34°07.787′S 18°26.967′E
- Fish Hoek Reef: 34°03.54′S 18°20.82′E
- Sunny Cove: 34°08.68′S 18°26.30′E
- Quarry: 34°09.390′S 18°26.157′E
- Quarry Barge: 34°09.385′S 18°26.477′E
- Glencairn Fan Garden: 34°09.418′S 18°26.412′E
- P87 wreck: 34°09.570′S 18°26.420′E
- SS Clan Stuart wreck: 34°10.303′S 18°25.842′E
- East Indiaman Brunswick wreck: 34°10.880′S 18°25.607′E
- HMNS Bato wreck: 34°10.998′S 18°25.560′E
- Long Beach: 34°11.239′S 18°25.559′E
- Simon's Town Jetty: 34°11.525′S 18°26.597′E
- False Bay Yacht Club: 34°11.527′S 18°26.048′E
- Target Reef: 34°10.619′S 18°27.226′E
- Livingstone Reef: 34°10.605′S 18°27.571′E
- Castor Rock northern pinnacle: 34°10.687′S 18°27.590′E
- North Friskies: 34°10.720′S 18°27.830′E
- Castor Rock: 34°10.74′S 18°27.61′E
- Friskies Pinnacle: 34°10.778′S 18°27.822′E
- Wonders Pinnacle: 34°10.810′S 18°27.650′E
- Roman's Rest: 34°10.835′S 18°27.805′E
- Roman Rock: 34°10.87′S 18°27.60′E
- Spider crab Reef: 34°10.890′S 18°27.430′E
- Tivoli Pinnacles: 34°10.892′S 18°27.765′E
- Rambler Rock Northwest: 34°10.924′S 18°27.899′E
- Rambler Rock Northeast: 34°10.916′S 18°27.996′E
- Rambler Rock Southern Pinnacle: 34°11.011′S 18°27.918′E
- Hotlips Pinnacle: 34°11.146′S 18°28.091′E
- Dome Rock: 34°11.119′S 18°27.776′E
- Ammunition Barges wrecks: 34°11.408′S 18°26.985′E
- Phoenix shoal: 34°11.388′S 18°26.898′E
- Noah's Ark and the Ark Rock Wrecks: 34°11.533′S 18°27.232′E
- Penguin Point (Boulders): 34°11.889′S 18°27.254′E
- Maidstone Rock: 34°11.581′S 18°27.466′E
- Anchor Reef (Maidstone Reef): 34°11.575′S 18°27.600′E
- Ammo Reef: 34°11.564′S 18°27.754′E
- Photographer's Reef (JJM Reef): 34°11.839′S 18°27.434′E
- Torch Reef: 34°11.700′S 18°27.960′E
- Outer Photographer's Reef: 34°11.778′S 18°27.898′E
- Dangerous Doug reef: 34°11.950′S 18°27.650′E
- Lace Reef: 34°11.960′S 18°28.125′E
- Windmill offshore: 34°12.050′S 18°28.800′E
- Windmill Beach: 34°12.06′S 18°27.40′E
- Froggy pond: 34°12.22′S 18°27.40′E
- Fisherman's Beach: 34°12.357′S 18°27.497′E
- A-Frame (Oatlands Point): 34°12.484′S 18°27.662′E
- D-Frame (Oatlands Reef, Wave Rock): 34°12.378′S 18°27.996′E
- Insanity Reef: 34°12.817′S 18°28.044′E
- Rocklands Blinder (Seal Colony): 34°12.9′S 18°28.0′E
- Spaniard Rock: 34°13.03′S 18°28.03′E
- Alpha Reef (Outer Spaniard): 34°12.987′S 18°28.184′E
- Omega Reef: 34°12.855′S 18°28.435′E
- Stern Reef: 34°13.164′S 18°28.032′E
- SAS Pietermaritzburg wreck: 34°13.303′S 18°28.465′E
- PMB Pinnacles: 34°13.311′S 18°28.564′E
- North Caravan: 34°13.353′S 18°28.733′E
- Caravan Central: 34°13.435′S 18°28.547′E
- South Caravan: 34°13.513′S 18°28.721′E
- Inner Caravan: 34°13.500′S 18°28.450′E
- Miller's Point Slipway: 34°13.822′S 18°28.411′E
- Miller's Point tidal pool: 34°13.879′S 18°28.559′E
- Rumbly Bay: 34°14.059′S 18°28.494′E
- Murphy's: 34°13.956′S 18°28.986′E
- Boat Rock (Bakoven Rock): 34°14.05′S 18°29.05′E
- Festival Pinnacle: 34°14.140′S 18°29.015′E
- Fan Reef: 34°14.165′S 18°29.260′E
- Shark Alley: 34°14.21′S 18°28.60′E
- Pyramid Rock: 34°14.236′S 18°28.698′E
- Castle Pinnacles: 34°14.356′S 18°28.826′E
- Sansui Reef (Japanese Gardens):
- Castle Rocks Point Reefs (Outside Castle): 34°14.4′S 18°28.8′E
- Castle Rocks North Side: 34°14.322′S 18°28.65′E
- Inner Castle (South Castle): 34°14.46′S 18°28.674′E
- Outer Castle (Blindevals): 34°14.320′S 18°29.002′E
- Phone Reef: 34°14.226′S 18°29.202′E
- Giant's Castle: 34°14.358′S 18°29.226′E
- North Pie Rock Reef: 34°14.375′S 18°29.075′E
- East Pie Rock Pinnacles: 34°14.432′S 18°29.153′E
- West Pie Rock Reef: 34°14.396′S 18°28.943′E
- South Pie Rock Pinnacles: 34°14.445′S 18°29.985′E
- Whittle Rock Peter's Ridge: 34°14.800′S 18°33.160′E
- Whittle Rock Stingray Central (Bruce's Reef): 34°14.832′S 18°33.324′E
- Whittle Rock Western Reef Pinnacle: 34°14.856′S 18°33.269′E
- Whittle Rock Far Southwest Pinnacle: 34°14.881′S 18°33.241′E
- The Jambles: 34°14.885′S 18°28.890′E
- Graeme's Spot: 34°14.903′S 18°28.917′E
- Finlay's Point (Jenga Reef): 34°14.959′S 18°28.611′E
- Finlay's Pinnacle: 34°14.97′S 18°28.78′E
- Carnaby Street Pinnacle: 34°14.985′S 18°28.92′E
- Finlay's Deep: 34°15.005′S 18°29.194′E
- Atlantis Reef: 34°15.075′S 18°29.027′E
- Sherwood Forest: 34°15.190′S 18°29.01′E
- Fish Tank: 34°15.230′S 18°28.930′E
- Partridge Point Seal Rock: 34°15.337′S 18°28.892′E
- Deep Partridge: 34°15.337′S 18°28.930′E
- Dave's Caves: 34°15.378′S 18°28.704′E
- Partridge Point Big Rock: 34°15.465′S 18°28.788′E
- Peter's Pinnacles: 34°15.515′S 18°28.687′E
- SAS Transvaal wreck: 34°16.005′S 18°28.761′E
- MFV Oratava wreck: 34°15.998′S 18°28.774′E
- MFV Princess Elizabeth wreck: 34°16.068′S 18°28.839′E
- SAS Good Hope wreck: 34°16.054′S 18°28.850′E
- Good Hope Reef: 34°16.049′S 18°28.893′E
- MV Rockeater wreck: 34°16.127′S 18°28.890′E
- Kreef Reef: 34°16.360′S 18°28.780′E
- Horseshoe Reef: 34°16.410′S 18°28.940′E
- Smits Reef: 34°16.486′S 18°28.929′E
- Batsata Maze: 34°16.517′S 18°29.017′E
- Smits Reef West Pinnacle: 34°16.495′S 18°28.863′E
- Smits Cliff (Hell's Gate): 34°16.48′S 18°28.41′E
- Batsata Rock: 34°16.602′S 18°28.830′E
- Bordjiesrif: 34°18.99′S 18°27.83′E
- Buffels Bay: 34°19.217′S 18°27.73′E
- Anvil Rock pinnacle: 34°22.218′S 18°30.910′E
- Anvil Rock caves: 34°22.224′S 18°31.068′E

==== Other events ====
Events and functions, including races, professional film and stills shoots require a permit for the specific occasion and must be booked ahead of time through SANParks.

=== Experimental fisheries ===
An experimental octopus fishery was started in 2014 to gather data on octopus harvesting potential with a view to establishing a sustainable fishery and enhancing job creation and economic development in coastal areas. The deaths of whales trapped in octopus trap ropes led to protests and temporary suspension of the fishery pending scientific investigation of the experimental octopus fishery in False Bay in June 2019. Some of the fishing grounds involved are reefs in the controlled area of the MPA.

New rules for the octopus fishery intended to reduce the risk of whale entrapment were published and the fishery reopened in November 2019.

=== Education and public awareness ===
The Table Mountain National Park has established an Environmental Experience Programme, focusing on Cape Town's disadvantaged youth, which provides an opportunity to visit Cape Point, Boulders, Silvermine, and Oudekraal. The programme also arranges beach clean-ups and does some marine environmental education.

== Prohibited activities ==
- Fishing and spearfishing is prohibited in the restricted zones, except for fishing for snoek (Thyrsites atun) in the Karbonkelberg restricted zone in water more than 35 m deep.
- Personal watercraft (jet skis) may not be operated in the TMNPA excepting under an exemption allowing the use of PWCs for tow-in surfing at the big-wave breaks in the MPA by members of Tow Surf South Africa.

== Geography ==
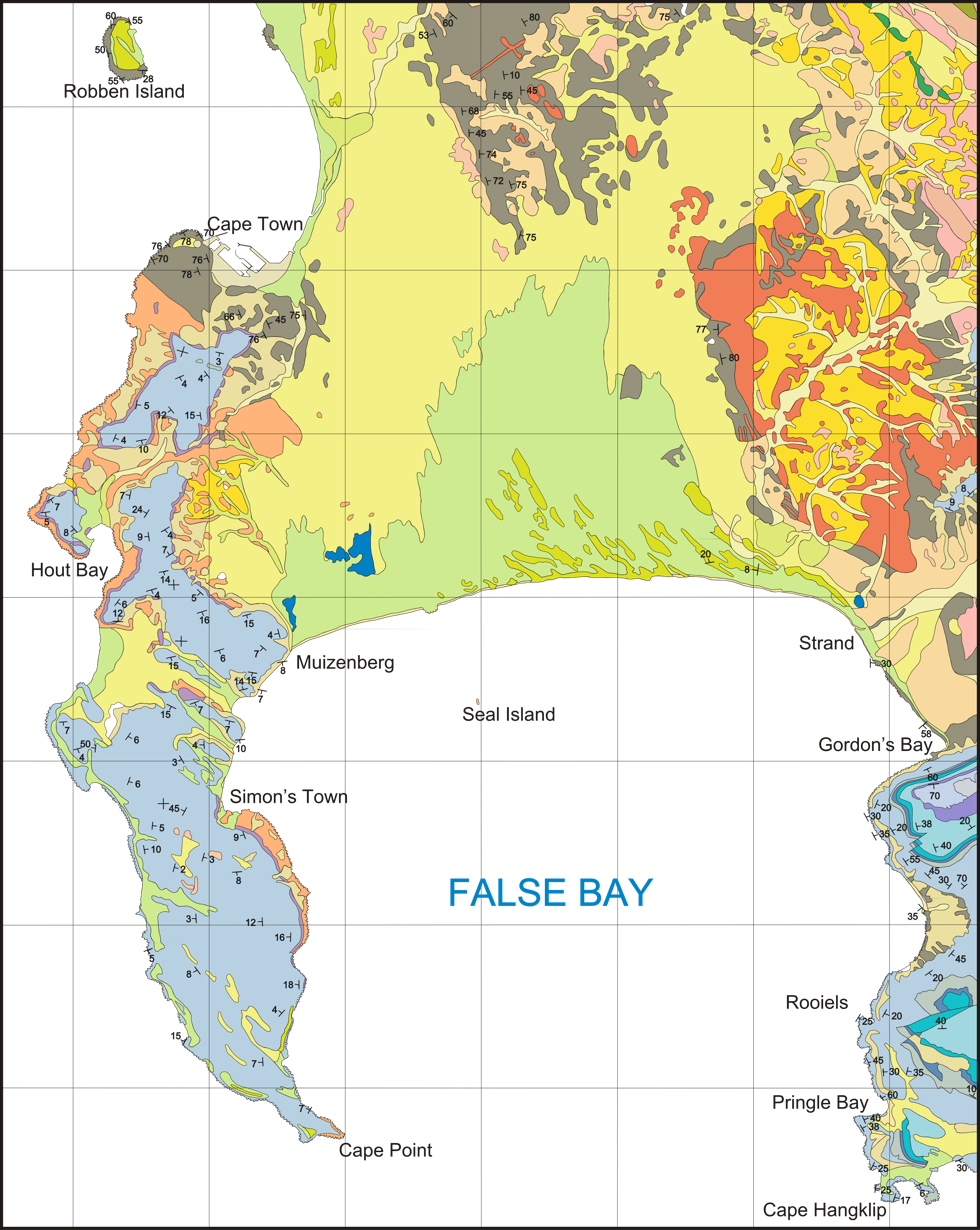
Geological map of the Cape Peninsula and False Bay

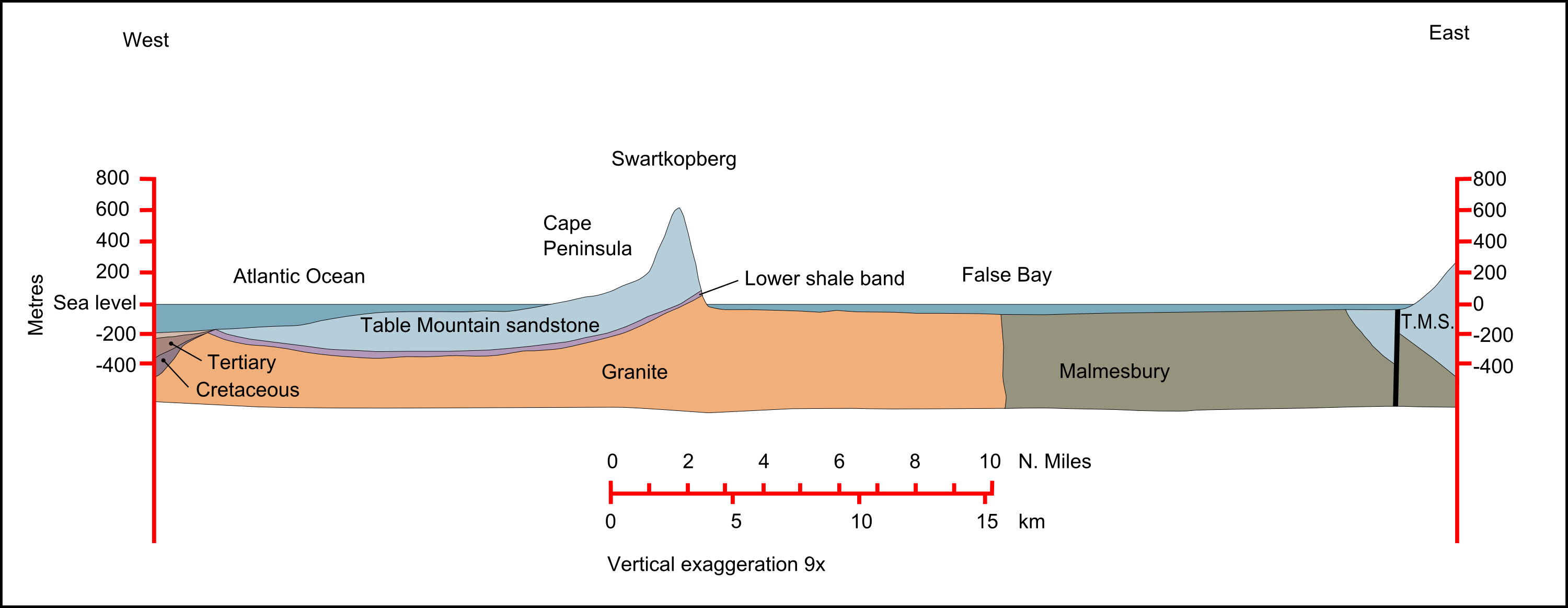
Geological section of the Cape Peninsula and False Bay

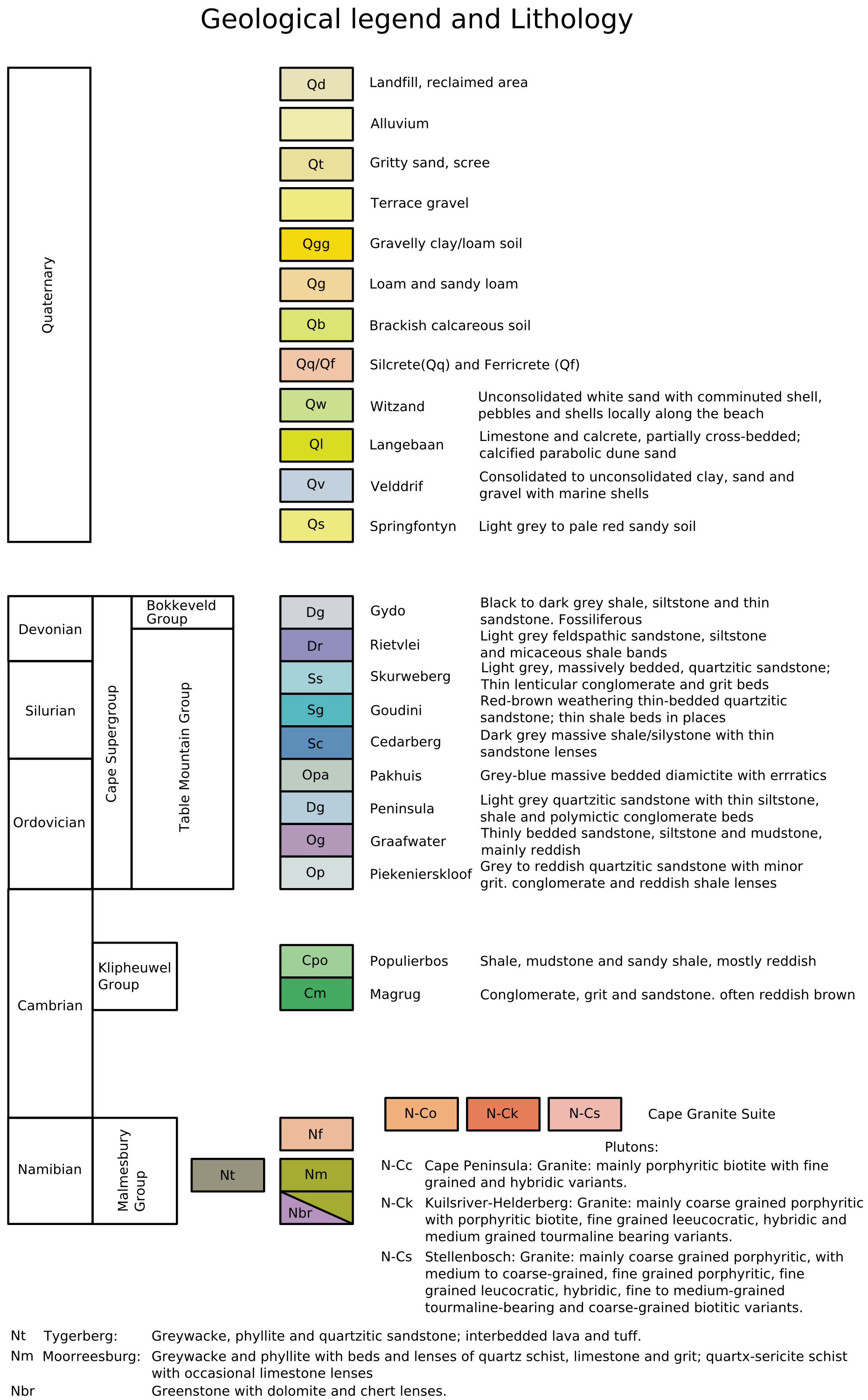

=== General topography ===
The City of Cape Town was founded at the northern end of the Cape Peninsula, a narrow mountainous strip of land at the most 11 km wide and just over 50 km long. The northern border is the coast of Table Bay, a large open bay with a single island, Robben Island, in its mouth.

A ragged coastline marks the western border along the Atlantic Ocean. A number of small bays are found along the coast with a single large one, Hout Bay, about halfway along. Further south the peninsula narrows until it comes to an end at Cape Point. A range of mountains with Table Mountain at 1,085m at the northern end forms the backbone of the peninsula. The highest point of the southern peninsula is Swartkop, at 678 m, near Simon's Town.

The eastern side is bordered by False Bay, and this stretch of coastline includes the smaller Smitswinkel Bay, Simon's Bay and Fish Hoek Bay. At Muizenberg the coastline becomes relatively low and sandy and curves east to Gordon's Bay to form the northern boundary of False Bay. From Gordon's Bay the coastline swings roughly south, and zig-zags its way along the foot of the Hottentot's Holland mountain range to Cape Hangklip which is at nearly the same latitude as Cape Point. The highest peak on this side is Kogelberg at 1,269 m.

In plan the bay is approximately square with rather wobbly edges, being roughly the same extent from north to south as east to west (30 km), with the entire southern side open to the ocean. The area of False Bay has been measured at about 1,090 km^{2}, and the volume is approximately 45 km^{3} (average depth about 40 m). The land perimeter has been measured at 116 km, from a 1:50,000 scale map.

==== Bottom morphology ====
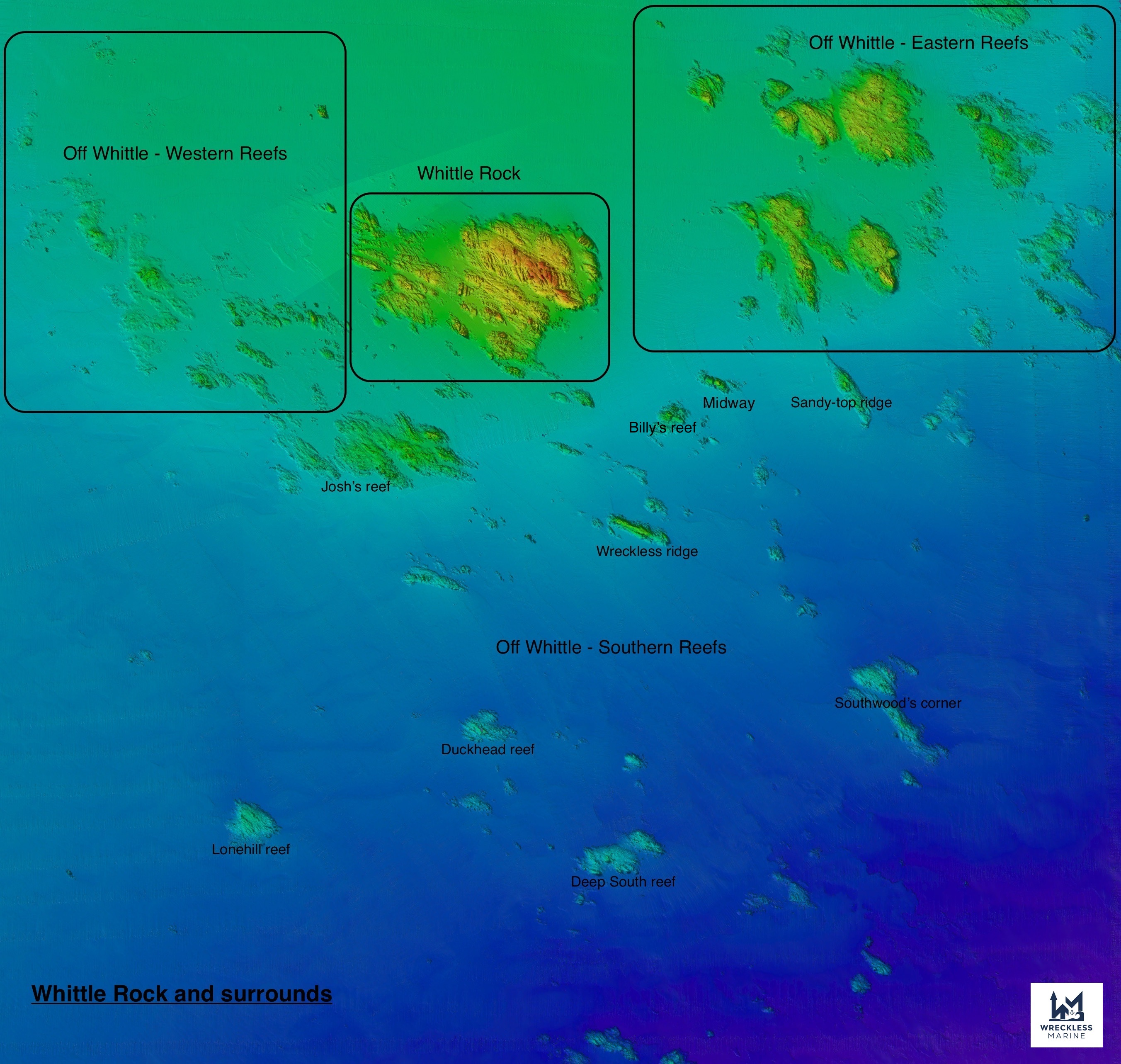
Multibeam sonar map of Whittle rock and surrounds

The bottom morphology of False Bay is generally smooth and fairly shallow, sloping gently downwards from North to South, so that the depth at the centre of the mouth is about 80 m. The bottom is covered with sediment which ranges from very coarse to very fine, with most of the fine sediment and mud in the centre of the bay. The main exception is a long ridge of sedimentary rock that extends in a southward direction from off the Strand, to approximately level with the mouth of the Steenbras River. The southern tip of this ridge is known to recreational divers as Steenbras Deep.

There is one true island in the bay, Seal Island, a barren and stony outcrop of granite about 200 m long and with an area of about 2 hectare. It is about 6 km south of Strandfontein and is less than 10 m above sea level at its highest point. There are also a number of small rocky islets which extend above the high water mark, and other rocks and shoals which approach the surface. Most of these are granite of the Peninsula pluton, but east of Seal Island they are generally sandstone, either of the Table Mountain series, or the underlying Tygerberg formation. Outside the bay, but influencing the wave patterns in it, is Rocky Bank, an extensive area of sandstone reef between 20 and 30 m depth.

A large granite reef, Whittle Rock, lies on the eastern edge of the MPA about halfway between the north shore and the mouth of the bay. There are several smaller granite reefs around Whittle Rock, some of which are also in the MPA.

Strictly speaking, False Bay is part of the Atlantic Ocean which extends as far east as Cape Agulhas, but when in Cape Town, Atlantic generally refers to the western seaboard of the Cape Peninsula, and the east side is referred to as False Bay, or the Simon's Town side.

=== Geology ===
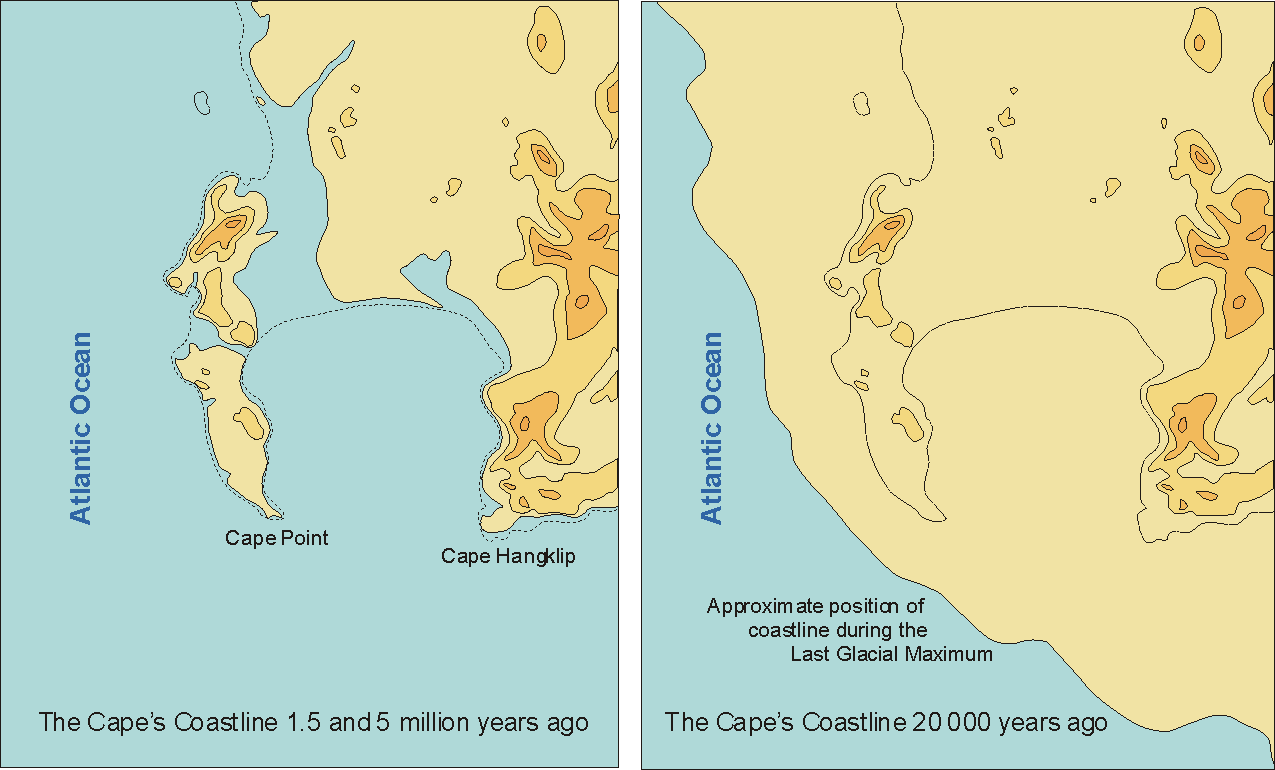
The Cape Peninsula shoreline in the case of (left) a 25m higher sea level that occurred around 5 and 1.5 million years ago, and (right) a 125m lower sea level at the time of maximum ice build-up during cold periods – the most recent being 20 000 years ago (after John S. Compton 2004)

The Cape Peninsula is a peninsula that juts out into the Atlantic Ocean at the south-western extremity of the African continent. At its tip is the Cape of Good Hope. The peninsula forms the west side of False Bay. The three main rock formations are the late-Precambrian Malmesbury group (metamorphic rock), the Peninsula granite, a huge batholith that was intruded into the Malmesbury Group about 630 million years ago, and the Table Mountain group sandstones that were deposited on the eroded surface of granite and Malmesbury series basement about 450 million years ago. The sand, silt and mud deposits were lithified by pressure and then folded during the Cape Orogeny to form the Cape Fold Belt, which extends along the western and southern coasts.

Almost 50% of the Cape Peninsula and Cape Flats area is covered by weakly cemented marine sands. Sea-levels fluctuated between −120 and +200 m from present mean sea level during the Pliocene and subsequent Pleistocene ice-age between 2 million and 15000 years ago as a result of fluctuating global temperature and variable amounts of water accumulated in polar ice caps. At times the sea covered the Cape Flats and Noordhoek valley and the Cape Peninsula was then a group of islands. Beach sands with shell fragments and estuarine muds were deposited and later overlain by calcrete-cemented dune sands as the sea retreated. "Dune rock" that was deposited during a Pleistocene interglacial period about 120,000 years ago is now being eroded in the sea-cliffs near Swartklip. During glacial periods the sea level dropped to expose the bottom of False Bay to weathering and erosion. The last major regression, about 20,000 years ago, lowered the sea level to the present 130m isobath, which is south of Cape Point and Cape Hangklip, leaving the entire bottom of False Bay and a large part of the continental shelf to the west of the peninsula exposed. During this period an extensive system of dunes was formed on the sandy floor of False Bay.

Over the last 2 million years of the Quaternary geological period, cool glacial periods (hypothermals) about 100,000 years long, have been the norm. Canada and northern Eurasia were covered by continental ice sheets kilometres thick, and the global effect was a lowering of sea level by some 130 m because the sea was the source of the frozen water of these huge ice sheets. This means that False Bay and Table Bay were dry and covered by dunes for 90% of the last 2 million years. Warm interglacial periods (hyperthermals), have lasted only about 10 000 years and we are part way through the latest one which started about 6000 years ago. The coastline of False Bay, therefore, was usually across the mouth of the present False Bay. Robben Island was a hill on a coastal plain with the coast west of the island for most of the past 2 million years. Sea level rises due to global warming may eventually increase this trend.

The large and small-scale relief of the coastal seabed is largely dependent on the local surface formation, where this is exposed above the generally sandy bottom. The granite areas are usually rounded corestone outcrops, influenced by the local jointing patterns, and can range between tall pinnacles, large low slab-like outcrops, and aggregations of boulders of a wide range of sizes. Usually a combination of these is present, often with sandy patches in local depressions, while the sedimentary facies present a more variable aspect, depending on the rock type, dip, strike, and thickness of the layers present. A very good estimate of underwater relief character can be made by observing the local topography above the water. An interesting local phenomenon is the contact zone between the intrusive granite of the Peninsula pluton and the older Malmesbury strata visible at the Sea Point shoreline. The bottom off the west coast of the cape Peninsula between and beyond the rocky reef areas is largely fairly fine white quartzitic sand with some areas of coarser shelly sand. The bottom sediments of False Bay are more varied. On the west side of the bay there is a general tendency towards fine to medium quartzitic sand and coarser calcareous material, mostly mollusc shell fragments, with patches of a maerl of branching coralline algae fragments. There are also areas of very fine sand, almost mud, in the more sheltered Simon's Bay. Most of the intertidal zone of the peninsula is rocky shoreline, but there are several sandy beaches of varying extent.

=== Hydrography ===
The Benguela current flows northward along the west coast, and Agulhas eddies move westwards along the south coast, bringing occasional warmer water into False Bay, along with drifting organisms from far upcurrent, which are often unsuited to the local conditions, and do not survive long. There are a few places in False Bay where they tend to end up. Currents in False Bay are generally weak, local, wind driven, shallow and not very predictable. Inshore currents in the MPA along the west coast also generally shallow and wind-driven.

Wind driven upwellings on the west coast are driven by strong south-easterly winds, which mostly blow in summer. Cold, clear, nutrient-rich water is drawn up from the deep to replace surface water driven offshore by Ekman transport, usually followed closely by algal blooms powered by the intense summer sunlight, which rapidly reduce water clarity and provide food for zooplankton. Lesser upwellings, also driven by south-easterly winds in summer, occur on the east side of False Bay near Cape Hangklip and Rooiels, where surface water temperatures can be 6 to 7 °C colder than the surrounding areas, and bottom temperatures below 12 °C.

Water temperature varies with the seasons. In summer False Bay is thermally stratified, with a vertical temperature variation of 5 to 9˚C between the warmer surface water and cooler depths below 50 m, while in winter the water column is at nearly constant temperature at all depths. The development of a thermocline is strongest around late December and peaks in late summer to early autumn.

The volume of fresh water runoff from rivers and stormwater drainage is low and mostly in late winter.

=== Bathymetry ===
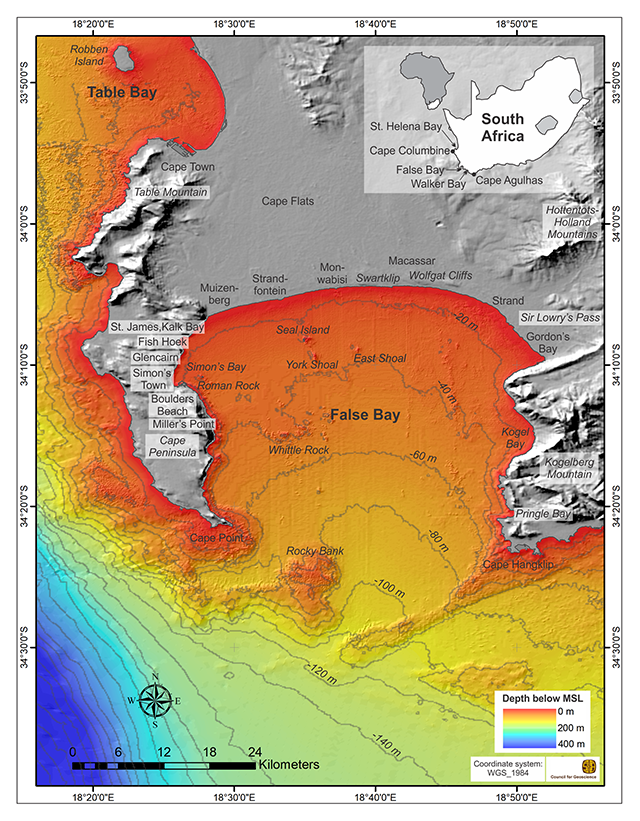
False Bay Bathymetry from SA Council for Geoscience

The Bathymetry of False Bay differs in character from the west side of the Cape Peninsula. The west coast seabed tends to slope down more steeply than in False Bay, and although the close inshore waters are also shallow, the 100 m contour is mostly within about 10 km of the west coast, while the entire False Bay is shallower than about 80 m. The bottom of the bay slopes down relatively gradually from the gently sloping beaches of the north shore to the mouth, and is fairly even in depth from east to west except close to the shorelines, with three major features disrupting this gentle slope. These are the granite outcrops of Seal island and Whittle Rock, and the hard sedimentary rock of the Steenbras ridge. Just outside the bay, there is a large shoal area at Rocky Bank, a relatively shallow area around Cape Pont, with two large pinnacles at Bellows Rock and Anvil Rock, and a long ridge extending south-west from Cape Hangklip, which channels cold, nutrient-rich water into the west side of the bay during upwelling events. Seal Island, Hangklip Ridge, Steenbras ridge and most of Whittle Rock are outside of the MPA.

Tidal range is moderate, with about 2 m range at spring tide on both sides of the peninsula, and tidal currents are negligible.

=== Climate of the Cape Peninsula ===
The climate of the South-western Cape is markedly different from the rest of South Africa, which is generally a summer rainfall region, receiving most of its rainfall during the summer months of December to February. The South-western Cape has a Mediterranean type climate, with most of its rainfall during the winter months from June to September.

The south westerly winds over the South Atlantic and Southern Ocean produce the prevailing south-westerly swell, which is strongest in the winter months, and which beats on the exposed Atlantic coastline and the east side of False Bay. The mountains of the Cape Peninsula provide protection on the east side of the peninsula from this wind and from the south westerly waves – a fact which influenced Governor Simon van der Stel in his choice of Simon's Bay as a winter anchorage for the Dutch East India Company’s ships for Cape Town.

Winter in the South-western Cape is strongly influenced by disturbances in the region between the circumpolar westerly winds and south-easterly trade winds, resulting in a series of eastward moving frontal depressions. These bring cool cloudy weather and rain on winds from the north west along the cold fronts which move in from the south west. The north westerly winter storms have wrecked many ships anchored in Table Bay over the centuries. Even today, in spite of technical advances and improved weather forecasting this still happens, though less frequently than in the past, and recently the salvage operations are more often successful. As the front passes, the wind shifts to south-westerly, and eventually south-easterly as the pressure rises, until the next front. The period between fronts tends to be in the order of a week, but can be highly variable.

During the summer the dominant factor determining the weather in the region is a high pressure zone, known as the South Atlantic High, located over the South Atlantic ocean to the west of the Cape coast. This high pressure zone moves seasonally, following the sun. The more southerly position of this high pressure zone in summer has the effect of blocking the cold fronts, and restricting them to pass mostly south of the continent. Winds circulating in an anticlockwise direction from such a system reach the Cape from the south-east, producing periods of up to several days of high winds and mostly clear skies. These south easterly winds are locally known as the Cape Doctor. They keep the region relatively cool and free of industrial pollutants. Because of the south facing aspect of False Bay, the west side of the bay is exposed to these winds, while Table Bay and the west coast of the peninsula experience an offshore wind. This wind pattern is locally influenced by the topography to the extent that gale-force winds may be blowing in one place, while a few kilometers away it may be almost calm.

=== Sea conditions ===
The waves reaching the shores of False Bay and the Cape Peninsula can be considered as a combination of local wind waves and swell from distant sources. The swell is produced by weather systems generally south of the continent, sometimes considerably distant, the most important of which are the frontal systems in the South Atlantic, which generate wind waves which then disperse away from their source and separate over time into zones of varying period. The long period waves are faster and have more energy, and move ahead of the shorter period components, so they tend to reach the coast first. This is known to surfers as a pulse, and is generally followed by gradually shortening period swell of less power.

Local winds will also produce waves which will combine their effects with the swell. Offshore winds as a general rule will flatten the sea as the fetch (distance that the wind has blown over the water) is too small to develop waves of great height or length. Onshore winds on the other hand, if strong enough will produce a short chop.

South-easterly winds which blow offshore and along the coast on the west side of the Cape Peninsula and the east side of False Bay cause a movement of surface water offshore to the west of the coast. This movement of water away from the coast is compensated by the upwelling of deeper water. The upwelled water is generally cold and relatively clear. However, as the upwelled water has a high nutrient content, the upwellings are often forerunners of a plankton bloom known as a "red tide", which will drastically reduce visibility.

The local tides are relatively weak, and there are no strong tidal currents on the Atlantic coast or in False Bay. Maximum tidal range at Cape Town is approximately 1.86 m (spring tides), and at Simon's Town 1.91 m, with minimum ranges at both places of about 0.26 m (neap tides).

Average summer surface temperature of the Atlantic off the Cape Peninsula is in the range 10° to 13 °C. The bottom temperature may be a few degrees colder. Minimum temperature is about 8 °C and maximum about 17 °C. Average winter surface temperature of the Atlantic off the Cape Peninsula is in the range 13° to 15 °C. The bottom temperature inshore is much the same. Average winter surface temperature of False Bay is approximately 15 °C, and the bottom temperature much the same. Average summer surface temperature of False Bay is approximately 19 °C. The bottom temperature is 1° to 3 °C lower than it is in winter, and a distinct thermocline will usually develop between December and about May.

A shallow surface current may be produced by strong winds. Tidal currents are negligible. Cape Point may have stronger currents, where eddies from the Agulhas current frequently produce a light- to medium-strength current.

Turbidity has a strong influence on the penetration of light to depth, including the wavelengths that penetrate, and long-term turbidity can affect the growth of seaweeds which depend on sufficient light for photosynthesis. The depth distribution of the various species found in the waters of the MPA vary depending on the general turbidity of the water of the specific area.

==== Seasonal variations in sea conditions ====
There is a significant seasonal variation in sea conditions in the MPA. In summer the South Atlantic High moves south over the ocean to the west of the Cape Peninsula and brings south-easterly winds to the Cape Peninsula. On the west side of the peninsula these winds blow along the coastline and offshore, causing an offshore movement of surface water by Ekman transport. The offshore flow is compensated by upwelling of bottom water, and as the continental shelf is narrow and relatively steeply sloped in this area, the upwelled water is generally cold, clear, and rich in nutrients. Surface temperatures can drop by a few degrees over a matter of hours. When this water is illuminated by summer sunshine, there is generally a phytoplanktonic algal bloom, which will produce a sudden increase in microscopic biomass in the surface layer, until the turbidity of the water restricts penetration of light to the deeper levels. Visibility in the surface water can drop almost as fast at it improved on a clear day, and can reduce from tens of metres to less than 5 m in a few hours. Deeper water may remain clear, but relatively dark. The south-east wind also causes upwellings on the east coast of False Bay near Hangklip, but the upwelled water is not usually as cold, has a lower nutrient load, and may be turbid, so the effect is generally less marked. Nevertheless, the effect can be impressive phytoplankton blooms, known as red tides. The water in False Bay is constrained from westward flow by the Cape Peninsula, so these red tides can be relatively persistent. The south easterly wind can push up a very rough wind wave, but the fetch is short and it usually dies down quite quickly, but while it lasts it can clear a large amount of benthic fauna off the shallower reefs, which may take weeks or months to find its way back.

In winter, the South Atlantic High moves north and the weather pattern is dominated by cold fronts formed over the Southern Ocean, The winds generally follow the pattern of light to strong north-westerly, swinging though south-westerly as the front passes overhead, and followed by relatively weak south-easterlies. North-westerly gales produce powerful wind waves which batter the west coast of the peninsula, but the east side waters may be calm, with a minor wind chop due to the short fetch. The westerly winds may also clean up the surface waters of the west side of False Bay, and as there is usually much lower insolation at this time of year, plankton does not usually bloom, and the water remains relatively clear.

The westerly storms of the Southern Ocean also produce very large waves with a large amount of their energy propagating towards the north-east, and as these move away from their source they separate by wave-length, as the wave velocity is a function of the wavelength, with the longer, more powerful waves travelling faster and losing less energy as they travel. These become swells, and by the time they reach the Cape Peninsula the leading pulse is usually in the 13 to 15 second period band, occasionally up to 18 seconds. Depending on deep-water amplitude, they can break over some of the reefs outside Hout Bay at heights of up to 70 feet (21 m), making this a world-class big wave break. Most of the energy of swells with a significant westerly component does not make it round the corner of Cape Point into the west side of False Bay. On the same day that big waves are breaking on the west coast, it may be calm enough for scuba diving from the shore in Simon's Town, on the False Bay coast on the other side of the peninsula.

Sea surface temperatures off the west and south coasts of South Africa are affected by El Niño–Southern Oscillation (ENSO) via changes in surface wind strength. During El Niño the south-easterly winds driving upwelling are weaker which results in warmer coastal waters than normal, while during La Niña the same winds are stronger and cause colder coastal waters. These effects on the winds are part of large scale influences on the tropical Atlantic and the South Atlantic High-pressure system, and changes to the pattern of westerly winds further south. There are other influences not known to be related to ENSO of similar importance. Some ENSO events do not lead to the expected changes.

== Ecology ==
Marine ecoregions of the South African Exclusive Economic Zone: Table Mountain National Park Marine Protected Area spans the boundary between the Benguela ecoregion and the Agulhas ecoregion.

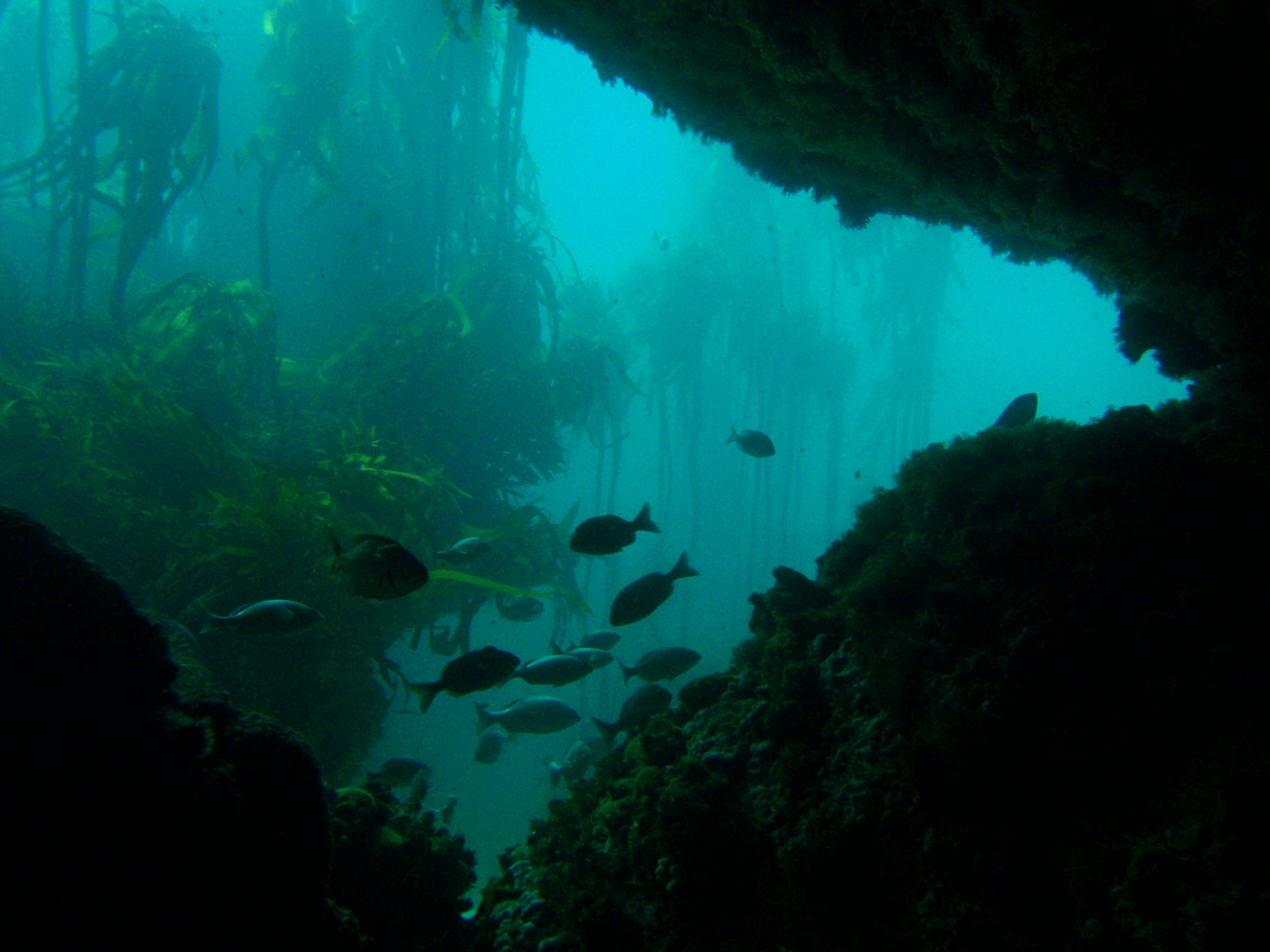
Kelp forest on a high-profile inshore reef

Cape Point at the tip of the Cape Peninsula is considered the boundary between two of the four inshore marine ecoregions of South Africa. To the west of Cape Point is the cool to cold temperate Benguela ecoregion which extends from Cape Columbine to Cape Point, and is dominated by the cold Benguela Current, and the warm temperate Agulhas ecoregion to the east of Cape Point which extends eastwards to the Mbashe River. The Cape Point break is considered to be a relatively distinct change in the bioregions and this can be clearly seen from the difference in the ecologies between the Atlantic seaboard of the peninsula and False Bay, though there is a significant overlap of resident organisms. There are a large proportion of species endemic to South Africa along this coastline.

=== Habitats ===
Four major habitats types exist in the sea in this region, distinguished by the nature of the substrate. The substrate, or base material, is important in that it provides a base to which an organism can anchor itself, which is vitally important for those organisms which need to stay in one particular kind of place. Rocky shores and reefs provide a firm fixed substrate for the attachment of plants and animals. Some of these may have kelp forests, which reduce the effect of waves and provide food and shelter for an extended range of organisms. Sandy beaches and bottoms are a relatively unstable substrate and cannot anchor kelp or many of the other benthic organisms. Finally there is open water, above the substrate and clear of the kelp forest, where the organisms must drift or swim. Mixed habitats are also frequently found, which are a combination of those mentioned above. There are no significant estuarine habitats in the MPA.

Rocky shores and reefs

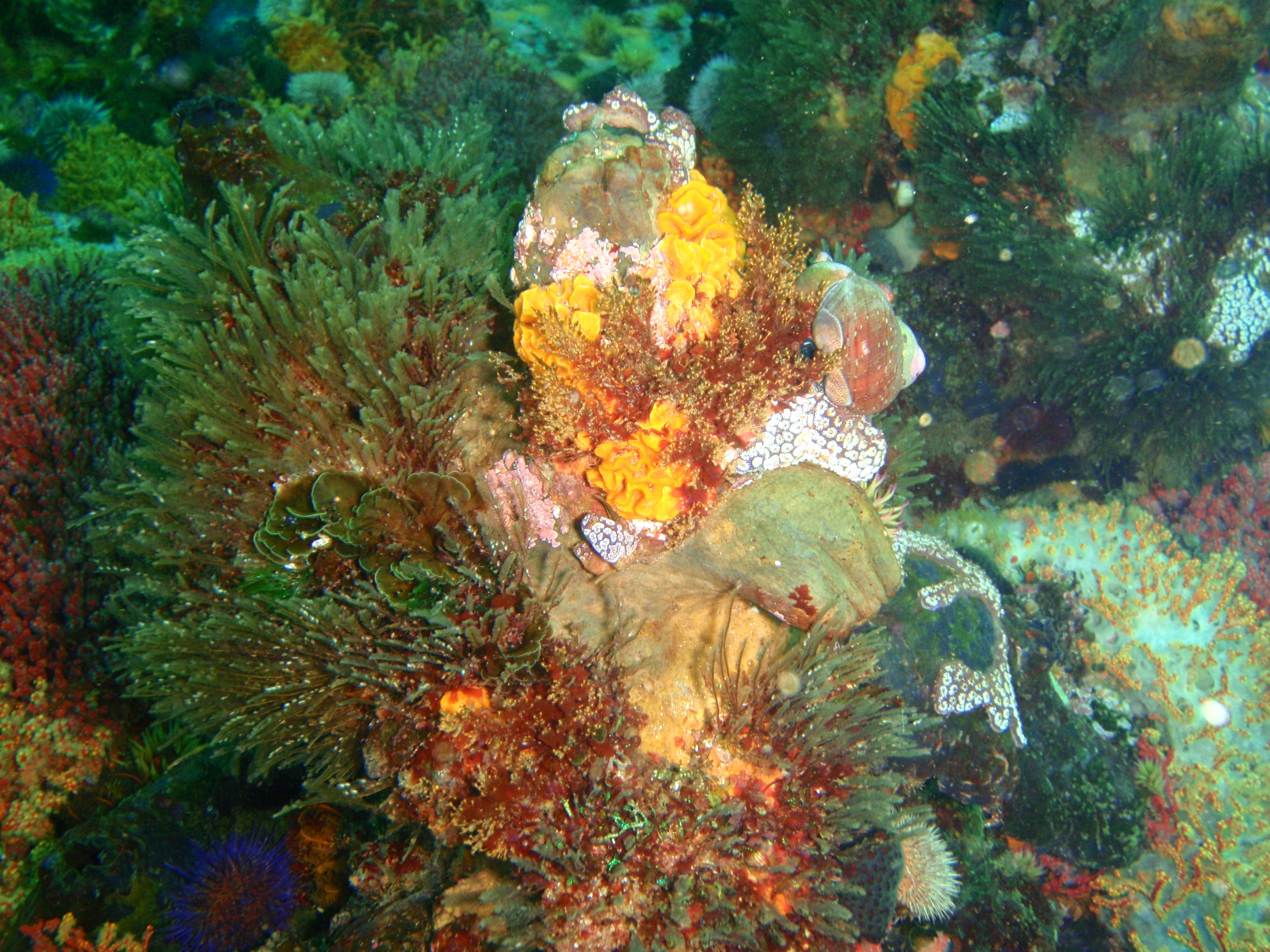
Several layers of marine life may co-exist in apparent harmony

There are extensive rocky reefs and mixed rocky and sandy bottoms, with a significant number of wrecks, which are equivalent to rocky reefs for classification of habitat, as in general, marine organisms are not particular about the material of the substrate if the texture and strength is suitable and it is not toxic. For many marine organisms the substrate is another type of marine organism, and it is common for several layers to co-exist. Examples of this are red bait pods, which are usually encrusted with sponges, ascidians, bryozoans, anemones, and gastropods, and abalone, which are usually covered by similar seaweeds to those found on the surrounding rocks, usually with a variety of other organisms living on the seaweeds.

The type of rock of the reef is of some importance, as it influences the range of possibilities for the local topography, which in turn influences the range of habitats provided, and therefore the diversity of inhabitants. Granite reefs generally have a relatively smooth surface in the centimetre to decimetre scale, but are often high profile in the metre scale, so they provide macro-variations in habitat from relatively horizontal upper surface, near vertical sides, to overhangs, holes and tunnels, on a similar scale to the boulders and outcrops themselves. There are relatively few small crevices compared to the overall surface area. Sandstone and other sedimentary rocks erode and weather very differently, and depending on the direction of dip and strike, and steepness of the dip, may produce reefs which are relatively flat to very high profile and full of small crevices. These features may be at varying angles to the shoreline and wave fronts. There are far fewer large holes, tunnels and crevices in sandstone reefs, but often many deep but low near-horizontal crevices. In some areas the reef is predominantly wave-rounded medium to small boulders. In this case the type of rock has little influence.

The coastline in this region was considerably lower during the most recent ice-ages, and the detail topography of the dive sites was largely formed during the period of exposure above sea level. As a result, the underwater relief is mostly very similar in character to the nearest landscape above sea level. There are notable exceptions where the rock above and below the water is of a different type. These are mostly in False Bay south of Smitswinkel Bay, where there is a sandstone shore with granite reefs.

Kelp forests

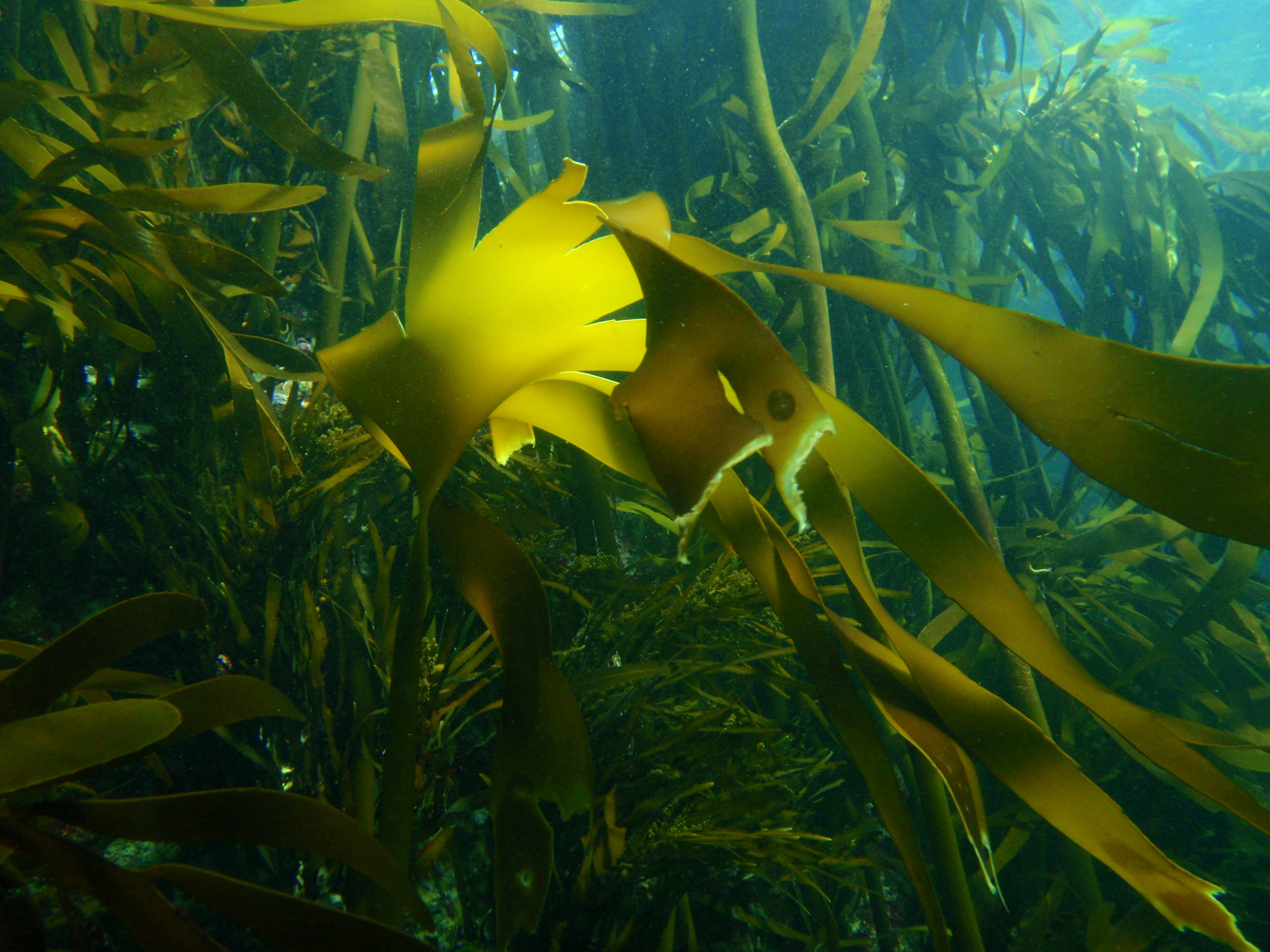
Dense kelp forest with algal understorey

Kelp forests are a variation of rocky reefs, as the kelp requires a fairly strong and stable substrate which can withstand the loads of repeated waves dragging on the kelp plants. The Sea bamboo Ecklonia maxima grows in water which is shallow enough to allow it to reach to the surface with its gas-filled stipes, so that the fronds form a dense layer at or just below the surface, depending on the tide. The shorter Split-fan kelp Laminaria pallida grows mostly on deeper reefs, where there is not so much competition from the sea bamboo. Both these kelp species provide food and shelter for a variety of other organisms, particularly the Sea bamboo, which is a base for a wide range of epiphytes, which in turn provide food and shelter for more organisms. There are also places where the spined kelp Ecklonia radiata can be found east of Cape Point, and bladder kelp, Macrocystis pyrifera in sheltered areas west of Cape Point, often inshore of the Ecklonia forests.

Sandy beaches and bottoms (including shelly, pebble and gravel bottoms)

Sandy bottoms at first glance appear to be fairly barren areas, as they lack the stability to support many of the spectacular reef based species, and the variety of large organisms is relatively low. The sand is continually being moved around by wave action, to a greater or lesser degree depending on weather conditions and exposure of the area. This means that sessile organisms must be specifically adapted to areas of relatively loose substrate to thrive in them, and the variety of species found on a sandy or gravel bottom will depend on all these factors. Sandy bottoms have one important compensation for their instability, animals can burrow into the sand and move up and down within its layers, which can provide feeding opportunities and protection from predation. Other species can dig themselves holes in which to shelter, or may feed by filtering water drawn through the tunnel, or by extending body parts adapted to this function into the water above the sand.

The open sea

The pelagic water column is the major part of the living space at sea. This is the water between the surface and the top of the benthic zone, where living organisms swim, float or drift, and the food chain starts with phytoplankton, the mostly microscopic photosynthetic organisms that convert the energy of sunlight into organic material which feeds everything else, directly or indirectly. In temperate seas there are distinct seasonal cycles of phytoplankton growth, based on the available nutrients and the available sunlight. Either can be a limiting factor. Phytoplankton tend to thrive where there is plenty of light, and they themselves are a major factor in restricting light penetration to greater depths, so the photosynthetic zone tends to be shallower in areas of high productivity. Zooplankton feed on the phytoplankton, and are in turn eaten by larger animals. The larger pelagic animals are generally faster moving and more mobile, giving them the option of changing depth to feed or to avoid predation, and to move to other places in search of a better food supply. Plankton blooms following upwelling events are a characteristic of the west side of the peninsula in particular

Red tides

On the west coast of the peninsula and to a lesser extent the east side of False Bay, the south easterly winds can cause upwelling of deep, cold, nutrient rich waters. This generally happens in summer when these winds are strongest, and this in combination with the intense summer sunlight provides conditions conducive to rapid growth of phytoplankton. If the upwelling is then followed by a period of light wind or onshore winds, some species of phytoplankton can bloom so densely that they colour the water, most noticeably a reddish or brownish colour, which is known as a red tide.

Depending on the species involved, these red tides may cause mass mortalities to marine animals for various reasons. In some cases the organisms may consume all the available nutrients and then die, leaving decaying remains which deplete the water of oxygen, asphyxiating the animal life, while others may simply become so dense that they clog the gills of marine animals, with similar effect. A third group are inherently toxic, and these may be particularly problematic as some filter feeding species are immune to the toxins but accumulate them in their tissues and will then be toxic to humans who may eat them.

Red tides also have the effect of reducing light penetration. The reduction in illumination can range from a mild effect in the surface layers, to seriously reduced illunmination to considerable depth. Red tides may be small and localised and usually last for a few days, but in extreme cases have been known to extend from Doringbaai to Cape Agulhas, several hundred kilometres to both sides of Cape Town, and take weeks to disperse (March 2005).

=== Marine species diversity ===
White sharks, abalone, African penguins, many over-exploited linefish species, West coast rock lobster. Besides the resident species and several known migrants, the waters of the MPA are occasionally visited by vagrants carried in by the eddies of the Agulhas Current, which can bring tropical and subtropical specimens normally resident thousands of kilometres away.

==== Animals ====
Number of marine animal species listed by phylum:

- Poriferans: 28
- Cnidarians: 68
- Ctenophores: 4
- Platyhelmimthes: 4
- Polychaetes: 15
- Arthropods: 89
- Bryozoans: 32
- Molluscs: 242
- Brachiopods: 3
- Echinoderms:28
- Tunicates: 27
- (Marine invertebrates total: 690)
- Vertebrates:
  - Fish: 472 (45 sharks and rays, 149 bony fish)
  - Reptiles: 3
  - Seabirds: 41
  - Marine mammals: 16

==== Seaweeds ====
More than 300 species of seaweed are recorded from the Cape Peninsula and False Bay. Most of these in the MPA. These include kelp from three genera, Ecklonia, Laminaria and Macrocystis, and a range of other brown, green and red algae. The kelp forests provide shelter for a wide range of organisms, including other seaweeds, which form algal turfs and understoreys and live as epiphytes on the kelp and other sessile organisms. In the inshore shallow water Ecklonia maxima is common, and they grow to relatively small stipe lengths to match the water depth. The waters are well illuminated and many other seaweeds live under the kelp canopy, to a large extent crowding out the sessile fauna. In slightly deeper water the Ecklonia reaches its maximum length at around 17 m, and maximum biomass per area. In this zone Laminaria pallida, the split-fan kelp, forms a secondary canopy, and under this an understorey of smaller seaweeds, including many species of encrusting and arborescent red seaweeds. In deeper water the Ecklonia do not thrive and are taken over by Laminaria. When there is insufficient light for Laminaria the algal turf is mostly red seaweeds, including many varieties of corallines. Kelp beds are important to the life cycle of several animals. The sea urchin Parechinus angulosus feeds on kelp detritus, and browses the sporelings, keeping the rock surfaces relatively free of young kelp plants. Where there are sparse urchins, the kelp can establish more easily, and adult Laminaria fronds tend to sweep the underlying surfaces clear of some of the invertebrates which browse on the kelp. On deeper reefs, and on more steeply sloped rock surfaces there is less seaweed biomass as the light is insufficient.

The TMNPMPA has records of 129 species of seaweed found within its boundaries.

The more prominent red seaweeds of the west coast of the Cape Peninsula include several species of foliose algae, including Botryocarpa prolifera, Botryoglossum platycarpum, Epymenia capensis, Epymenia obtusa, Gigartina bracteata, Neuroglossum binderianum, Pachymenia carnosa, Plocamium corallorhiza, Thamnophyllis discigera, and Thammnophyllis pocockiae. Also, filamentous red algae including Ceramium obsoletum, Polysiphonia virgata, and Polyopes constrictus.

==== Endemism ====
Endemism is the ecological state of a species being unique to a defined geographic location, such as an island, nation, country or other defined zone, or habitat type; organisms that are indigenous to a place are not endemic to it if they are also found elsewhere. The extreme opposite of endemism is cosmopolitan distribution. The MPA is small, and it is unlikely that there are any species endemic to only the MPA, but it may be the only or largest MPA within the known range of some endemic species. Some species are only recorded from the MPA, but this may be an artifact of the relatively high level of research and observation in this region.

==== Species protected by the MPA ====
Threatened species protected by the MPA include white sharks, abalone, African penguins, Hottentot seabream, galjoen, roman, pyjama catshark, white steenbras and red steenbras.

== Historical and cultural heritage resources ==
A secondary function of a protected area may be the conservation of historical and cultural heritage resources, where they exist within its borders. The TMNPMPA includes several such resources, including historical shipwrecks, archaeological sites (shell middens), and paleontological sites, (stromatolites), and geological formations of scientific interest (Sea Point contact zone).

== Threats ==
This marine protected area suffers from both large scale and small scale poaching of fish, abalone and rock lobsters.

Other threats include pollutants from city rivers, storm water and sewage effluent that affect water quality, urban development; high tourist numbers, eutrophication and harmful algal blooms, pressures from small-scale fishers requiring greater access to marine resources, and invasive alien species.

=== Overexploitation and poaching ===
Poaching of abalone and lobster is prevalent as these are of high value and in high demand. South African abalone stocks are severely threatened as a result of long term over-exploitation and uncontrolled large-scale poaching, and ecological changes in parts of its distributional range. The illegal abalone trade was estimated to be almost double that of the legal trade in 2018.

There are two different main methods of small scale fish poaching: hand-line poaching and small group poaching. Hand-line poaching usually consists of two people and is considered a skill. Poachers know the type of fish based on the way the line is pulled. Small group poaching involves about 10-12 people fishing from boats. These groups are self-organized and often have informal rules governing where each group can fish. Small scale poaching exposes existing issues within local communities that use the marine protected area, including: lack of job diversity, lack of education, and lack of effective enforcement.

There is an additional risk that interactions with poachers can endanger staff and visitors, and adversely affect the local tourism economy.

Effective monitoring of MPA compliance is hindered by lack of sufficient suitable staff, but collaboration with other enforcement agencies such as the City of Cape Town Marine Unit, the South African Police Services Water-wing, and DFFE compliance can be helpful to manage compliance.

All legal fishing is done in terms of a license or permit in terms of the Marine Living Resources Act, but unsustainable levels of resource allocation by authorities have increased, and in combination with illegal fishing activities, threaten the survival of the affected species.

=== Climate change ===
Protected areas can be classified as resistant to climate change, resilient to climate change, or likely to change with the climate to a new state, but it is commonly unclear a priori as to which of these ways a given area will respond. Nevertheless, strategies to enhance resilience and help satisfactory transition are needed to help improve the chances of an satisfactory outcome. An obvious strategy is to minimise cumulative stressors, like habitat fragmentation and loss, pollution, overuse of resources and alien invasion. These can be mitigated to some extent by expanding the protected area so that some of the change can be absorbed more gradually and there is greater redundancy of habitats, allowing more options for localised migration. It is generally recognised by the community of climate change researchers that it will not be possible to maintain or restore historical conditions, and that supporting ecological change to avoid ecosystem collapse is the practicable goal.

=== Pollution ===
Oils spills, Plastic, Heavy metals, Sewage,

=== Invasive species ===
Invasive species are one of the biggest threats to a natural ecosystem, as they can cause complex and far reaching changes to the structure and dynamics of the communities, with a risk of severely affecting biodiversity. At least 58 alien species have been recorded in the TMNPMPA, and the number identified is likely to increase as further taxa are examined.

Simon's Town and Hout Bay harbours have many alien species, which is attributed to a high frequency of local and international vessel movement. Cape Town Harbour is just outside the MPA, and is one of the major ports on a major international shipping route.

At least two marine species that have become truly invasive affect this MPA - Carcinus maenas, the European shore crab, and Mytilus galloprovincialis, the Mediterranean mussel.

The main ecological effect of the Mediterranean mussel invasion has been the increase in the extent of mussel beds in the region, crowding out other species which would otherwise occupy the reef surface, particularly the limpet, Scutellastra argenvillei The extended mussel beds also increase habitat available for infaunal species and provide more food for some species, particularly the African oystercatcher (Haematopus moquini).

==== List of known invasive species ====
- Ectopleura larynx (Ellis & Solander, 1786): North Atlantic
- Caprella mutica Schurin, 1935: North-east Asia
- Mytilus galloprovincialis Lamarck, 1819: Mediterranean Sea
- Ficopomatus enigmaticus (Fauvel, 1923): Indian Ocean
- Clavelina lepadiformis (Müller, 1776): European waters
- Botryllus schlosseri (Pallas, 1766): Northeastern Atlantic
- Ascidiella aspersa (Müller, 1776): European waters
- Botryllus schlosseri (Pallas, 1766): European waters
- Ascidia sydneiensis Stimpson, 1855: Pacific Ocean
- Asterocarpa humilis (Heller, 1878), recorded as Cnemidocarpa humilis (Heller, 1878): Origin unknown
- Corella eumyota Traustedt, 1882: Cosmopolitan, origin unknown
- Cystodytes dellechiajei: Origin unknown
- Trididemnum cerebriforme:Indo-west-pacific
- Watersipora subtorquata: Caribbean
- Cryptosula pallasiana: European waters
- Bugula flabellata: Globally widespread
- Bugula neritina: Global in non-polar waters
- Bugula dentata: Indo-pacific
- Virididentula dentata: Indo-pacific
- Bugula neritina: Origin unknown
- Bugulina flabellata: Origin unknown
- Cladophora prolifera: Cosmopolitan
- Ulva fasciata: Widespread, origin unknown
- Ciona intestinalis: North Atlantic
- Cylista ornata (Holdsworth, 1855), recorded as Sagartia ornata: European waters
- Metridium senile: Northern hemisphere
- Obelia dichotoma: Cosmopolitan
- Corophium triaenonyx: Asian waters
- Melita zeylanica:Indian Ocean and Australian waters
- Monocorophium acherusicum: European waters
- Ericthonius punctatus (Spence Bate, 1857): North American waters
- Ericthonius brasiliensis (Dana, 1853): North Atlantic

=== Human-wildlife conflict ===
Conservation can be adversely affected by conflict between human users and wild animals.

== Research and monitoring ==
Formal research inside the MPA requires a permit issued for the project. Research proposals by external researchers must include outlines of research questions, methods, the anticipated study period, and any requirements for support from SANParks.

The proximity to several universities and research institutions in Cape Town has led to many studies of the ecology of the MPA and the organisms found in it, particularly those that are easily collected. Undergraduate projects are usually covered by a generalised permit to the universities from the DFFE. Other research and monitoring projects, including post-graduate research projects, must be registered with SANParks.

Since the MPA was declared, the number and variety of research projects has increased, but not all have been registered with SANParks through the Cape Research Centre. Most of the registered research has been on seabirds, with very little on governance and poaching.

A current project of the South African Council for Geoscience is to map the bathymetry of False Bay at metre to decimetre resolution. Surveys have been completed for Table Bay harbour approaches and the inshore waters of the MPA as far south as Hout Bay on the west coast. As of 2023, the survey continues in False Bay, mostly by Wreckless Marine, which is doing the deeper waters, and Council for Geoscience which is working the shallower areas to the northeast with a smaller vessel. Most of the data remains unpublished as of 2023.

Long-term ecological monitoring is necessary to inform planning and governance of MPAs, and to ensure that implementation follows plans. SANParks Research Strategy 2020 is the current guideline as of 2023. Other input comes from national and internal policies and priorities, gazetted objectives of protected areas and management plans.

Long-term ecological monitoring is necessary to understand factors driving changes in biodiversity and the effects of pressures on the functioning of the ecosystems, and is an essential part of effective resource management.

There are several long-term internal and external ecological monitoring projects registered with the Cape Research Centre. The CRC and TMNP rangers monitor fish and sharks using baited remote underwater video surveys, DFFE conducts benthic monitoring, the Seaweed unit at UCT continues to monitor seaweeds in the MPA, SAEON and SAIAB conduct oceanographic and ecological monitoring over the marine territory of South Africa in general, with a special focus on MPAs.

== Public perception ==
An independent survey in 2020 made with the purpose of identifying the value of the MPA as perceived by the recreational divers who use it, found mostly positive opinions on the value of the MPA as a tool for marine conservation, but also discovered a broad failure in communication between the management and users.

Recreational scuba diving is a popular coastal activity in the region, and is largely done in MPAs. In the case of the TMNPMPA, the large majority of reasonably accessible dive sites which have acceptable diving conditions enough of the time to support the local recreational diving industry are within the MPA, encouraging local divers to make extensive use of the sites throughout the year. The sites outside the MPA are fewer, with generally poorer visibility, and are more seasonal.

For management of an MPA to function effectively, it is necessary for the users to accept and generally comply with voluntary guidelines, codes of conduct, and terms of use which enable the conservation goals of the MPA, and therefore it is necessary that the users are informed and aware of these matters. The survey found that the divers lacked knowledge of the regulations, guidelines, and codes of conduct, and those who looked for the information could not find it, as it was not made available to the public even where it existed. A similar level of lack of information was found among the dive operators, for the same reasons. The regulations were available for those who searched them out, but not much else.

The survey concluded by recommending improved communication and collaboration between management and the diving community and other stakeholders, and provision of better access to information on management goals and expectations, but did not indicate whether such information and guidance actually existed in a published format.

== See also ==
Marine protected areas of South Africa

- Cape Peninsula – Rocky peninsula in the Western Cape, South Africa
- Cape Town – Legislative capital of South Africa
- False Bay – Bay of the Atlantic Ocean at South Africa
- Helderberg Marine Protected Area – Marine conservation area in the Western Cape in South Africa
- List of protected areas of South Africa
- Marine biodiversity of South Africa – Variety of living organisms that live in the seas off the coasts of South Africa
- Marine protected area – Protected areas of seas, oceans, estuaries or large lakes
- Marine protected areas of South Africa – Protected areas of coastline or ocean in the EEZ of South Africa
- Robben Island Marine Protected Area – Marine conservation area in South Africa
- Scuba diving tourism – Industry based on recreational diver travel
- Table Mountain National Park – Nature conservation area on the Cape Peninsula in Cape Town, South Africa
