= Robben Island Marine Protected Area =

Marine conservation area in South Africa

- Robben Island MPA location
- Location: Table Bay, South Africa
- Nearest city: Cape Town
- Coordinates: 33°49.5′S 18°12′E
- Area: 580 km^{2} (220 sq mi)
- Established: 2019
- Governing body: Department of Environment, Forestry and Fisheries (DEFF)
- Robben Island Marine Protected Area (South Africa)

The Robben Island Marine Protected Area is an inshore and offshore conservation region around and near Robben Island in Table Bay in the territorial waters of South Africa.

== Purpose ==
A marine protected area is defined by the IUCN as "a clearly defined geographical space, recognised, dedicated, and managed, through legal or other effective means, to achieve the long-term conservation of nature with associated ecosystem services and cultural values.".

The MPA is intended to provide safe nesting on the island for the endangered African Penguin, bank cormorants and terns, and to help the recovery of abalone and rock lobster stocks.

== Extent ==
The MPA protects the water column, the sea bed, and the subsoil inside its boundaries, shares a boundary with the northern part of the existing Table Mountain National Park Marine Protected Area. The area of sea protected is about 580 km^{2}.

=== Boundaries ===
The MPA is an offshore and inshore protected area adjacent to the Table Mountain National Park Marine Protected Area in the Western Cape. Its boundaries are:

- Northern boundary: S33°45’, E18°0’ to S33°45’, E18°24’
- Eastern boundary: S33°45’, E18°24’ to S33°54’, E18°24.06’
- Southern boundary: S33°54’, E18°24.06’ to S33°54’, E18°0’
- Western boundary: S33°54’, E18°0’ to S33°45’, E18°0’

=== Zonation ===
There are one restricted zone and two controlled zones in the MPA.

==== Restricted areas ====
The boundaries of the Robben Island restricted zone are:

- Northern boundary: S33°47.58’, E18°12.12’ to S33°47.58’, E18°21.72’
- Eastern boundary: S33°47.58’, E18°21.72’ to S33°54’, E18°21.72’
- Southern boundary: S33°54’, E18°21.72’ to S33°54’, E18°12.12’
- Western boundary: S33°54’, E18°12.12’ to S33°47.58’, E18°12.12’

==== Controlled areas ====
The boundaries of Robben Island controlled zone 1 are:

- Northern boundary: S33°45’, E18°0’ to S33°45’, E18°24’
- Eastern boundary: S33°45’, E18°24’ to S33°54’, E18°24.06’
- Eastern panhandle southern boundary: S33°54’, E18°24.06’ to S33°54’, E18°21.72’
- Eastern panhandle western boundary: S33°54’, E18°21.72’ to S33°47.58’, E18°21.72’ (shared with restricted zone)
- Central southern boundary: S33°47.58’, E18°21.72’ to S33°47.58’, E18°12.12’ (shared with restricted zone)
- Main part eastern boundary: S33°47.58’, E18°12.12’ to S33°54’, E18°12.12’ (shared with restricted zone)
- Main part southern boundary: S33°54’, E18°12.12’ to S33°54’, E18°0’
- Western boundary: S33°54’, E18°0’ back to S33°45’, E18°0’

The boundaries of Robben Island controlled zone 2 are:

- Northern boundary: S33°46.38’, E18°20.58’ to S33°46.38’, E18°24’
- Eastern boundary: S33°46.38’, E18°24’ to S33°50.16’, E18°24’
- Southern boundary: S33°50.16’, E18°24’ to S33°50.22’, E18°21.72’
- Western boundary: S33°50.22’, E18°21.72’ to S33°47.58’, E18°21.72’
- Panhandle southern boundary: S33°47.58’, E18°21.72’ to S33°47.58’, E18°20.58’
- Panhandle western boundary: S33°47.58’, E18°20.58’ to S33°46.38’, E18°20.58’

Controlled zone 2 is inside controlled zone 1.

== Management ==
The marine protected areas of South Africa are the responsibility of the national government, which has management agreements with a variety of MPA management authorities with funding from the SA Government through the Department of Environmental Affairs (DEA).

The Department of Agriculture, Forestry and Fisheries is responsible for issuing permits, quotas and law enforcement.

== Use ==
=== Scuba diving ===
A small number of recreational dive sites fall within the MPA, including several wrecks. There are also rocky reefs, but the reefs of the adjacent Table Mountain National Park Marine Protected Area are more popular due to greater biodiversity, more interesting topography and easier access. The Tygerberg formation sandstones and shales form relatively flat reefs and do not provide the granite corestone landforms found further south.

==== Named dive sites ====
- Robben Island steamer wreck: S33°49.886′, E018°21.524′
- MV Afrikaner: S33°50.0′ E018°20.5′
- Whale Rock: S33°50.112′ E018°22.858'
- SS Hypatia: S33°50.10’ E018°22.90’
- MV Daeyang Family: S33°50.388′ E18°23.133′
- MV Gemsbok: S33°53.0′ E018°20.5′
- SS SA Seafarer: S33°53.80’ E018°23.80’

== Geography ==
=== Climate ===
The climate of the South-western Cape is markedly different from the rest of South Africa, which is a summer rainfall region, receiving most of its rainfall during the summer months of December to February. The South-western Cape has a Mediterranean type climate, with most of its rainfall during the winter months from June to September.

During the summer the dominant factor determining the weather in the region is a high pressure zone, known as the Atlantic High, located over the South Atlantic oOean to the west of the Cape cCast. Winds circulating in an anticlockwise direction from such a system reach the Cape from the south-east, producing periods of up to several days of high winds and mostly clear skies. These winds keep the region relatively cool. Because of its south facing aspect, Betty's Bay is exposed to these winds.

Winter in the south-western Cape is characterised by disturbances in the circumpolar westerly winds, resulting in a series of eastward moving depressions. These bring cool cloudy weather and rain from the north west. The south westerly winds over the South Atlantic produce the prevailing south-westerly swell typical of the winter months, which beat on the exposed coastline.

== Ecology ==
Marine ecoregions of the South African Exclusive Economic Zone: Robben Island Marine Protected Area is in the Benguela ecoregion.

The MPA is in the cool temperate Benguela ecoregion to the west of Cape Point which extends northwards to the Orange River. There are a moderate proportion of species endemic to South Africa along this coastline.

Four major habitats exist in the sea in this region, three of them distinguished by the nature of the substrate. The substrate, or base material, is important in that it provides a base to which an organism can anchor itself, which is vitally important for those organisms which need to stay in one particular kind of place. Rocky shores and reefs provide a firm fixed substrate for the attachment of plants and animals. Some of these may have kelp forests, which reduce the effect of waves and provide food and shelter for an extended range of organisms. Sandy beaches and bottoms are a relatively unstable substrate and cannot anchor kelp or many of the other benthic organisms. Finally there is open water, above the substrate and clear of the kelp forest, where the organisms must drift or swim. Mixed habitats are also frequently found, which are a combination of those mentioned above. There are no significant estuarine habitats in the MPA.

Rocky shores and reefs
There are rocky reefs and mixed rocky and sandy bottoms. For many marine organisms the substrate is another type of marine organism, and it is common for several layers to co-exist. Examples of this are red bait pods, which are usually encrusted with sponges, ascidians, bryozoans, anemones, and gastropods, and abalone, which are usually covered by similar seaweeds to those found on the surrounding rocks, usually with a variety of other organisms living on the seaweeds.

The type of rock of the reef is of some importance, as it influences the range of possibilities for the local topography, which in turn influences the range of habitats provided, and therefore the diversity of inhabitants. Sandstone and other sedimentary rocks erode and weather very differently, and depending on the direction of dip and strike, and steepness of the dip, may produce reefs which are relatively flat to very high profile and full of small crevices. These features may be at varying angles to the shoreline and wave fronts. There are fewer large holes, tunnels and crevices in sandstone reefs, but often many deep but low near-horizontal crevices.

Kelp forests
Kelp forests are a variation of rocky reefs, as the kelp requires a fairly strong and stable substrate which can withstand the loads of repeated waves dragging on the kelp plants. The sea bamboo Ecklonia maxima grows in water which is shallow enough to allow it to reach to the surface with its gas-filled stipes, so that the fronds form a dense layer at or just below the surface, depending on the tide. The shorter split-fan kelp Laminaria pallida grows mostly on deeper reefs, where there is not so much competition from the sea bamboo. Both these kelp species provide food and shelter for a variety of other organisms, particularly the sea bamboo, which is a base for a wide range of epiphytes, which in turn provide food and shelter for more organisms.

Sandy beaches and bottoms (including shelly, pebble and gravel bottoms)
Sandy bottoms at first glance appear to be fairly barren areas, as they lack the stability to support many of the spectacular reef based species, and the variety of large organisms is relatively low. The sand is continually being moved around by wave action, to a greater or lesser degree depending on weather conditions and exposure of the area. This means that sessile organisms must be specifically adapted to areas of relatively loose substrate to thrive in them, and the variety of species found on a sandy or gravel bottom will depend on all these factors. Sandy bottoms have one important compensation for their instability, animals can burrow into the sand and move up and down within its layers, which can provide feeding opportunities and protection from predation. Other species can dig themselves holes in which to shelter, or may feed by filtering water drawn through the tunnel, or by extending body parts adapted to this function into the water above the sand.

The open sea
The pelagic water column is the major part of the living space at sea. This is the water between the surface and the top of the benthic zone, where living organisms swim, float or drift, and the food chain starts with phytoplankton, the mostly microscopic photosynthetic organisms that convert the energy of sunlight into organic material which feeds nearly everything else, directly or indirectly. In temperate seas there are distinct seasonal cycles of phytoplankton growth, based on the available nutrients and the available sunlight. Either can be a limiting factor. Phytoplankton tend to thrive where there is plenty of light, and they themselves are a major factor in restricting light penetration to greater depths, so the photosynthetic zone tends to be shallower in areas of high productivity. Zooplankton feed on the phytoplankton, and are in turn eaten by larger animals. The larger pelagic animals are generally faster moving and more mobile, giving them the option of changing depth to feed or to avoid predation, and to move to other places in search of a better food supply.

=== Marine species diversity ===
==== Seaweeds ====
- Ecklonia maxima (sea bamboo)
- Laminaria pallida (split-fan kelp)
- Macrocystis pyrifera (bladder kelp)

==== Endemism ====
The MPA is in the cool temperate Benguela ecoregion to the west of Cape Point which extends northwards to the Orange River. There are a moderate proportion of species endemic to South Africa along this coastline.

== See also ==
Marine protected areas of South Africa
- List of protected areas of South Africa
- Marine protected areas of South Africa – Protected areas of coastline or ocean in the EEZ of South Africa
