= Harmeria =

Scientific classification
- Kingdom: Animalia
- Phylum: Bryozoa
- Class: Gymnolaemata
- Order: Cheilostomatida
- Family: Cryptosulidae
- Genus: Harmeria; Norman, 1903
- Species: H. scutulata

Binomial name
- Harmeria scutulata (Busk, 1855)

Genus of bryozoans

Harmeria is a monotypic genus of bryozoans belonging to the family Cryptosulidae. The only species is Harmeria scutulata.

The species is found in Northern Europe, Northern America, southernmost Southern America.
