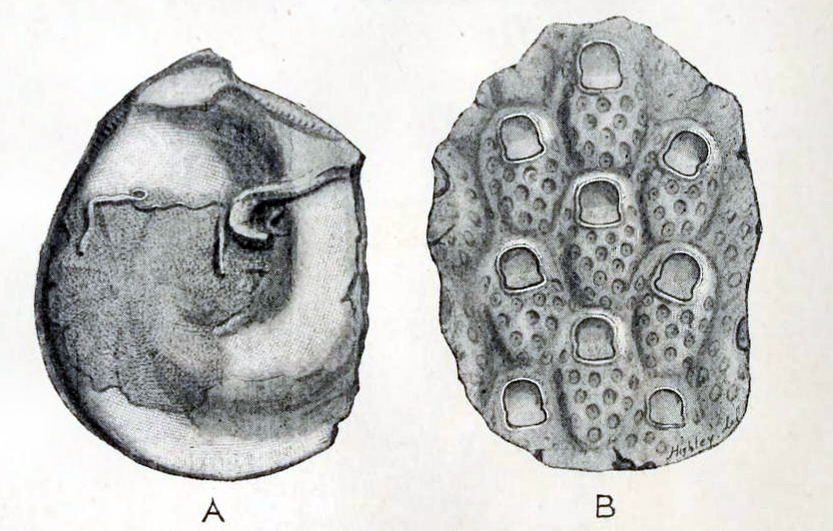

Scientific classification
- Kingdom: Animalia
- Phylum: Bryozoa
- Class: Gymnolaemata
- Order: Cheilostomatida
- Family: Cryptosulidae
- Genus: Cryptosula; Canu & Bassler, 1925

= Cryptosula =

Genus of bryozoans

Cryptosula is a genus of bryozoans belonging to the family Cryptosulidae.

The genus has almost cosmopolitan distribution.

Species:

- Cryptosula cylindrica Calvet, 1931
- Cryptosula okadai Dick & Ross, 1988
- Cryptosula pallasiana (Moll, 1803)
- Cryptosula reticulata (Okada, 1929)
- Cryptosula terebrata (Sinzov, 1892)
- Cryptosula zavjalovensis Kubanin, 1976
