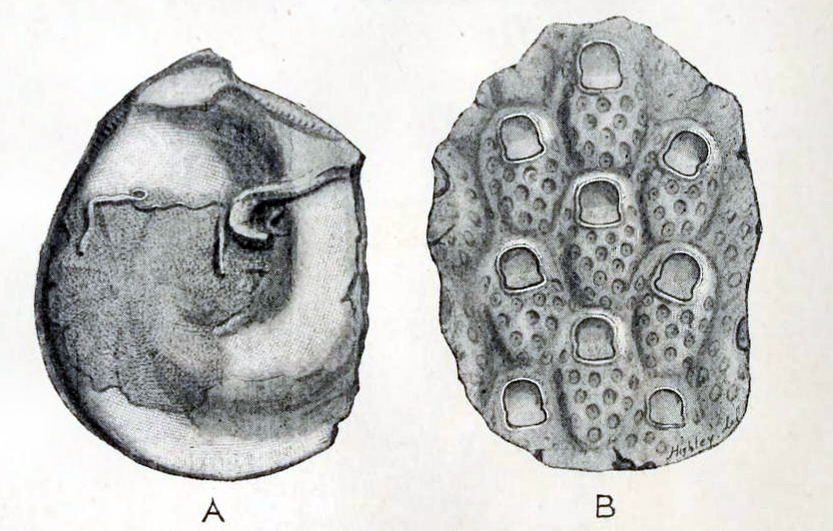
- Cryptosula pallasiana

Scientific classification
- Kingdom: Animalia
- Phylum: Bryozoa
- Class: Gymnolaemata
- Order: Cheilostomatida
- Family: Cryptosulidae

= Cryptosulidae =

Family of bryozoans

Cryptosulidae is a family of bryozoans belonging to the order Cheilostomatida.

Genera:

- Cryptosula Canu & Bassler, 1925
- Harmeria Norman, 1903
