= Sea Point contact zone =

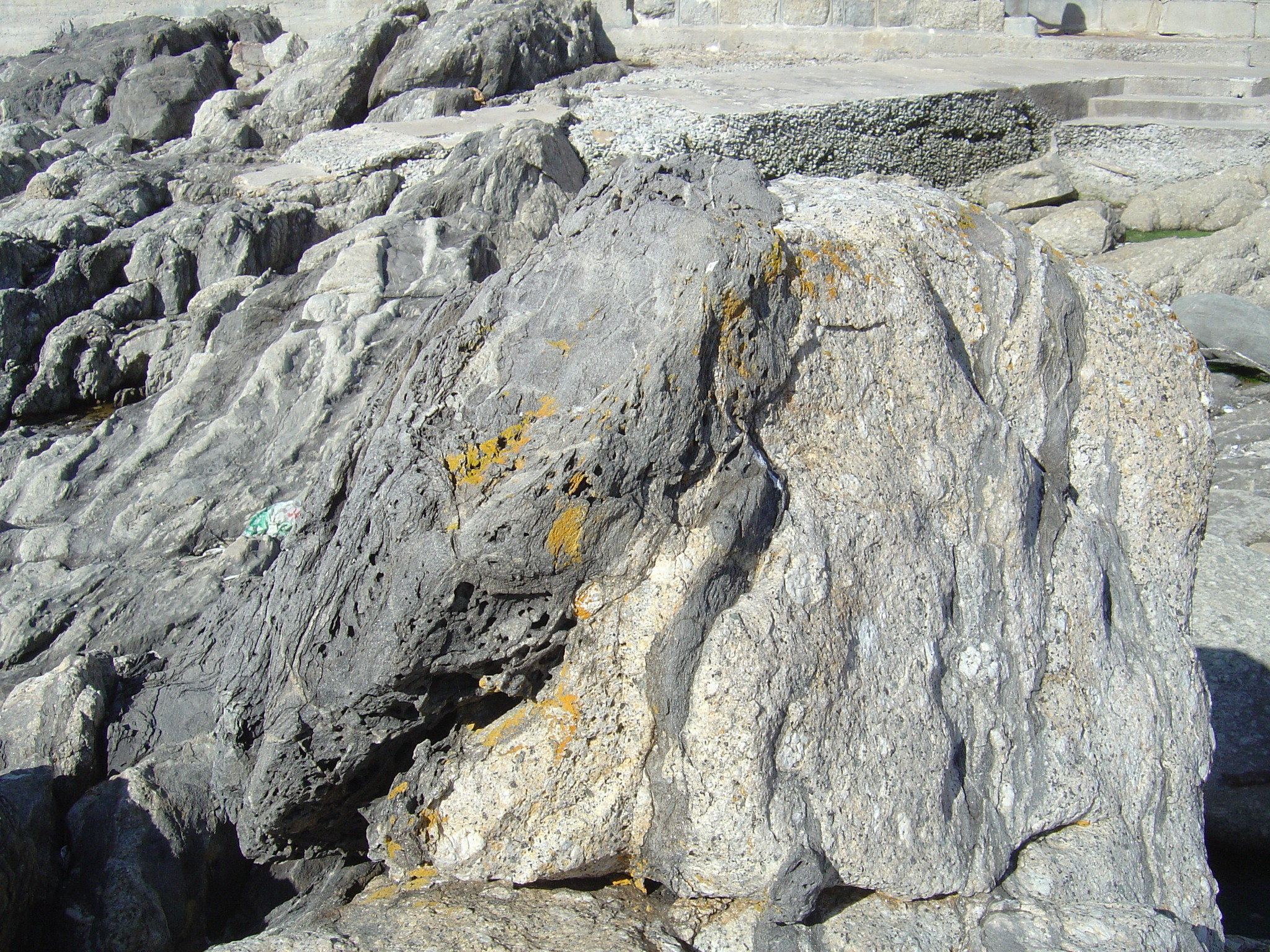
Mixed rocks that form part of the Sea Point contact zone.

The Sea Point contact zone is a geologic boundary where the Malmesbury Group was intruded by molten granite, and can be seen at Sea Point. It extends over a width of about 150 meters. The Sea Point contact was first described in 1818 by the British naturalist Clark Abel. It was later made famous by Charles Darwin during his voyage of scientific discovery on H.M.S. Beagle.

Here, slivers of dark coloured Malmesbury rocks, altered by intense heat are intermingled and folded with the pale coloured intrusive granite to form a complex mixed rock. Large feldspar crystals occur in both the granite and dark hornfels layers.

Though initially intruded at great depth, prolonged erosion eventually exposed the granite at the surface and it and what remains of the similarly eroded Malmesbury group now form a basement upon which younger sedimentary rocks of the Table Mountain Group were deposited.

The Sea Point contact zone was declared a national monument in 1953.
