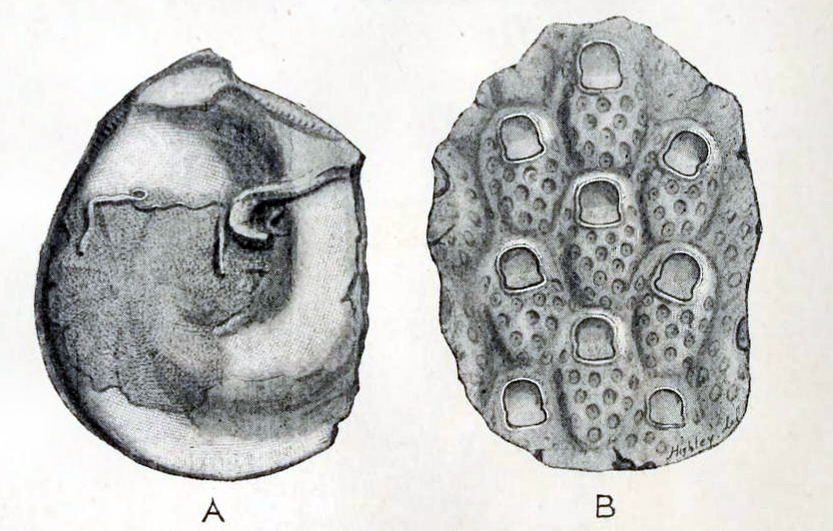

Scientific classification
- Kingdom: Animalia
- Phylum: Bryozoa
- Class: Gymnolaemata
- Order: Cheilostomatida
- Family: Cryptosulidae
- Genus: Cryptosula
- Species: C. pallasiana

Binomial name
- Cryptosula pallasiana (Moll, 1803)

Synonyms
- Cribrilina pallasiana Moll, 1803; Eschara pallasiana Moll, 1803; Lepralia pallasiana (Moll, 1803)

= Cryptosula pallasiana =

Species of moss animal

Cryptosula pallasiana is a species of colonial bryozoan in the order Cheilostomatida. It is native to the Atlantic Ocean where it occurs in northwestern Europe and northern Africa, and the eastern seaboard of North America. It has been accidentally introduced to the western coast of North America and to other parts of the world.

== Description ==
Cryptosula pallasiana is an encrusting colonial bryozoan with colonies growing to roughly circular patches with diameters of a few centimetres. Each colony consists of a number of individual organisms called zooids. Each zooid lies in a rigid rectangular box called a zooecium up to 1 mm (0.04 in) long and 0.5 mm (0.02 in) wide. These are fitted together in a regular pattern, radiating out from the position in which the founding zooid settled to start the colony, each daughter zooid's head being further away from the centre of the colony than its foot. The upper surface of the zooecium has an opening called the aperture at the head end, and through this the zooid's lophophore is extended to feed. The aperture is a round-cornered square and there are pores in the upper surface of the zooecium both above and below it. The colonies are white, beige, pink or orange.

== Distribution ==
Cryptosula pallasiana is native to the North Atlantic Ocean. On the east side its range extends from Norway and the United Kingdom to the Mediterranean Sea, the Black Sea and Morocco. On the west side it ranges from Nova Scotia to Florida. It was first recorded in the Pacific Ocean in the 1940s, first in San Francisco Bay and Newport Bay (California), and later in other parts of California, British Columbia, Washington and Oregon. By the 1960s it had been reported from Japan, Hawaii, New Zealand, Australia, Argentina and Chile. It is a fouling organism and it is thought that it has spread on the hulls of vessels, and possibly with the transfer of oysters or other shellfish.

== Ecology ==
This species grows in shallow water on many kinds of hard surface including rocks, pilings, docks, breakwaters, seaweed, sea grasses, shellfish, floating debris and the hulls of ships. Other invertebrates and juvenile fish find suitable habitat around the colonies. The zooids feed by extending their lophophores and filter feeding, extracting particles less than 0.045 mm (0.002 in) in diameter from the water. The sea slug Okenia eolida feeds on fouling bryozoans including C. pallasiana, and has been transported around the world with them.
