= Council for Geoscience =

South African national science council

Agency overview
- Preceding agencies: Geological Survey of South Africa; Geological Commission of the Cape of Good Hope
- Headquarters: 280 Pretoria Street, Silverton, Pretoria,
- Agency executives: Mosa Mabuza, Chief Executive Officer; Leonard Matsepe, Chief Financial Officer; Jonty Tshipa, Executive Manager : Corporate Services; Refilwe Shelembe, Executive Manager : Geological Resources; David Khoza, Executive Manager : Applied Geoscience
- Website: http://www.geoscience.org.za/

The Council for Geoscience (CGS) is a National Science Council of South Africa.

== History ==
The Council for Geoscience was established in terms of the Geoscience Act, No. 100 of 1993, as the successor to the Geological Survey of South Africa, which was formed in 1912 by combining three existing organisations. The oldest of these was the Geological Commission of the Cape of Good Hope, which was founded in 1895.

== Function ==
The CGS is a scientific research council to provide and promote research in the field of geoscience and to provide specialised geoscientific services. The head office is in Pretoria, and there are regional offices in Polokwane in Limpopo, Cape Town in the Western Cape, Pietermaritzburg & Durban in KwaZulu-Natal, Port Elizabeth in the Eastern Cape and Upington in the Northern Cape.

Services provided by the Council for Geoscience include:

- Airborne and ground geophysical surveys,
- Airborne and ground acquisition of geophysical data, processing and interpretation,
- Engineering geoscience and geotechnical services,
- Mineral resources development and mining and minerals services,
- Water geoscience and hydrological services,
- Environmental management and rehabilitation,
- Marine geology, including port surveys,
- Spatial data and GIS Services,
- Regional geological surveys and map compilations
- Core drilling services

The Council for Geoscience is the national custodian of aeromagnetic, radiometric and gravity coverage of South Africa.
