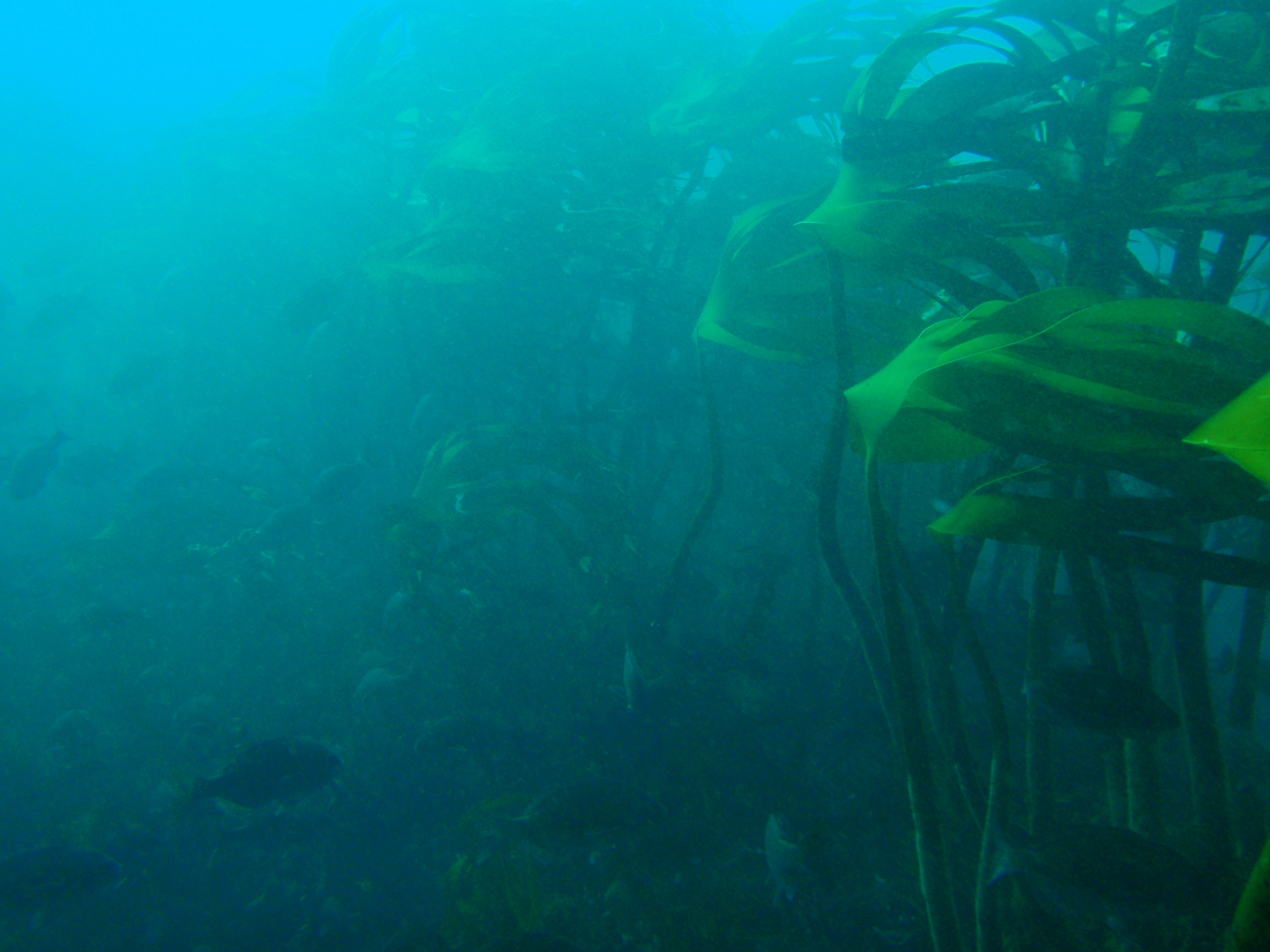
- Laminaria pallida off the Cape Peninsula west coast

Scientific classification
- Domain: Eukaryota
- Clade: Sar
- Clade: Stramenopiles
- Division: Ochrophyta
- Class: Phaeophyceae
- Order: Laminariales
- Family: Laminariaceae
- Genus: Laminaria
- Species: L. pallida

Binomial name
- Laminaria pallida Greville ex J, Agardh 1848

= Laminaria pallida =

Split-fan kelp

Large species of brown seaweed from the west coast of southern Africa

Laminaria pallida, the split-fan kelp, is a species of large brown seaweed of the class Phaeophyceae found from Danger Point on the south coast of South Africa to Port Nolloth, Tristan da Cunha and Gough islands in the Atlantic and Île Saint-Paul in the Indian Ocean.

== Description ==
The large thallus is up to 10m long, with a single smooth broad blade which splits into several parallel longitudinal straps. The holdfast is multiply branched, and the stipe is usually solid, fairly stiff, round in section and tapers gradually toward the blade. In specimens with hollow stipes the stipe narrows towards the base.

== Distribution ==
Danger Point on the south coast of South Africa to Port Nolloth in Namibia, Tristan da Cunha and Gough islands in the Atlantic and St Paul Island in the Indian Ocean.

Type locality: Table Bay, Cape Province, South Africa (Silva, Basson & Moe 1996: 641).

== Ecology ==
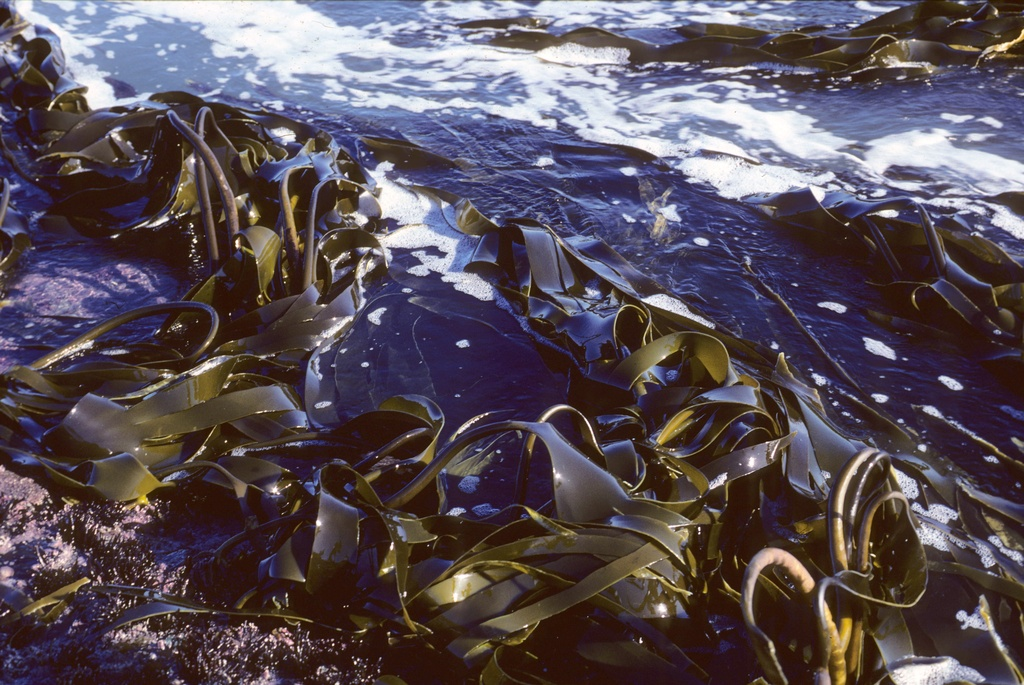
Laminaria pallida, Namibia, in intertidal or shallow subtidal zone

Commonly found below a canopy of the Sea bamboo Ecklonia maxima down to 15 m, and replaces it in deeper water to 30 m the frond tips sweep the surrounding reef surface, reducing the numbers of animals that may eat sporelings.
