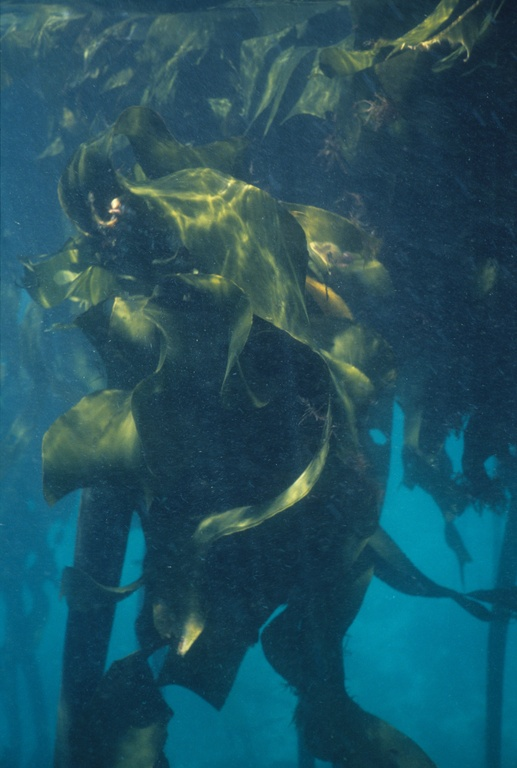
- Ecklonia maxima

Scientific classification
- Domain: Eukaryota
- Clade: Sar
- Clade: Stramenopiles
- Division: Ochrophyta
- Class: Phaeophyceae
- Order: Laminariales
- Family: Lessoniaceae
- Genus: Ecklonia
- Species: E. maxima

Binomial name
- Ecklonia maxima (Osbeck) Papenfuss, 1940

Synonyms
- Ecklonia buccinalis (Linnaeus) Hornemann, 1828; Fucus buccinalis Linnaeus, 1771; Fucus maximus Osbeck, 1757; Laminaria buccinalis (Linnaeus) J.V.Lamouroux, 1813; Laminaria buccinalis var. macloviana Bory de Saint-Vincent, 1828; Laminaria flabellum Bory de Saint-Vincent, 1825

= Ecklonia maxima =

Species of alga

Ecklonia maxima, or sea bamboo, is a species of kelp native to the southern oceans. It is typically found along the southern Atlantic coast of Africa, from the very south of South Africa to northern Namibia. In these areas the species dominates the shallow, temperate water, reaching a depth of up to 8 metres (26 ft) in the offshore kelp forests.

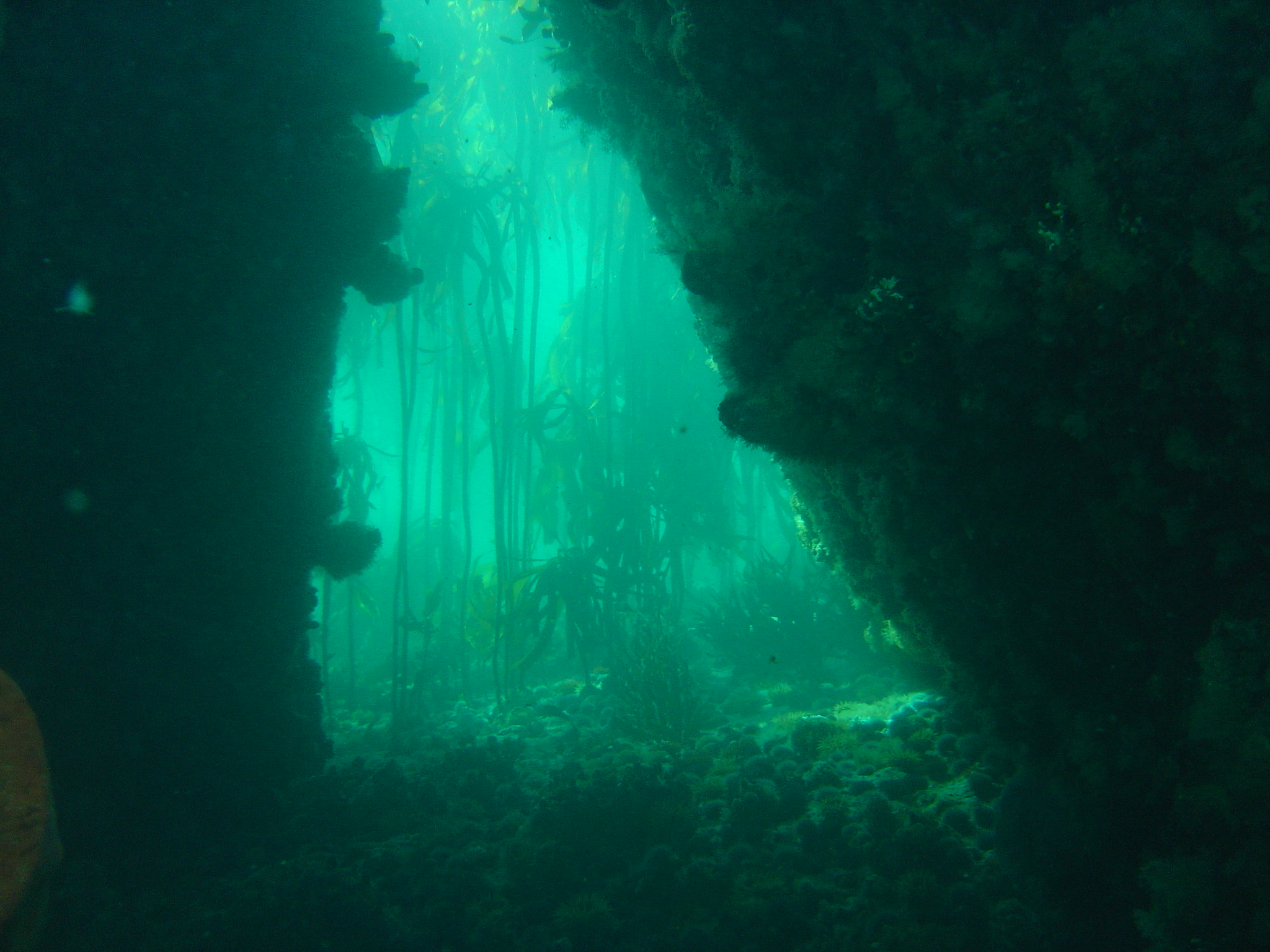
Kelp forest seen from below,

The kelp anchors itself by attaching itself to a rock or other kelp via its holdfast. From this root-like structure a single long stipe rises to the surface waters, where a large pneumatocyst keeps a tangle of blades at the surface to aid photosynthesis.

The species is of economic importance as it is harvested for both an agricultural supplement and as food for farmed abalone.
