= List of protected areas of South Africa =

The protected areas of South Africa include national parks and marine protected areas managed by the national government, public nature reserves managed by provincial and local governments, and private nature reserves managed by private landowners. Most protected areas are intended for the conservation of flora and fauna. National parks are maintained by South African National Parks (SANParks). A number of national parks have been incorporated in transfrontier conservation areas.

Protected areas may also be protected for their value and importance as historical, cultural heritage or scientific sites. More information on these can be found in the list of heritage sites in South Africa.

== Special Nature Reserves ==
Special nature reserves are highly protected areas from which all people and human activities are excluded, except for conservation and scientific research. The Prince Edward Islands, which are South African territories in the Southern Ocean, have been declared as a special nature reserve.

== National Parks ==
The following are the national parks of South Africa:

- Addo Elephant National Park – Wildlife conservation park near Gqeberha in the Eastern Cape, South Africa
- Agulhas National Park – Park in South Africa
- Augrabies Falls National Park – National park in the Northern Cape, South Africa
- Bontebok National Park – National park near Swellendam in the Western Cape, South Africa
- Camdeboo National Park – National park at Graaff-Reinet in the Eastern Cape, South Africa
- Garden Route National Park – Coastal national park in South Africa
- Golden Gate Highlands National Park – National park in South Africa
- Grassland National Park – South African national park in the Eastern Cape
- Karoo National Park – Wildlife reserve in the Western Cape, South Africa
- Kgalagadi Transfrontier Park – Transfrontier conservation area in Botswana and South Africa (shared with Botswana)
- Kruger National Park – First national park in South Africa
- Mapungubwe National Park – National park in Limpopo, South Africa
- Marakele National Park – National park in Limpopo Province, South Africa
- Meerkat National Park – National park in the Northern Cape, South Africa (visitors not allowed)
- Mokala National Park – Protected area in the Northern Cape, South Africa
- Mountain Zebra National Park – National park in the Eastern Cape province of South Africa
- Namaqua National Park – South African national park in Namaqualand in the Northern Cape
- Table Mountain National Park – Nature conservation area on the Cape Peninsula in Cape Town, South Africa
- Tankwa Karoo National Park – Conservation area west of Sutherland in the Western and Northern Cape
- West Coast National Park – Nature reserve north of Cape Town in the Western Cape province of South Africa
- ǀAi-ǀAis/Richtersveld Transfrontier Park – Transfrontier park in Namibia and South Africa (shared with Namibia)

== Transfrontier conservation areas ==
South Africa is involved in the following transfrontier conservation areas (TFCAs), also known as "peace parks".

- Ai-Ais/Richtersveld Transfrontier Park – Transfrontier park in Namibia and South Africa – includes the Richtersveld in South Africa and the Fish River Canyon and Ai-Ais Hot Springs in Namibia
- Great Limpopo Transfrontier Park – Transfrontier park in South Africa, Mozambique and Zimbabwe – includes Kruger National Park and parks in Mozambique and Zimbabwe
- Kgalagadi Transfrontier Park – Transfrontier conservation area in Botswana and South Africa – includes the former Kalahari Gemsbok National Park in South Africa and Gemsbok National Park and Mabuasehube Game Reserve in Botswana
- Maloti-Drakensberg Transfrontier Conservation Area – International park in Lesotho and South Africa – includes Golden Gate Highlands National Park, Sterkfontein Dam Nature Reserve, uKhahlamba Drakensberg Park and Royal Natal National Park in South Africa, and Sehlabathebe National Park in Lesotho
- Greater Mapungubwe Transfrontier Conservation Area – Transfrontier conservation area in South Africa, Botswana and Zimbabwe – Mapungubwe National Park in South Africa, Northern Tuli Game Reserve in Botswana, and Tuli Circle Safari Area in Zimbabwe
- Nsubane Pongola Transfrontier Conservation Area – Proposed protected area in South Africa and Swaziland – including Phongolo Nature Reserve in South Africa and various farms in Swaziland
- Songimvelo-Malolotja Transfrontier Conservation Area – Peace park on the South Africa - Swaziland border between Barberton and Pigg's Peak – including Songimvelo Game Reserve in South Africa and Malolotja Nature Reserve in Swaziland
- Usuthu-Tembe-Futi Transfrontier Conservation Area – Group of protected areas in southern Africa – including Ndumo Game Reserve and Tembe Elephant Park in South Africa, Maputo Special Reserve in Mozambique, and Usuthu Gorge Conservancy in Swaziland.

The Lubombo Transfrontier Conservation Area, involving South Africa, Mozambique and Swaziland, is planned to be formed from the iSimangaliso Wetland Park and the Nsubane Pongola, Songimvelo-Malolotja and Usuthu-Tembe-Futi TFCAs.

== Marine Protected Areas ==
Marine protected areas of South Africa

- Addo Elephant National Park Marine Protected Area – Marine conservation area in South Africa (Eastern Cape)
- Agulhas Bank Complex Marine Protected Area – Offshore marine conservation area south of Cape Agulhas in South Africa (Western Cape)
- Agulhas Front Marine Protected Area – Offshore marine conservation area off the Eastern Cape in South Africa's EEZ (Eastern Cape)
- Agulhas Muds Marine Protected Area – Marine conservation area offshore of the Western Cape in South Africa (Western Cape)
- Aliwal Shoal Marine Protected Area – Marine conservation area at Aliwal Shoal off the coast of KwaZulu-Natal, South Africa (KwaZulu-Natal)
- Amathole Offshore Marine Protected Area – Marine conservation area in the Eastern Cape in South Africa
- Benguela Muds Marine Protected Area – Marine conservation area off the Western Cape province of South Africa
- Betty's Bay Marine Protected Area – Marine conservation area in the Western Cape in South Africa (Western Cape)
- Bird Island Marine Protected Area – Marine conservation area in the Eastern Cape in South Africa (Eastern Cape)
- Browns Bank Corals Marine Protected Area – Marine conservation area on the continental slope of South Africa
- Cape Canyon Marine Protected Area – Marine conservation area off the coast of South Africa (Western Cape)
- Childs Bank Marine Protected Area – Marine conservation area off the west coast of South Africa
- De Hoop Marine Protected Area – Marine conservation area on the coast of South Africa (Western Cape)
- Dwesa-Cwebe Marine Protected Area – Coastal marine conservation area in the Eastern Cape, South Africa (Eastern Cape)
- Goukamma Marine Protected Area – Marine conservation area the Western Cape in South Africa (Western Cape)
- Helderberg Marine Protected Area – Marine conservation area in the Western Cape in South Africa (Western Cape)
- Hluleka Marine Protected Area – Marine conservation area in the Eastern Cape in South Africa (Eastern Cape)
- iSimangaliso Marine Protected Area – Marine conservation area in northern kwaZulu-Natal in South Africa (KwaZulu-Natal)
- Jutten Island Marine Protected Area – Marine conservation area in Saldanha Bay in South Africa (Western Cape)
- Langebaan Lagoon Marine Protected Area – Marine conservation area in South Africa (Western Cape)
- Malgas Island Marine Protected Area – Marine conservation area in South Africa (Western Cape)
- Marcus Island Marine Protected Area – Marine conservation area in the Western Cape in South Africa (Western Cape)
- Prince Edward Islands Marine Protected Area – Indian Ocean region in South Africa's EEZ (Southern Ocean)
- Namaqua Fossil Forest Marine Protected Area – Marine conservation area off South Africa (Northern Cape)
- Namaqua National Park Marine Protected Area – Marine conservation area in Namaqualand in the Northern Cape, in South Africa (Northern Cape)
- Orange Shelf Edge Marine Protected Area – Marine conservation area off the Northern Cape in South Africa (Northern Cape)
- Pondoland Marine Protected Area – Marine conservation area in the Eastern Cape province of South Africa (KwaZulu-Natal)
- Port Elizabeth Corals Marine Protected Area – Marine conservation area off the Eastern Cape in South Africa (Eastern Cape)
- Prince Edward Islands Marine Protected Area – Indian Ocean region in South Africa's EEZ (Prince Edward Islands)
- Protea Banks Marine Protected Area – Marine conservation area in KwaZulu-Natal, South Africa (KwaZulu-Natal)
- Robben Island Marine Protected Area – Marine conservation area in South Africa (Western Cape)
- Robberg Marine Protected Area – Coastal conservation area in the Western Cape of South Africa (Western Cape)
- Sardinia Bay Marine Protected Area – Marine conservation area in the Eastern Cape in South Africa (Eastern Cape)
- Sixteen Mile Beach Marine Protected Area – Marine conservation area the Western Cape in South Africa (Western Cape)
- Southeast Atlantic Seamounts Marine Protected Area – Marine conservation area in the South Atlantic in the South African EEZ (Western Cape)
- Southwest Indian Seamounts Marine Protected Area – Marine conservation area south of Stilbaai in the Western Cape in South Africa
- Stilbaai Marine Protected Area – Marine conservation area in the Western Cape in South Africa (Western Cape)
- Table Mountain National Park Marine Protected Area – Marine conservation area around the Cape Peninsula in South Africa (Western Cape)
- Trafalgar Marine Protected Area – Marine conservation area (in region) in South Africa (Eastern Cape)
- Tsitsikamma Marine Protected Area – Marine conservation area on the south coast of South Africa (Eastern Cape)
- uThukela Banks Marine Protected Area – Marine conservation area off the coast of kwaZulu-Natal in South Africa (KwaZulu-Natal)
- Walker Bay Whale Sanctuary – Marine conservation area in the Western Cape province in South Africa (Western Cape)

== Ramsar Sites ==
There are 30 designated Ramsar sites in South Africa:

- Barberspan
- Berg Estuary – River in the Western Cape, South Africa
- Blesbokspruit – River in South Africa
- Bot - Kleinmond Estuarine System – Section of the Bot-Kleinmond Estuarine System
- Dassen Island Nature Reserve – Ramsar site island in South Africa
- De Berg Nature Reserve
- De Hoop Vlei – Nature reserve in the Western Cape, South Africa
- De Mond – Nature reserve in Western Cape, South Africa
- Dyer Island Nature Reserve Complex – Protected islets off the coast of Gansbaai, South Africa
- False Bay Nature Reserve
- Ingula Nature Reserve
- Kgaswane Mountain Reserve – Ramsar site reserve within the Magaliesberg Biosphere, North West, South Africa
- Kosi Bay – Group of lakes in Maputaland, KwaZulu-Natal, South Africa
- Lake Sibhayi – Lake in KwaZulu-Natal, South Africa
- Langebaan Lagoon – Marine conservation area in South Africa
- Makuleke Wetlands
- Middelpunt Nature Reserve
- Natal Drakensberg Park – Part of a world heritage site in KwaZulu-Natal, South Africa
- Ndumo Game Reserve – South African game reserve in Maputaland
- Ntsikeni Nature Reserve – South African wetlands area
- Nylsvley Nature Reserve – Nature reserve in Limpopo Province, South Africa
- Orange River Mouth – Major river in southern Africa
- Prince Edward Islands – Two small subantarctic islands belonging to South Africa
- Seekoeivlei Nature Reserve – Wetland reserve in the Free State, South Africa
- St Lucia System – South Africa's third-largest protected area, spanning 280 km of coastline
- Turtle Beaches / Coral Reefs of Tongaland – Marine conservation area in northern kwaZulu-Natal in South Africa
- Verloren Valei Nature Reserve – Protected area of South Africa
- Verlorenvlei – River in the Western Cape, South Africa
- Wilderness Lakes
- uMgeni Vlei Nature Reserve – Protected Ramsar wetland in KZN, South Africa

== World Heritage Sites ==
World heritage sites in South Africa are protected by the World Heritage Convention Act (Act 49 of 1999). These include:

- Fossil Hominid sites and environs of:
  - Sterkfontein – Archaeological site in Gauteng, South Africa
  - Swartkrans – Fossil-bearing cave in South Africa
  - Kromdraai – Protected conservation park in South Africa
- Baviaanskloof Wilderness Areas – Conservation area in Eastern Cape, South Africa
- Cape Floral Region – Smallest of the six recognised floral kingdoms of the world Protected Areas
- iSimangaliso Wetland Park – South Africa's third-largest protected area, spanning 280 km of coastline
- Mapungubwe – Ancient kingdom in the Limpopo-Shashe Basin, northern South Africa Cultural Landscape
- Richtersveld – Desert in South Africa Cultural and Botanical Landscape
- Robben Island – Island in Table Bay, South Africa
- uKhahlamba/Drakensberg – Mountain range in South Africa Park
- Vredefort Dome – Largest verified impact structure on Earth

== Botanical Gardens ==
- Durban Botanic Gardens – Africa's oldest surviving botanical gardens, in South Africa
- Free State National Botanical Garden – National Botanical Garden just outside Bloemfontein, South Africa
- Garden Route Botanical Garden – Botanical Garden in George, Western Cape
- Hantam National Botanical Garden – Botanical Garden just outside Nieuwoudtville in the Northern Cape, South Africa
- Harold Porter National Botanical Garden – Conservation area at Betty's Bay in the Western Cape, South Africa
- Johannesburg Botanical Garden – Botanical garden in Emmarentia, Johannesburg, South Africa
- Karoo Desert National Botanical Garden – Botanical garden focused on succulents and other plants of arid regions
- Kirstenbosch National Botanical Garden – Botanical garden at the foot of Table Mountain in Cape Town
- Kwelera National Botanical Garden – National botanical garden in the Eastern Cape
- Pietermaritzburg National Botanical Garden – Botanical garden in Pietermaritzburg, South Africa
- Lowveld National Botanical Garden – Botanical garden near Mbombela in Mpumalanga, South Africa
- Manie van der Schijff Botanical Garden – Botanical garden in Pretoria, South Africa
- North-West University Botanical Garden – Botanical Garden on the Potchefstroom Campus of the North-West University
- Pretoria National Botanical Garden – Garden in eastern Pretoria, Gauteng
- Stellenbosch University Botanical Garden – Oldest university botanical garden in South Africa
- University of KwaZulu-Natal Botanical Garden – Botanical garden in Pietermaritzburg, KwaZulu-Natal
- Walter Sisulu National Botanical Garden – Botanical reserve in Roodepoort, South Africa

== UNESCO Biosphere Reserves of South Africa ==
- Kogelberg Biosphere Reserve – Protected area in the Western Cape province of South Africa
- Cape West Coast Biosphere Reserve
- Waterberg Biosphere – Biosphere reserve in South Africa
- Kruger to Canyons Biosphere – Protected area in the northeastern part of South Africa
- Cape Winelands Biosphere Reserve – Protected area in Western Cape, South Africa
- Vhembe Biosphere Reserve
- Gouritz Cluster Biosphere Reserve – Protected area in the southern part of South Africa
- Magaliesberg Biosphere Reserve – UNESCO Biosphere Reserve in the North West and Gauteng provinces, South Africa
- Garden Route Biosphere Reserve
- Marico Biosphere Reserve

== Eastern Cape ==
=== National Parks situated in the Eastern Cape ===
- Camdeboo National Park – National park at Graaff-Reinet in the Eastern Cape, South Africa
- Addo Elephant National Park – Wildlife conservation park near Gqeberha in the Eastern Cape, South Africa, (Eastern Cape), also see Greater Addo Elephant National Park below
- Mountain Zebra National Park – National park in the Eastern Cape province of South Africa
- Tsitsikamma National Park – Protected area on the Garden Route, Western Cape and Eastern Cape, South Africa, also see Garden Route National Park below

=== Mega Parks in the making, predominantly in the Eastern Cape ===
- Garden Route National Park – Coastal national park in South Africa
  - Knysna National Lake Area – Coastal national park in South Africa (Western Cape)
  - Tsitsikamma National Park – Protected area on the Garden Route, Western Cape and Eastern Cape, South Africa (Western Cape)
  - Wilderness National Park – National park around the seaside town of Wilderness, Western Cape, South Africa
- Greater Addo Elephant National Park – Megapark in the Eastern Cape of South Africa
  - Addo Elephant National Park – Wildlife conservation park near Gqeberha in the Eastern Cape, South Africa, (Eastern Cape).
  - Woody Cape Nature Reserve, (Eastern Cape).
  - Eastern Cape Marine Protection Area, (Eastern Cape).
    - Bird Island – Maritime bay in the Eastern Cape of South Africa
    - St. Croix Island, Algoa Bay – Island in South Africa
- Baviaanskloof Mega Reserve – Protected area in Eastern Cape, South Africa
  - Baviaanskloof Reserve, (Western Cape)
  - Baviaanskloof Provincial Nature Reserve
  - Baviaanskloof Wilderness Area – Protected area in Eastern Cape, South Africa
  - Baviaanskloof Conservation Area
  - Guerna Wilderness Nature Reserve
  - Kouga Wilderness Area
  - Kouga private Nature Reserve
  - Berg Plaatz Provincial Reserve
  - Sepree River Private Nature Reserve
  - Beakosneck Private Nature Reserve
  - Berg Plaatz Provincial Nature Reserve

=== Parks Managed by Eastern Cape Parks ===
- Bridle Drift Dam Nature Reserve – Nature reserve in the Eastern Cape, South Africa
- Commando Drift Nature Reserve – Nature reserve in Eastern Cape Province, South Africa
- Dwesa Nature Reserve, also known as Dwesa-Cwebe Provincial Nature Reserve – Nature reserve in the Eastern Cape Province, South Africa
  - Dwesa-Cwebe Marine Protected Area – Coastal marine conservation area in the Eastern Cape, South Africa
- East London Coast Nature Reserve – Protected area in Eastern Cape Province, South Africa (consists of 12 smaller reserves)
  - Cape Morgan Nature Reserve – Coastal forest reserve in the Eastern Cape
  - Double Mouth Nature Reserve – Coastal forest reserve in the Eastern Cape
  - Cape Henderson Nature Reserve – Coastal forest reserve in South Africa
  - Gulu Nature Reserve – Coastal forest reserve in the Eastern Cape
  - Kwelera Nature Reserve – Coastal forest reserve in the Eastern Cape (accessed through the Kwelera National Botanical Garden)
  - Nahoon Nature Reserve – Riverine nature reserve in the Eastern Cape
  - Fort Pato Nature Reserve – Forest nature reserve in the Eastern Cape, South Africa
  - Umtiza Nature Reserve – Forest nature reserve in the Eastern Cape
- Fort Fordyce Nature Reserve – Nature reserve in Eastern Cape Province, South Africa
- Great Fish River Nature Reserve – Nature reserve in Eastern Cape Province, South Africa
- Great Kei Nature Reserve
  - Kei Mouth Reserve
  - Great Kei River Private Nature Reserve
- Hluleka Nature Reserve, also known as Hluleka Provincial Nature Reserve – Nature reserve in Eastern Cape Province, South Africa
  - Hluleka Marine Protected Area – Marine conservation area in the Eastern Cape in South Africa
- Mkhambathi Nature Reserve, also known as Mkambati – Coastal nature reserve at Lusikisiki in the Eastern Cape, South Africa
  - Pondoland Marine Protected Area – Marine conservation area in the Eastern Cape province of South Africa
- Mpofu Nature Reserve, also known as Mpofu Provincial Game Reserve – Nature reserve in the Amatole district of the Eastern Cape Province, South Africa
- Oviston Nature Reserve – Protected area in the Eastern Cape Province, South Africa
- Potters Pass Nature Reserve – Coastal reserve in the Eastern Cape
- Quenera Nature Reserve – Riverine protected area in the Eastern Cape
- Shamwari Game Reserve – Game reserve outside Gqeberha, Eastern Cape, South Africa
- Silaka Nature Reserve, also known as Silaka Provincial Wilderness Reserve – Nature reserve in Eastern Cape Province, South Africa, near Port St Johns
- Thomas Baines Nature Reserve – Nature reserve in Eastern Cape, South Africa, near Grahamstown
- Tsolwana Nature Reserve – South African protected area in Eastern Cape
- Waters Meeting Nature Reserve – Forest reserve in the Eastern Cape, South Africa

=== Natural Heritage Sites ===
- Barville Park Natural Heritage Site
- Elmhurst Natural Heritage Site
- Glendour Natural Heritage Site
- Kasouga Farm Natural Heritage Site
- Kruizemuntfontein Natural Heritage Site

=== Private and Other Parks ===
- Aberdeen Nature Reserve
- Alexandria Coast Reserve
- Amakhala Game Reserve
- Amalinda Nature Reserve
- Asanta Sana Game Reserve
- Aylesbury Nature Reserve
- Baviaankloof Wilderness Areas – Conservation area in Eastern Cape, South Africa see Baviaanskloof Mega Reserve
- Beggar's Bush Nature Reserve
- Bayeti Game Reserve
- Beakosneck Private Nature Reserve
- Coleridge Game Reserve
- Citruslandgoed Game Farm
- Christmas Rock to Gxulu River Marine Protected Area
- Cycad Nature Reserve – Nature reserve in the Eastern Cape, South Africa
- Dorn Boom Game Farm
- Doubledrift Provincial Nature Reserve
- East Cape Game Farm
- Emlanjeni Private Game Reserve
- Fort Fordyce Provincial Nature Reserve
- Great Fish River Complex Provincial Nature Reserve
  - Andries Vosloo Kudu Nature Reserve
  - Doubledrift Provincial Nature Reserve
- Ghio Wetland Nature Reserve – Wetland nature reserve in the Eastern Cape
- Groendal Wilderness Nature Reserve (Mierhoopplaat)
- Guerna Wilderness Nature Reserve see Baviaanskloof Mega Reserve
- Hoeksfontein Game Farm
- Hillside Safaris Game Farm
- Inkwenkwezi Private Game Reserve
- Inthaba Lodge Game Farm
- Jarandi Safaris Game Farm
- Karoo Safaris Game Farm
- Kingsdale Game Farm
- Koedoeskop Game Farm
- Kuzuko Private Game Reserve
- Kwandwe Private Game Reserve – Private game reserve, northeast of Grahamstown, Eastern Cape, South Africa
- Kwantu Private Game Reserve
- Lady Slipper Nature Reserve
- Lanka Safaris Game Farm
- Loerie Dam Nature Reserve
- Lottering Coast Reserve
- Luchaba Wildlife Reserve
- Mbumbazi Nature Reserve
- Mierhoopplaat Nature Reserve
- Minnawill Game Farm
- Monteaux Game Farm
- Nyara River Mouth Marine Area
- Hopewell Game Reserve
- Hunters Lodge Game Farm
- Hunts Hoek Safaris Game Farm
- Oudekraal Game Farm
- Pumba Private Game Reserve
- Rockdale Game Farm
- Rupert Game Farm
- Samara Private Game Reserve – Private game reserve near Graaff-Reinet in the Eastern Cape, South Africa
- Scotia Safaris Game Farm
- Schuilpatdop Game Farm
- Sepree River Private Nature Reserve
- Shamwari Game Reserve – Game reserve outside Gqeberha, Eastern Cape, South Africa
- Stinkhoutberg Nature Reserve
- Timbili Game Reserve
- Tregathlyn Game Farm
- Trumpetters Drift Game Farm

=== Forest Reserves ===
- Andrews State Forest
- Blue Lily's Bush Forest Reserve
- Hankey State Forest
- Hogsback State Forest
- Inyarha (Nyara) Forest Reserve
- Isidenge State Forest
- Katberg State Forest
- Kologha Forest Reserve
- Koomans Bush State Reserve
- Kruisrivier Forest Reserve
- Kubusi Indigenous State Forest
- Longmore State Forest
- Lottering Forest Reserve
- Plaatbos Forest Nature Reserve
- Robbe Hoek Forest Reserve
- Storms River Forest, part of the Tsitsikamma National Park
- Welbedacht State Forest
- Witelsbos State Forest

=== Protected Areas ===
- Buffalo Kloof Protected Environment – Protected Environment in the Eastern Cape in South Africa
- Entle Protected Environment – Protected Environment in the Eastern Cape in South Africa
- Indalo Protected Environment – Largest Protected Environment in the Eastern Cape
- Mountain Zebra Camdeboo Protected Environment

== Free State ==
=== National Parks ===
- Golden Gate Highlands National Park – National park in South Africa
  - Golden Gate Highlands National Park – National park in South Africa
  - QwaQwa National Park – National park in South Africa

=== Private and Other Parks ===
- Caledon Nature Reserve – Nature reserve in Free State, South Africa around the Welbedacht Dam.
- Erfenis Dam Nature Reserve
- Gariep Nature Reserve – Nature reserve in South Africa formerly known as Hendrik Verwoerd Dam Nature Reserve, only on the Free State side of the Gariep Dam, the park on the Eastern Cape side of the dam is called the Oviston Nature Reserve.
- Kalkfontein Nature Reserve – Nature reserve in Free State, South Africa around the Kalkfontein Dam.
- Koppies Dam Nature Reserve – Nature Reserve in the Free State, South Africa
- Laohu Valley Reserve – National reserve in South Africa
- Maria Moroka Nature Reserve
- Paul Saunders Nature Reserve
- Rolfontein Nature Reserve around the Vanderkloof Dam.
- Rustfontein Dam Nature Reserve
- Sandveld Nature Reserve – Nature reserve in South Africa around the Bloemhof Dam (Free State) side only, the park on the North West is called the Bloemhof Dam Nature Reserve.
- Seekoeivlei Nature Reserve – Wetland reserve in the Free State, South Africa
- Sneeuwberg Protected Environment near Seekoeivlei Nature Reserve
- Sterkfontein Dam Nature Reserve – Nature reserve in West State, South Africa around the Sterkfontein Dam.
- Soetdoring Nature Reserve – Nature reserve in Free State, South Africa around the Krugersdrift Dam.
- Tussen-die- Riviere Nature Reserve, also at the Gariep Dam, on the other side of the Orange River is the Oviston Nature Reserve, Eastern Cape.
- Willem Pretorius Nature Reserve around the Allemanskraal Dam.

== Gauteng ==
=== GDACE Parks ===
- Abe Bailey Nature Reserve – Protected area in Gauteng, South Africa
- Marievale Bird Sanctuary – Bird sanctuary reserve in Gauteng, South Africa
- Roodeplaat Nature Reserve
- Suikerbosrand Nature Reserve – Nature Reserve in Gauteng, South Africa
- Alice Glockner Nature Reserve – Nature reserve in South Africa

=== Protected Areas ===
- Magaliesberg Biosphere Reserve – UNESCO Biosphere Reserve in the North West and Gauteng provinces, South Africa
- Magaliesberg Protected Natural Environment – Protected Environment within the Magaliesberg Biosphere Reserve in South Africa

=== Other parks and private reserves ===
- Aloe Ridge Game Reserve – Game reserve in Gauteng, South Africa
- Andros Private Nature Reserve
- Austin Roberts Bird Sanctuary – South African bird sanctuary
- Avalon Private Nature Reserve
- Beaulieu Bird Sanctuary
- Cheetah Park Private Nature Reserve
- Daisy Private Nature Reserve
- Diepsloot Nature Reserve
- Dinokeng Game Reserve – South Africa wildlife sanctuary
- Ezemvelo Nature Reserve
- Faerie Glen Nature Reserve – Nature reserve in Pretoria, South Africa
- Gelderland Private Nature Reserve
- Groenkloof Nature Reserve – Nature reserve near Pretoria, South Africa
- Hartbeesthoek Radio Astronomy Conservation Area
- Hartebeeshoek Municipal Nature Reserve
- Johanna Jacobs Private Nature Reserve
- John Ness Private Nature Reserve
- Klapperkop Nature Reserve
- Kloofendal Nature Reserve – Nature reserve near Roodepoort, South Africa
- Klipriviersberg Nature Reserve – Largest nature reserve in Johannesburg
- Kromdraai Conservancy – Protected conservation park in South Africa
- Krugersdorp Nature Reserve – Game reserve in South Africa
- Leeuwfontein Nature Reserve
- Lone Hill Nature Reserve
- Montsetse Nature Reserve (The Cradle)
- Moreleta Kloof Nature Reserve – South African nature reserve
- Olifantsvlei Nature Reserve – Nature reserve in Johannesburg South
- Onderstepoort Nature Reserve
- Rietfontein Nature Reserve
- Rietvlei Nature Reserve – Nature reserve in Pretoria, South Africa
- Sterkwater Private Nature Reserve
- Tweefontein Private Nature Reserve
- Waldr Nature Reserve
- Wonderboom Nature Reserve – Nature Reserve in Pretoria, South Africa

Bishop Bird, Rooihuiskraal, Centuion

== KwaZulu-Natal ==
=== Ezemvelo KZN Wildlife ===
- iSimangaliso Wetland Park – South Africa's third-largest protected area, spanning 280 km of coastline previously known as Greater St Lucia Wetland Park, including
  - Cape Vidal Game Reserve,
  - False Bay Park – Ramsar wetland reserve in north Kwa-Zulu-Natal, South Africa,
  - Kosi Bay Nature Reserve,
    - Kosi Bay – Group of lakes in Maputaland, KwaZulu-Natal, South Africa (the town is not part of the park)
  - Lake Eteza Nature Reserve,
  - Lake Sibhayi – Lake in KwaZulu-Natal, South Africa,
  - Mapelane Nature Reserve,
  - Maputaland Marine Protected Area, also known as Maputaland Marine Reserve – Marine conservation area in northern kwaZulu-Natal in South Africa
  - Mfabeni,
  - Ozabeni,
  - St Lucia Game Reserve,
  - St Lucia Marine Reserve,
  - St Lucia Marine Sanctuary,
  - Sodwana Bay National Park – National park in northern KwaZulu-Natal, South Africa,
  - Tewate Wilderness Area and
  - UMkhuze Game Reserve, also known as Mkuze Game Reserve – Game reserve in Zululand, KwaZulu-Natal, South Africa.
- Chelmsford Nature Reserve, also known as Chelmsford Dam Nature Reserve – Nature reserve in KwaZulu-Natal, South Africa
- Hluhluwe–Imfolozi Park, also known as Hluhluwe-Umfolozi Game Reserve – Nature reserve in KwaZulu-Natal, South Africa
- Ithala Game Reserve, also known as Itala Game Reserve – Game reserve in KwaZulu-Natal, South Africa
- Krantzkloof Nature Reserve – Nature reserve in Kloof, KwaZulu-Natal
- Midmar Nature Reserve – Nature reserve in KwaZulu-Natal, South Africa
- Ndumo Game Reserve – South African game reserve in Maputaland
- Tembe Elephant Park – Game reserve in Maputaland, KwaZulu-Natal, South Africa
- Oribi Gorge Nature Reserve – Park in the Oribi Gorge, in KwaZulu-Natal, South Africa
- Spioenkop Dam Nature Reserve – Reserved area in South Africa
- Tembe Elephant Park – Game reserve in Maputaland, KwaZulu-Natal, South Africa
- Umtamvuna Nature Reserve – Coastal nature reserve in South Africa
- uKhahlamba-Drakensberg Park – Part of a world heritage site in KwaZulu-Natal, South Africa
  - Royal Natal National Park – National park in KwaZulu-Natal, South Africa
  - Rugged Glen Nature Reserve
  - Mlamboja Wilderness Area
  - Mfiffyela Nature Reserve
  - Cathedral Peak Nature Reserve see also Cathedral Peak (South Africa)
  - Cathedral Peak State Forest see also Cathedral Peak (South Africa)
  - Cathkin Peak Forest Reserve
  - Monk's Cowl Nature Reserve
  - Giants Castle Nature Reserve see also Giant's Castle
  - Giants Castle Game Reserve see also Giant's Castle
  - Highmoor State Forest
  - Mkhomazi Nature Reserve
  - Kamberg Nature Reserve
  - Lotheni Nature Reserve
  - Vergelegen Nature Reserve
  - Cobham Nature Reserve
  - Mzimkulu Wilderness Area
  - Garden Castle State Forest
  - Garden Castle Nature Reserve
  - Mzimkulwana Nature Reserve

=== Private and Other Parks ===
- Albert Falls Game Reserve, also known as Albert Falls Dam Nature Reserve – Game reserve in South Africa
- Aliwal Shoal Marine Protected Area – Marine conservation area at Aliwal Shoal off the coast of KwaZulu-Natal, South Africa
- Amatikuku Nature Reserve
- AmaZulu Game Reserve
- Athole Natural Reserve
- Beachwood Mangroves Natural Reserve
- Bonamanzi Game Park
- Coleford Nature Reserve – Nature reserve in South Africa
- Craigie Burn Nature Reserve, also known as Craigie Burn Dam Nature Reserve – Protected area in South Africa
- Dlinza Forest Nature Reserve – Protected area in South Africa, also see Dhlinza Forest
- eMakhosini Ophathe Heritage Park – Protected area in KwaZulu-Natal, South Africa
- Enseleni Nature Reserve
- Falaza Game Park
- Himeville Nature Reserve
- Hlatikulu Nature Reserve
- Impendle Nature Reserve
- Iphithi Nature Reserve – Nature reserve in KwaZulu-Natal, South Africa
- Iqxalingenwa Nature Reserve
- Karkloof Nature Reserve
- Makasa Nature Reserve
- Mount Currie Nature Reserve – Nature reserve in KwaZulu-Natal, South Africa
- Mtsikeni Wildlife Nature Reserve
- Ophathe Nature Reserve
- Paardeplaats Nature Reserve
- Phinda Resource Reserve
- Poccolan (Robinson's) Bush Nature Reserve
- Pongola Bush Nature Reserve
- Pongolapoort Nature Reserve – Protected area in KwaZulu-Natal, South Africa
- Qudeni Nature Reserve
- Richards Bay Game Reserve, also known as Richards Bay Nature Reserve
- Shongweni Game Reserve
- Sileza Nature Reserve
- Sodwana Game Reserve
- Springside Nature Reserve – Nature reserve in KwaZulu-Natal, South Africa
- Ubombo Mountain Nature Reserve
- Umhlanga Lagoon Nature Reserve – Nature reserve in South Africa
- Umlalazi Nature Reserve – Coastal nature reserve in north Kwa-Zulu-Natal, South Africa
- Vernon Crookes Nature Reserve
- Vryheid Mountain Provincial Nature Reserve
- Weenen Game Reserve, also known as Weenen Provincial Nature Reserve

=== Natural Heritage Sites ===
- Kombewaria
- Langfontein
- Oshoek – Border crossing between South Africa and Eswatini
- Oudehoutdraai
- Tafelkop
- Theespruit
- Rooikraal

== Limpopo ==
=== National Parks ===
- Kruger National Park – First national park in South Africa
  - Makuleke, also known as Pafuri Triangle – Northernmost section of Kruger National Park, South Africa
- Mapungubwe National Park – National park in Limpopo, South Africa
- Marakele National Park – National park in Limpopo Province, South Africa

=== Provincial Parks ===
- Lekgalameetse Provincial Park – Mountain wilderness in Limpopo, South Africa
- Letaba Ranch Provincial Park – Protected area in Limpopo, South Africa
- Mano'mbe Provincial Park
- Mokolo Dam Provincial Park – Protected area in Limpopo, South Africa
- Nwanedi Provincial Park – Nature reserve in South Africa
- Tzaneen Dam Provincial Park

=== Private and Other Parks ===
- Associated Private Nature Reserves in the Greater Kruger National Park
  - Balule Nature Reserve, also known as Bulule Private Game Reserve – Protected area in Limpopo Province, South Africa
  - Kapama Game Reserve, also known as Kapama Private Game Reserve – Game reserve in Limpopo, South Africa
  - Manyeleti Game Reserve
  - Moditlo Private Game Reserve
  - Klaserie Game Reserve, also known as Klaserie Private Game Reserve
  - Timbavati Game Reserve, also known as Timbavati Private Game Reserve – Nature reserve in South Africa
    - Motswari Game Reserve
    - Ngala Game Reserve
  - Thornybush Game Reserve, also known as Thornybush Private Game Reserve
  - Sabi Sand Game Reserve – Reserve in South Africa. See Mpumalanga, province.
  - Sabi Sabi – Private game reserve in South Africa Private Game Reserve
    - Mala Mala Game Reserve – Game reserve in Mpumalanga, South Africa
    - Djuma Game Reserve
    - Lion Sands Reserve
    - Londolozi Private Game Reserve – Private Game Reserve
    - Singita Game Reserve – South African game lodge brand
    - Ulusaba Private Game Reserve – Game reserve in South Africa
    - Exeter Private Game Reserve.
  - Umbabat Game Reserve, also known as Umbabat Private Game Reserve
- Atherstone Nature Reserve – Reserve in Limpopo province, South Africa
- Ben Alberts Nature Reserve – Protected area in Limpopo, South Africa
- Ben Lavin Nature Reserve – Protected area in Limpopo, South Africa
- Blouberg Nature Reserve – South African nature reserve
- Blyde-Olifants Conservancy – Game farm group
- D'nyala Nature Reserve – Protected area in South Africa
- Doorndraai Dam Nature Reserve – Nature reserve in Limpopo, South Africa
- Entabeni Game Reserve – Private reserve in Limpopo, South Africa
- Hanglip Reserve – Mountain in Limpopo, South Africa
- Hans Merensky Wilderness – Nature reserve in South Africa
- Kaingo Private Game Reserve
- Kololo Game Reserve – Biosphere reserve in South Africa
- Langjan Nature Reserve – Nature reserve in Limpopo, South Africa
- Lapalala Game Reserve – Conservation area in South Africa
- Luvhondo Private Nature Reserve
- Mabalingwe Game Reserve – Protected area in Limpopo, South Africa
- Mabula Game Reserve – Private game reserve in Limpopo, South Africa
- Makuleke – Northernmost section of Kruger National Park, South Africa region, Kruger NP
- Makalali Conservancy
- Makapansgat Valley – Archaeological and palaeontological site in South Africa
- Makuya Nature Reserve
- Mapesu Private Game Reserve
- Masebe Nature Reserve
- Matshakatini Nature Reserve – Military base in Limpopo, South Africa
- Modjadji Nature Reserve – Cycad nature reserve in Limpopo
- Mohlabetsi Conservancy
- Mokolo Dam Nature Reserve – Protected area in Limpopo, South Africa
- Musina Nature Reserve
- Ndzalama Reserve, also known as Ndzalama Wildlife Reserve – Limpopo province, South Africa
- Nwanedi Game Reserve – Nature reserve in South Africa
- Nylsvley Conservancy – Nature reserve in Limpopo Province, South Africa
- Percy Fyfe Conservancy
- Philip Herd Nature Reserve
- Polokwane Game Reserve
- Rust De Winter Nature Reserve – Nature reserve in South Africa
- Schuinsdraai Nature Reserve
- Selati Game Reserve – South African game reserve
- Soutpansberg Conservancy – South African protected area
- Touchstone Game Reserve – South African game reserve
- Tshukudu Private Game Reserve – Family-owned game reserve in South Africa
- Umhlametsi Game Reserve – South African game reserve
- Welgevonden Game Reserve
- Wolkberg Wilderness Area – Protected area in Limpopo, South Africa
- Wonderkop Nature Reserve

== Mpumalanga ==
=== National Parks ===
- Kruger National Park – First national park in South Africa

=== Provincial Parks ===
- Barberton Nature Reserve
- Blyde River Canyon Nature Reserve – Biosphere reserve in South Africa (mostly in Mpumalanga, small section in Limpopo)
- Loskop Dam Nature Reserve – Nature reserve in South Africa
- Mabusa Nature Reserve
- Mahushe Shongwe Reserve
- Mdala Game Reserve – Protected area in Mpumalanga, South Africa
- Mkhombo Nature Reserve – Protected area in Mpumalanga, South Africa
- Mthethomusha Game Reserve – Protected area in Mpumalanga, South Africa
- Nooitgedacht Dam Nature Reserve
- Ohrigstad Dam Nature Reserve
- Songimvelo Game Reserve – Provincial park in South Africa
- SS Skosana Nature Reserve – Protected area in South Africa
- Verloren Valei Nature Reserve – Protected area of South Africa

=== Private and Other Parks ===
- Edeni Game Reserve
- Josefsdal Songimvelo Game Reserve
- K'Shani Private Game Reserve
- Mthethomusha Game Reserve – Protected area in Mpumalanga, South Africa
- SterkSpruit Nature Reserve
- Kudu Private Nature Reserve
- Lionspruit, part of Marloth Park
- Santa Nature Reserve

== Northern Cape ==
=== National Parks ===
- Ai-Ais/Richtersveld Transfrontier Park – Transfrontier park in Namibia and South Africa
- Augrabies Falls National Park – National park in the Northern Cape, South Africa
- Kgalagadi Transfrontier Park – Transfrontier conservation area in Botswana and South Africa
- Meerkat National Park – National park in the Northern Cape, South Africa
- Mokala National Park – Protected area in the Northern Cape, South Africa
- Namaqua National Park – South African national park in Namaqualand in the Northern Cape
  - Skilpad National Park
  - Namaqualand Marine Protected Area
- Tankwa Karoo National Park – Conservation area west of Sutherland in the Western and Northern Cape

=== Private and Other Parks ===
- Archaeological Reserve
- Goegab Nature Reserve
  - Hester Malan Veldblom Reserve
- Oorlogskloof Nature Reserve – Nature reserve in South Africa
- Spitskop Nature Reserve
- Sunnyside Game Farm
- Tswalu Desert Reserve
- Thuru Lodge
- Witsand Nature Reserve – Nature reserve in the Northern Cape, South Africa

== North West ==
=== Provincial Parks ===
- Barberspan Bird Sanctuary
- Bloemhof Dam Nature Reserve
- Borakalalo Game Reserve
- Boskop Dam Nature Reserve
- Botsalano Game Reserve
- Kgaswane Mountain Reserve – Ramsar site reserve within the Magaliesberg Biosphere, North West, South Africa
- Lichtenburg Game Reserve
- Madeleine Robinson Nature Reserve
- Madikwe Game Reserve – Game reserve in South Africa
- Mafikeng Game Reserve – South African game reserve
- Marico-Bosveld Nature Reserve
- Molemane Eye Nature Reserve
- Molopo Game Reserve
- Oog van Malmanie Nature Reserve
- Pienaar Nature Reserve
- Pilanesberg National Park – Wildlife reserve in an extinct volcano in South Africa
- Rustenburg Nature Reserve
- Rust De Winter Nature Reserve – Nature reserve in South Africa
- S.A. Lombard Nature Reserve – Nature reserve in South Africa
- Schoonspruit Nature Reserve
- Vaalkop Dam Nature Reserve
- Wolwespruit Dam Reserve, also known as Wolwespruit Nature Reserve

=== Protected Areas ===
- Magaliesberg Biosphere Reserve – UNESCO Biosphere Reserve in the North West and Gauteng provinces, South Africa
- Magaliesberg Protected Natural Environment – Protected Environment within the Magaliesberg Biosphere Reserve in South Africa

=== Private and Other Parks ===
- Faan Meintjies Nature Reserve
- Magaliesberg Natural Area
- Marico Bosveld Nature Reserve
- Knysna National Lakes Nature Reserve

== Western Cape ==
=== National Parks ===
- Agulhas National Park – Park in South Africa
- Bontebok National Park – National park near Swellendam in the Western Cape, South Africa
- Garden Route National Park – Coastal national park in South Africa
  - Knysna National Lake Area – Coastal national park in South Africa
  - Tsitsikamma National Park – Protected area on the Garden Route, Western Cape and Eastern Cape, South Africa
  - Wilderness National Park – National park around the seaside town of Wilderness, Western Cape, South Africa
- Karoo National Park – Wildlife reserve in the Western Cape, South Africa
- Table Mountain National Park – Nature conservation area on the Cape Peninsula in Cape Town, South Africa
- West Coast National Park – Nature reserve north of Cape Town in the Western Cape province of South Africa

=== Provincial Parks ===
==== West Coast ====
- Cederberg Wilderness Area – Mountain range in Western Cape, South Africa
- Bird Island Nature Reserve – Protected area in Lambert's Bay, South Africa
- Rocherpan Nature Reserve – Nature reserve in Western Cape, South Africa
- Groot Winterhoek Wilderness Area – Protected area in the Western Cape region of South Africa

==== Winelands ====
- Limietberg Nature Reserve
- Jonkershoek Nature Reserve – Nature reserve in the Western Cape of South Africa
  - Assegaaibosch Nature Reserve – Historic estate in the Western Cape, South Africa
- Hottentots Holland Nature Reserve – Conservation area in the Hottentots Holland Mountains
- Vrolijkheid Nature Reserve

==== Overberg ====
- Marloth Nature Reserve – Nature reserve in South Africa
- Kogelberg Nature Reserve – Protected area in the Western Cape province of South Africa
- Walker Bay Nature Reserve – Coastal nature reserve in the Western Cape province of South Africa
- Salmonsdam Nature Reserve – Nature reserve in the Overberg region of the Western Cape in South Africa
- De Mond Nature Reserve – Nature reserve in Western Cape, South Africa
- De Hoop Nature Reserve – Nature reserve in the Western Cape, South Africa
- Grootvadersbosch Nature Reserve – South African nature reserve
- Boosmansbos Wilderness Area – Wilderness area in the Western Cape, South Africa

==== Cape Karoo ====
- Anysberg Nature Reserve – Nature reserve in the Western Cape, South Africa
- Swartberg Nature Reserve – Protected area in the Western Cape province of South Africa
- Gamkaberg Nature Reserve – Nature reserve in the Western Cape, South Africa

==== Garden Route and Little Karoo ====
- Outeniqua Nature Reserve
- Goukamma Nature Reserve
- Keurbooms River Nature Reserve
- Robberg Nature Reserve – Conservation area at Plettenberg Bay, South Africa
- Pledge Nature Reserve – Nature reserve in Knysna, South Africa

=== Private and other Reserves ===
- Akkeren Dam Nature Reserve
- Anrewsfield Private Nature Reserve
- Annet Private Nature Reserve
- Annex Arch Rock Private Nature Reserve
- Aquila Private Game Reserve
- Assegaaibosch Nature Reserve – Historic estate in the Western Cape, South Africa
- Babilonstoring Nature Reserve
- Banghoek Private Nature Reserve
- Basjanskloof Private Nature Reserve
- Baviaanskloof Nature Reserve – Protected area in Eastern Cape, South Africa for the rest see Eastern Cape.
- Ben Etive Nature Reserve
- Blouberg Nature Reserve – South African nature reserve
- Boosmansbos Nature Reserve
- Caledon Nature Reserve – Nature reserve in Free State, South Africa
- Ceres Mountain Fynbos Nature Reserve
- Dassieshoek Nature Reserve
- Doringriver Nature Reserve
- Drie Kuilen Private Nature Reserve
- Duiwenhoksriviermond Private Nature Reserve
- Dyer Island Nature Reserve Complex – Protected islets off the coast of Gansbaai, South Africa
- Elim Private Nature Reserve
- Eyerpoort Private Nature Reserve
- Fonteintjiesberg Nature Reserve
- Gamtoos River Mouth Nature Reserve
- Gondwana Game Reserve – Game reserve in the Western Cape, South Africa
- Goukamma Nature Reserve
- Gouriqua Kernkor Private Nature Reserve
- Greyton Nature Reserve
- Groenlandberg Nature Reserve
- Groote Kapelfontein Private Nature Reserve
- Groot Swartberg Nature Reserve
- Hasekraal Private Nature Reserve
- Hoek-van-die-Berg Private Nature Reserve
- Hottentots-Holland Nature Reserve – Mountain range in the Western Cape, South Africa
- Inverdoorn Private Nature Reserve
- Kaplip Private Nature Reserve
- Kareedouw Nature Reserve
- Keurboomsrivier Nature Reserve
- Kleinmond Coastal and Mountain Nature Reserve
- Klipfontein Dam Private Nature Reserve
- Koeberg Nature Reserve – Nature reserve surrounding Koeberg Nuclear Power Station, South Africa
- Hexberg Nature Reserve
- Hopefield Private Nature Reserve
- Houwhoek Nature Reserve, including the Lebenon State Forest
- Ladismith Klein Karoo Nature Reserve
- Lourens River Protected Natural Environment – Area along the Lourens River in Helderberg, South Africa
- Lutzville Nature Reserve
- Maanschynkop Nature Reserve
- Marloth Nature Reserve – Nature reserve in South Africa
- Matjiesfontein Nature Reserve
- Matroosberg Private Nature Reserve
- Moedverloren Nature Reserve
- Montagu Mountain Nature Reserve
- Mount Rochelle Nature Reserve
- Paarl Mountain Nature Reserve
- Quoin Point Nature Reserve
- Riverland Nature Reserve
- Riviersonderend Nature Reserve
- Robberg Nature Reserve – Conservation area at Plettenberg Bay, South Africa
- Rooiberg Nature Reserve
- Rooikrans Private Nature Reserve
- Ruiterbos Nature Reserve
- Salmonsdam Nature Reserve – Nature reserve in the Overberg region of the Western Cape in South Africa
- Sas Saldanha Nature Reserve
- Skuilkrans Private Nature Reserve
- Steenbokkie Private Nature Reserve
- Susterdal Private Nature Reserve
- Swartberg East Nature Reserve
- Swartkops Valley Nature Reserve
- Theewaters Nature Reserve
- Towerkop Nature Reserve
- Thaba Manzi Game Farm
- Twistniet Nature Reserve
- Tygerberg Nature Reserve – Nature reserve in Cape Town, South Africa
- Uintjieskraal Private Nature Reserve
- Vaalkloof Private Nature Reserve
- Vrolijkheid Nature Reserve
- Warmwaterberg Nature Reserve
- Witfontein Nature Reserve
- Wittebrug Nature Reserve, also known as Mostertshoek Forest
- Witzenberg Nature Reserve

=== Forests ===
- Bergplaas Forest
- Diepwalle Forest
- Fisantehoek Forest (Petrus Brand)
- Jubilee Creek Forest Reserve (Goldfield)
- Groeneweidebos Forest Area
- Hankey State Forest
- Harkerville Forest
- Lelievlei Forest Reserve
- Millwood Forest Reserve
- Knysna Forest – Ecoregion in South Africa
- Quar Forest Reserve
- Sinclair Forest (Kruisfontein)
- Walker Bay State Forest
- Wilderness Forest
- Witelsbos State Forest

=== Natural Heritage Sites ===
- Altydgedacht National Heritage Site
- Barkai National Heritage Site
- Elandsberg
- Groothagelkraal
- Gys se Kraal
- Kareedouw – Town in the Eastern Cape, South Africa
- Paardenberg-Bewarea
- Tierberg – Mountain in Switzerland

=== Mountain Catchment Areas ===
- Hawequas Mountain Catchment Area
- Kammanassie Mountain Catchment Area
- Klein Swartberg – Mountain range in Western Cape, South Africa Mountain Catchment Area
- Koue Bokkeveld – Mountain range in Western Cape, South Africa Mountain Catchment Area
- Langeberg East Mountain Catchment Area
- Langeberg West Mountain Catchment Area
- Matroosberg – Second tallest mountain in the Western Cape, South Africa Mountain Catchment Area
- Swartberg – Mountain range in Western Cape, South Africa East Mountain Catchment Area
- Winterhoek – Mountain range in the Western Cape region of South Africa Mountain Catchment Area

== See also ==
- List of national parks
- List of seaweeds of South Africa (disambiguation)
- South African National Parks – Body responsible for managing South Africa's national parks
- Ezemvelo KZN Wildlife – South African wildlife conservation organisation
- Eastern Cape Parks – Body responsible for Parks in the Eastern Cape, South Africa
- South African Heritage Resources Agency – Heritage agency of South Africa
- List of heritage sites in South Africa
