= Moditlo Private Game Reserve =

Moditlo Private Game Reserve (3 500 hectares, approximately 7 500 acres) forms an integral part of the 10 000 hectare Blue Canyon Private Game Reserve, located near Hoedspruit, Limpopo Province, South Africa. The reserve borders Kapama Game Reserve to the eastern side, the Drakensberg Mountains forms the backdrop to the west, and falls into the southern/central region of the Greater Kruger Park biosphere. The size of the Blue Canyon Conservancy has now reached 36,000 acres in total, and is home to typical African game such as lions, elephants, leopards, rhinos, cheetahs, hippos and several hundreds of bird species typical to the lowveld in South Africa. The reserve is also home to a pack of wild dogs, which is the second rarest carnivore species in Africa with only an estimated 2000 remaining specimen in existence.

== Wildlife ==
- African bush elephant
- south-central black rhinoceros
- southern white rhinoceros
- South African giraffe
- Impala
- Wildebeest
- Kudu
- Lion
- African wild dog
- African leopard
- southeast African cheetah
- Spotted hyena
- Brown Hyena
- Southern ground-hornbill

== Accommodation ==
- Moditlo River Lodge
- Vuyani Safari Lodge

== See also ==
- Protected areas of South Africa
