= Ghio Wetland Nature Reserve =

Wetland nature reserve in the Eastern Cape

- Interactive map of Ghio Wetland Nature Reserve
- Location: Eastern Cape, South Africa
- Nearest city: Kenton-on-Sea
- Coordinates: 33°37′57″S 26°34′26″E
- Area: 54.35 ha (134.3 acres)
- Established: 22 February 1985

Ghio Wetland Nature Reserve is a wetland nature reserve that lies near the Boesmans River, south of the Indalo Protected Environment, near Kenton-on-Sea.

== History ==
This 54.35 ha (134.3 acres) reserve was established in 1985.

== See also ==
- List of protected areas of South Africa
