= Oxyopes bonneti =

Bonnet's Lynx Spider

Conservation status
- Least Concern (SANBI Red List)

Scientific classification
- Kingdom: Animalia
- Phylum: Arthropoda
- Subphylum: Chelicerata
- Class: Arachnida
- Order: Araneae
- Infraorder: Araneomorphae
- Family: Oxyopidae
- Genus: Oxyopes
- Species: O. bonneti

Binomial name
- Oxyopes bonneti Lessert, 1933

Species of spider

Oxyopes bonneti is a species of spider in the family Oxyopidae. It is commonly known as Bonnet's lynx spider.

== Distribution ==
Oxyopes bonneti occurs in Angola and South Africa. In South Africa, the species has been recorded from Limpopo Province at altitudes ranging from 859 to 1,168 m above sea level.

== Habitat and ecology ==
The species is commonly found on grasses and has also been collected using pitfall traps in the Savanna biome. It appears to be well-adapted to the savanna environment of the northern regions.

== Description ==
Oxyopes bonneti is known only from males. The species exhibits typical lynx spider characteristics including long, slender legs with prominent spines and the characteristic tapering opisthosoma found in the genus Oxyopes.

== Conservation ==
Oxyopes bonneti is listed as Least Concern by the South African National Biodiversity Institute. Despite being known from only one locality in Angola, the large distance between collection areas suggests the species may be under-collected. It is protected in Blouberg Nature Reserve, Ben Lavin Nature Reserve, and Kruger National Park.
