= Mohlabetsi Conservancy =

- Location: South Africa
- Nearest city: Hoedspruit

Mohlabetsi Conservancy, borders the Klaserie Game Reserve, which in its turn borders the Kruger Park, close to Hoedspruit, in the Limpopo province, South Africa. It has a safari lodge.

== See also ==
- Protected areas of South Africa
