= AmaZulu Game Reserve =

AmaZulu Game Reserve, is located in the KwaZulu-Natal, province of South Africa and has an area of about 10.000 hectares.

== Wildlife ==
Wildlife species include the Big five game, southeast African cheetah, South African giraffe, warthog and hyena, as well as 15 different antelope species, hippopotamus and Nile crocodile.

== Accommodation ==
- AmaKhosi Safari Lodge.

== See also ==
- Protected areas of South Africa
