= Prince Edward Islands Marine Protected Area =

Indian Ocean region in South Africa's EEZ

Prince Edward Island Marine Protected Area
- Prince Edward Island MPA location
- Location: Prince Edward Islands, South Africa
- Coordinates: 46°43.5′S 37°53.5′E
- Area: 181,229.46 km^{2} (69,973.09 sq mi)
- Established: 2013

The Prince Edward Island Marine Protected Area is an offshore conservation region near the Prince Edward Islands in the exclusive economic zone of South Africa, nearly 2,000 km southeast of South Africa in the Indian Ocean. The MPA provides habitat for seals, killer whales, breeding seabirds and Patagonian toothfish.

== History ==
The Prince Edward Islands have been managed as a special nature reserve since November 1995, but there was originally no marine component. The Minister of Environmental Affairs and Tourism (DEAT), Martinus van Schalkwyk, announced South Africa's intention to declare a large MPA around the sub-Antarctic Prince Edward Islands in June 2004. This was followed by consultation between DEAT and WWF to guide the implementation of this MPA. The result was a compromise between conservation and commercial fishing interests based on the available information. The Minister of Water and Environmental Affairs Bomo Edith Edna Molewa, declared a Marine Protected Area in the waters surrounding the Prince Edward Islands by Government Notice 426 in Government Gazette 36575, dated 21 June 2013.

== Purpose ==
A marine protected area is defined by the IUCN as "A clearly defined geographical space, recognised, dedicated and managed, through legal or other effective means, to achieve the long-term conservation of nature with associated ecosystem services and cultural values".

The Prince Edward Islands MPA is intended to stop the decline of the Patagonian toothfish, which has been critically over-exploited, and to reduce the seabird bycatch of the fishery, particularly of albatrosses and petrels.

== Extent ==
The MPA protects 181,229.46 km^{2} (69,973.09 sq mi) of sea in the EEZ around the Prince Edward Islands.

=== Boundaries ===
The Prince Edward Islands MPA is the area of sea enclosed by a polygon of borders lines sequentially joining the points from S43°34′, E34°56′, straight to S44°10′, E35°35′, straight to S45°06′, E36°36′, straight to S46°06′, E37°42′, straight to S46°06′, E38°44′, straight to S44°50′, E42°27′, along the boundary of the EEZ to S45°46′, E°42′53, along the boundary of the EEZ to S48°42′, E43°02′, straight to S46°42′, E41°48′, straight to S47°57′, E38°07′, straight to S49°20′, E38°36′, straight to S50°14′, E35°36′, along the boundary of the EEZ to S49°16′, E34°03′, straight to S48°02′, E35°25′, straight to S47°03′, E36°31′, straight to S46°12′, E35°36′, straight to S45°16′, E34°35′, straight to S44°30′, E33°44′ and back along the boundary of the EEZ to S43°34′, E34°56′.

=== Zonation ===
The MPA comprises a sanctuary zone, four restricted zones, and a controlled zone, linking the restricted zones.

==== Sanctuary area ====
The sanctuary zone extends 12 nautical miles offshore from the high water mark. It is inside the Prince Edward Islands restricted zone.

==== Restricted areas ====
Southwest Indian Ridge restricted area:

- North-eastern border: S44°10′, E35°35′ to S45°06′, E36°36′
- South-eastern border: S45°06′, E36°36′ to S46°12′, E35°36′
- South-western border: S46°12′, E35°36′ to S45°16′, E34°35′
- North-western border: S45°16′, E34°35′ to S44°10′, E35°35′

Prince Edward Islands restricted area:

- Northern border: S46°06′, E37°03′ to S46°06′, E38°44′
- Eastern border: S46°06′, E38°44′ to S47°21′, E38°44′
- Southern border: S47°21′, E38°44′ to S47°21′, E37°03′
- Western border: S47°21′, E37°03′ to S46°06′, E37°03′

Africana II Rise restricted area:

- Northern border: S45°46′, E41°48′ to S45°46′, E42°53′
- Eastern border: S45°46′, E42°53′ to S48°42′, E43°02′ along the border of the EEZ
- Southern border: S48°42′, E43°02′ to S47°57′, E38°07′
- Western border: S47°57′, E38°07′ to S45°46′, E41°48′

Abyss restricted area:

- North-eastern border: S48°02′, E35°25′ to S49°20′, E38°36′
- South-eastern border: S49°20′, E38°36′ to S50°14′, E35°36′
- South-western border: S50°14′, E35°36′ to S49°16′, E34°03′ along the border of the EEZ
- North-western border: S49°16′, E34°03′ to S48°02′, E35°25′

==== Controlled areas ====
The controlled zone is remainder of the MPA outside of the restricted areas.

== Management ==
The marine protected areas of South Africa are the responsibility of the national government, which has management agreements with a variety of MPA management authorities, which manage the MPAs with funding from the SA Government through the Department of Environmental Affairs (DEA).

The Department of Agriculture, Forestry and Fisheries is responsible for issuing permits, quotas and law enforcement.

== Use ==
The MPA is allegedly home to 40% of the world's albatrosses.

== Ecology ==
=== Marine species diversity ===
==== Animals ====
Marine mammals:

- Southern elephant seal - breeding colony
- Sub-Antarctic fur seal - breeding colony
- Antarctic fur seal - breeding colony

Marine birds:

- King penguin - breeding colony
- Gentoo penguin - breeding colony
- Macaroni penguin - breeding colony
- Southern rockhopper penguin - breeding colony
- Wandering albatross - breeding colony
- Grey headed albatross - breeding colony
- Indian yellow-nosed albatross - breeding colony
- Dark-mantled sooty albatross - breeding colony
- Light-mantled sooty albatross - breeding colony

Fish:

- Patagonian toothfish

== Threats ==
Marine resources of the MPA have been threatened by illegal, unregulated and unreported fishing for Patagonian toothfish Dissostichus eleginoides. Longline fishing also has an impact on seabirds which get snagged while lines are being set.

== Slipways and harbors in the MPA ==
There are no slipways or harbors in or near the MPA.

== See also ==
Marine protected areas of South Africa

- List of protected areas of South Africa
- Marine protected areas of South Africa – Protected areas of coastline or ocean in the EEZ of South Africa
