= Polokwane Game Reserve =

- Location within Limpopo Location within South Africa
- Location: Limpopo, South Africa
- Nearest city: Polokwane
- Coordinates: 23°58′S 29°28′E
- Established: 1977

Polokwane Game Reserve, formerly Pietersburg Nature Reserve, is situated near Polokwane in the Limpopo province of South Africa. It is 2800 ha in size, making it one of the largest municipal game reserves in South Africa. The reserve entrance is near its northern limit, about 1 km south of the N1 freeway. It is accessed via Silicon Street and an entrance fee is charged.

== Habitat ==
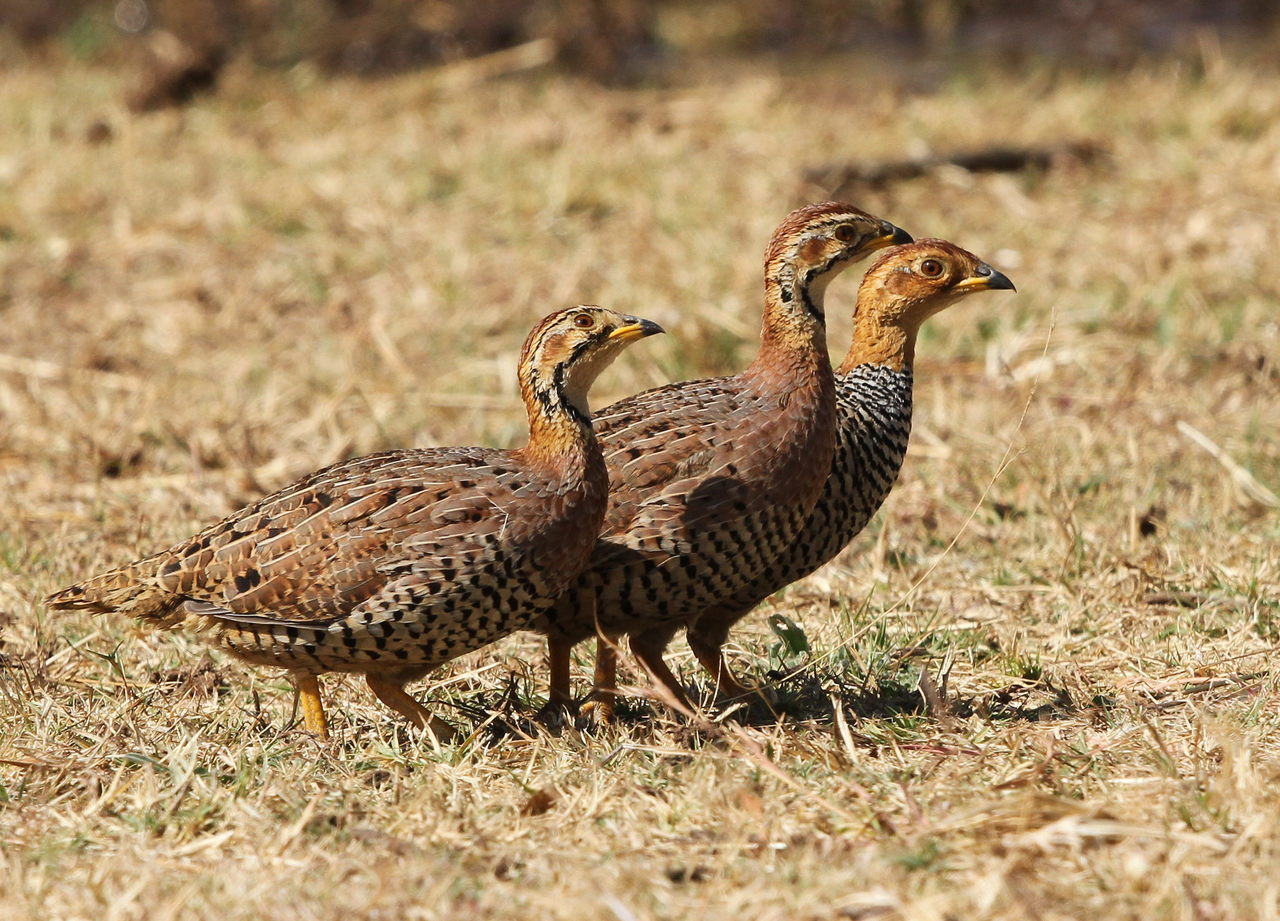
A covey of coqui francolin in the reserve

The reserve is intersected by a small tributary of the Sand River, which is dammed at various points to provide water for its game animals. A ridge in its eastern section is densely vegetated with Aloe marlothii, a pretty sight when they flower in winter. The remainder of the reserve consists of grassy plains, dotted with clumps of bush, which includes Acacia and Searsia species.

== Animals ==
As of 2025, some 1000 marabou storks were roosting in the reserve.

== See also ==
- Protected areas of South Africa
