= Doorndraai Dam Nature Reserve =

Nature reserve in Limpopo, South Africa

- Interactive map of Doorndraai Dam Nature Reserve
- Location: Limpopo, South Africa
- Nearest city: Potgietersrus
- Coordinates: 24°18′20″S 28°45′20″E
- Area: 70 km^{2} (27 sq mi)

Doorndraai Dam Nature Reserve, is situated south west of Potgietersrus, in the Limpopo, province of South Africa, it has an area of about 7,000 ha. It encloses the Doorndraai Dam reservoir.

== Wildlife ==
Fauna in the reserve includes waterbuck, kudu, bush buck, mountain reedbuck, blue wildebeest, zebra, giraffe and warthog. Less common sightings include leopard, Southern African wildcat, aardvark and hedgehog.

== See also ==
- Protected areas of South Africa
- Limpopo Tourism and Parks Board
