= Manyeleti Game Reserve =

- Interactive map of Manyeleti Game Reserve
- Type: Game reserve
- Location: Mpumalanga , South Africa
- Nearest city: Hoedspruit
- Coordinates: 24°37.316′S 31°27.3′E
- Area: 22,750 hectares (56,200 acres)
- Created: 1967
- Operator: Mpumalanga Provincial Government
- Open: All year
- Website: www.manyeleti.com/index.php

The Manyeleti Game Reserve is situated in the east of the Mpumalanga province of South Africa. The game reserve is managed by the Mpumalanga Provincial Government and is over 22,750 ha in area.

== Location ==
Manyeleti lies directly adjacent to the Kruger National Park (without fences), with the Sabi Sand Game Reserve to its south and the Timbavati Game Reserve to its northwest. In Xitsonga, 'Manyeleti' means "Place of Stars". During the night, the skyline of Manyeleti is dominated by billions of bright stars, hence the name.

== Political history ==
During the Apartheid years, the central government designated Manyeleti as a game reserve for exclusive use by the Bantu's of the country, hoping that this arrangement would satisfy black South Africans' aspirations to a Game Reserve of their own. Five hunting ranches were purchased by the Department of Bantu Affairs and opened in 1967.

The Tsonga people, who occupied the land before colonization, were given visiting rights to this area. Currently the Tsonga tribe under the leadership of the Mnisi and Mathebula tribes are in a process of reclaiming the land from which they were forcibly removed.

== See also ==
- Protected areas of South Africa
