= Umhlametsi Game Reserve =

South African game reserve

The Umhlametsi Game Reserve is a game reserve located next to Kruger National Park, in the Limpopo province of South Africa.

Umhlametsi is a Big Five game reserve.

== See also ==
- Protected areas of South Africa
