= Weenen Game Reserve =

- Location within KwaZulu-Natal
- Location: KwaZulu-Natal, South Africa
- Nearest city: Pietermaritzburg, South Africa
- Coordinates: 28°50′06″S 29°59′47″E
- Area: 5,009 ha (19.34 sq mi)
- Established: 1975
- Governing body: Ezemvelo KZN Wildlife

This 5,000-ha protected area is administered by Ezemvelo KZN Wildlife and covers an area of typical inland KwaZulu-Natal acacia savanna with occasional thickets. The reserve offers extensive game-viewing facilities, guided walks, environmental education, and three picnic sites.

== History ==
Before 1948 the land was used as a labour tenant farm with subsistence crop and livestock farming. Inappropriate practices resulted in severe soil erosion, and in 1948 the farm was expropriated by the Department of Agriculture. This department successfully implemented extensive soil and wetland reclamation measures, including the construction of retaining walls, gabions, rock packs and brush packs and the restriction of grazing. In 1975 the area was proclaimed a nature reserve.

== Vegetation ==
Vegetation types include Dry Tall Grassveld, Mixed Thornveld and Valley Bushveld. The Dry Tall Grassveld is generally sparse, dominated by Hyparrhenia hirta and encroached by woody species. Vachellia karroo, Vachellia nilotica, Euclea crispa, Euclea racemosa, Olea europaea, Ozoroa paniculosa, Premna mooiensis and Vitex rehmannii are found in the Mixed Thornveld.

Rangelands are managed through the strategic use of fire and the control of herbivore numbers; blue wildebeest, impala and warthog were intentionally excluded when the reserve was stocked because their grazing habits can cause soil erosion.

== Fauna ==
Weenen Game Reserve supports mammals such as black rhinoceros, giraffe, kudu, eland, white rhinoceros, red hartebeest, and zebra; impala and warthog (originally from neighbouring properties) have established populations in the reserve. Other mammal species include hyaena, jackal, bushbuck, reedbuck, steenbok and porcupine. More than 230 species of birds have been recorded.

== Facilities ==
The game reserve has a small two-bedroom cottage with barbeque facilities and its own trail and waterhole. There are 12 caravan and camping sites, three picnic sites and two hides at waterholes. A guided walk of 8 km can be taken.
