= Greater Addo Elephant National Park =

Megapark in the Eastern Cape of South Africa

The Greater Addo Elephant National Park is a megapark in the making, and consists of the following parks:

- Addo Elephant National Park
- Woody Cape Nature Reserve
- Marine Protection Area
  - Bird Island
  - St Croix Island

== Objectives ==
The park is intended to guarantee long term conservation of the regional biodiversity and to reduce threats to the biodiversity by effective and efficient management, and to promote a sustainable and inclusive eco-tourism industry in the region.

== Funding ==
The Global Environment Facility (GEF) funded a research process to determine the ideal choice of land for inclusion in the park. The land classes in the proposed area were identified in a conservation planning framework, and ecological processes. potential threats and vulnerability of each land class was considered, along with conservation targets for fauna populations.

== Extent ==
The park extends between Woody Cape across the Colchester area, the original elephant enclosure, the Nythani concession area, large parts of the Zuurberg mountain range to the Darlington Dam area and Kuzuko contractual area to the R400 road between Jansenville and Paterson.The final extent of the park is expected to cover about 240 000 hectares of land and 120 000 hectares of marine protected area. A long term goal is to consolidate the terrestrial part of the park by linking up sections with corridors to help manage the park in a state as close to natural as practicable.

== Biomes ==
The expanded park includes parts of five of South Africa's nine biomes. These are Albany thickets, fynbos, forest, Nama Karoo and the Indian Ocean coastal belt.

== Biodiversity ==
The park extends protection of the traditional big five game, the southern right whale and great white shark.
