= Makalali Conservancy =

Makalali Conservancy, also known as the Greater Makalali Private Game Reserve, is situated west of Phalaborwa, and north of Hoedspruit, in the Limpopo province, South Africa, and has an area of about 24,500 Ha. Makalali means ‘place of rest’ in the Shangaan language.

In the 1990s, elephants were reintroduced to the reserve. By the 2000s, the number of elephants had grown so significantly, the reserve began a contraception program to limit their numbers. Other animals have been introduced to the reserve, including cheetahs in coordination with the Endangered Wildlife Trust.

On the grounds of the reserve, the Siyafunda Research Camp was opened in 2004 to support the reserve with elephant monitoring for their contraception program. Volunteers travel to the reserve to stay at the camp and to conduct research on the wild animal population. In 2015, a Swiss volunteer staying at the camp was killed by a leopard while sleeping outdoors.

== See also ==
- Protected areas of South Africa
