= Magaliesberg Protected Natural Environment =

Protected Environment within the Magaliesberg Biosphere Reserve in South Africa

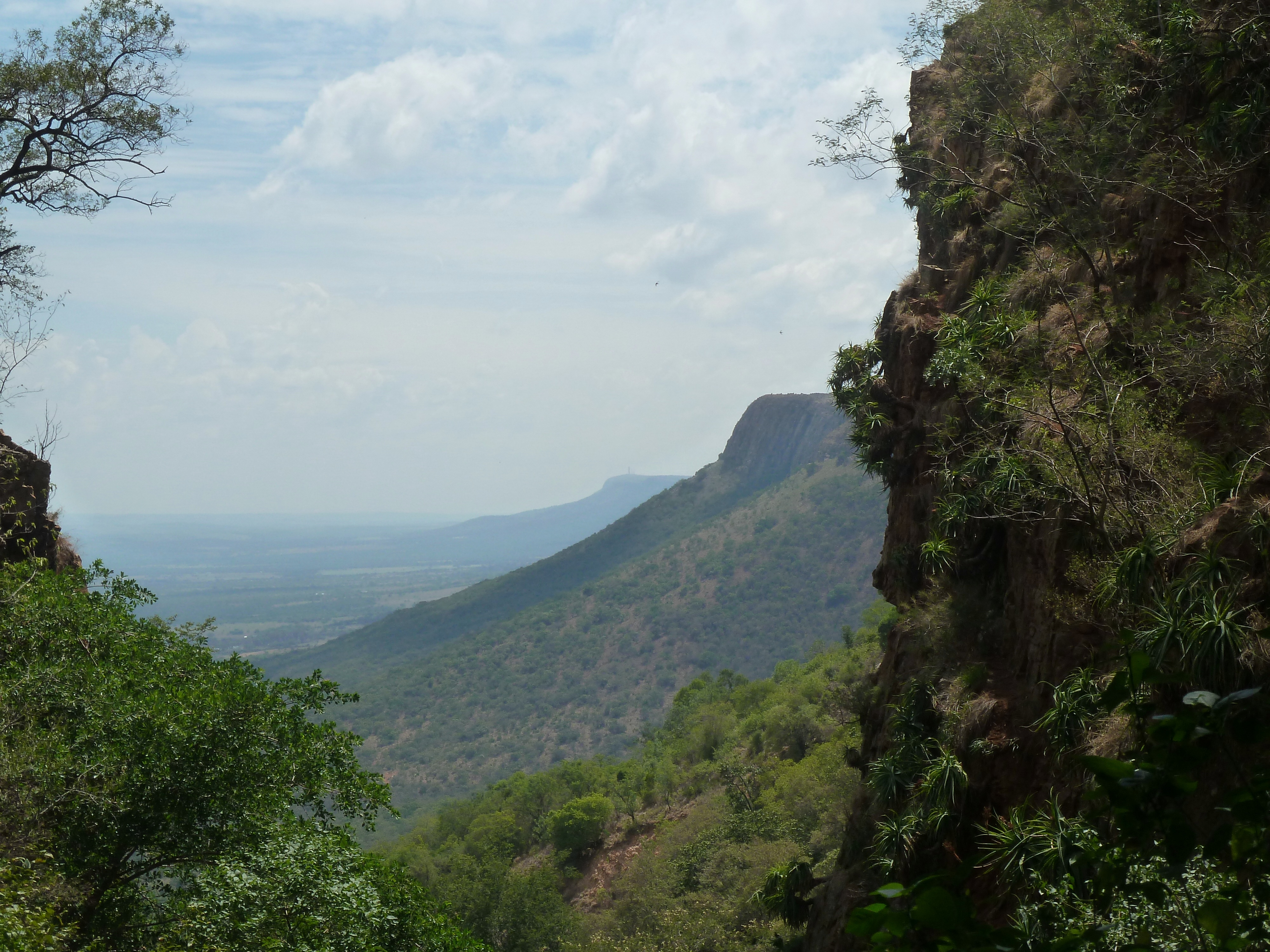
- Magaliesberg Biosphere Reserve Magaliesberg Protected Natural Environment
- Location: From Rustenburg to Pretoria
- Nearest city: Rustenburg
- Coordinates: 25.808°S 27.594°E
- Area: 343.56 km^{2} (132.65 sq mi)
- Established: 4 May 1994
- Governing body: North West Department of Agriculture, Environment and Rural Affairs
- Magaliesberg Protected Natural Environment (North West (South African province)) Magaliesberg Protected Natural Environment (South Africa)

Overview of the environment

The Magaliesberg Protected Natural Environment is one of two core zones found within the Magaliesberg Biosphere Reserve along the Magaliesberg mountain range in South Africa, from Rusternberg to Pretoria.

The Kgaswane Mountain Reserve Ramsar site is situated on its upper edges. The Hartbeespoort Dam Nature Reserve cuts across near its eastern side, with the Wonderboom Nature Reserve situated at the eastern edge.

== History ==
The process to protect the area began in the 1960s. In 1977, it was declared a Natural Area. In 2009, the total current area of 343.56 km^{2} (132.65 sq mi) was declared a Protected Environment. The entirety of the Magaliesberg Protected Natural Environment, excluding Kgaswane Mountain Reserve, is privately owned.

== See also ==
- List of protected areas of South Africa
