= Mabalingwe Nature Reserve =

Protected area in Limpopo, South Africa

Mabalingwe Reserve
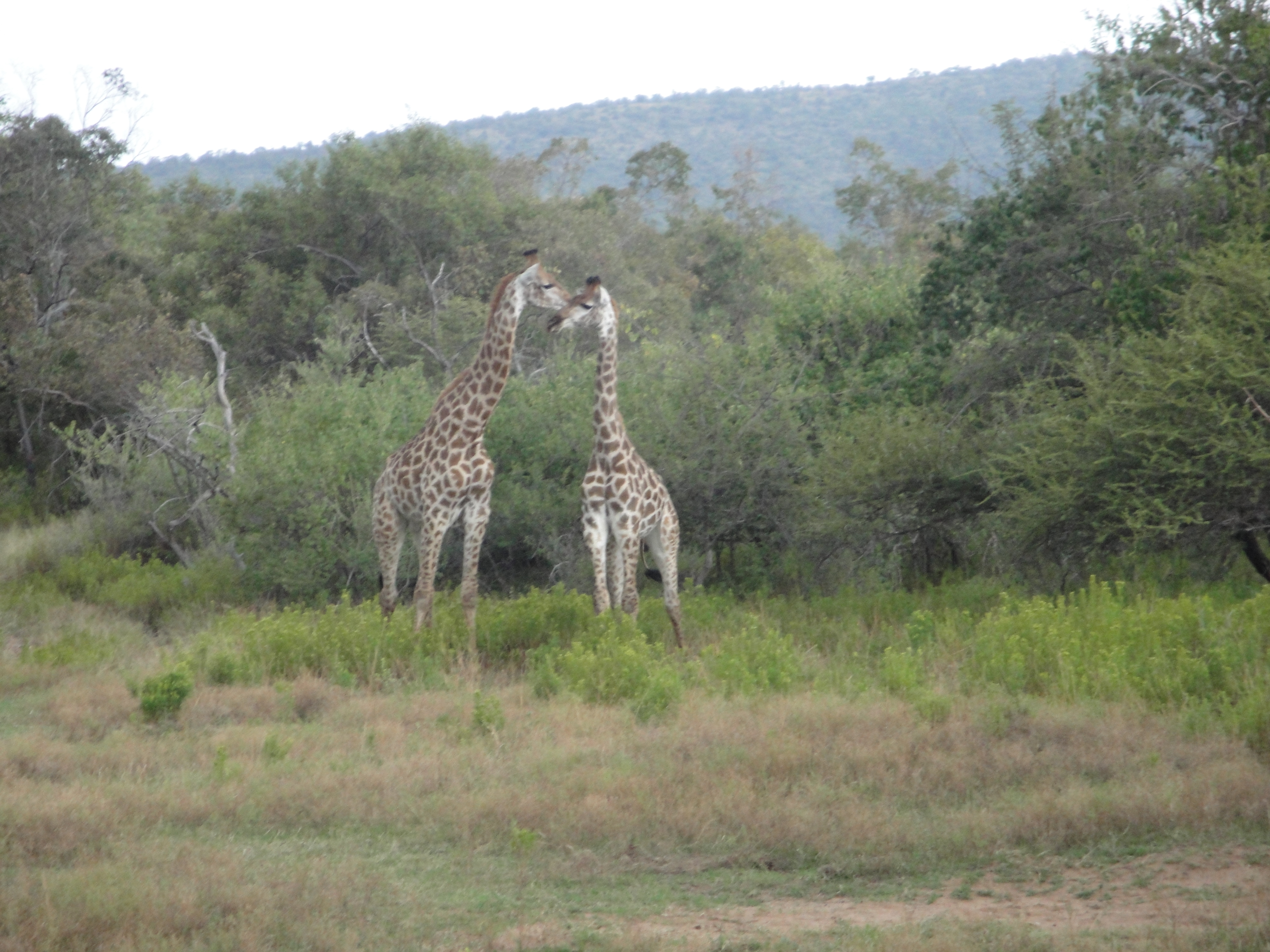

- Location within North West (South African province) Location within South Africa
- Location: Limpopo, South Africa
- Nearest city: Bela Bela
- Coordinates: 24°50′0″S 28°2′53″E
- Area: 8 800 ha
- Established: 1989

Mabalingwe , is located 28 km west of Bela Bela, in the Limpopo province of South Africa, and is about 8 800 hectare in area. It is in an easily accessible, malaria-free area of the Transvaal bushveld, around an hour-and-a-half drive from Johannesburg.

Mabalingwe means "Spots of the leopard." The name comes from the phrase "mabala ya ingwe" - mabala means "spot" in Tswana and ingwe is Zulu for "leopard."

== History ==
Mabalingwe was originally a maize and cattle farm of 2,141 hectares, named Boschpoort, which was founded by the Wessels family in 1972. Originally, the only animals on the farm were kudu and impala.

In 1987, Basie Wessels developed Boschpoort into a vacation resort. The first 10 chalets were finished in 1988. In 1989, hippopotami, southern white rhinoceros, black rhinoceros, and sable were brought in.

By 1994, there were around 105 units set up. Parts of the farm were sold to sole proprietors to build houses. The farm was also enlarged then by the purchase of the neighboring Gorcum farm.

In 1994, Basie's son Hannes, an architect by profession, returned to the farm to develop the caravan park and later the other sectional title schemes on MAbalingwe. That year, Olievenfontein was purchased and added to the development. Elephant, earmarked to be culled in Kruger National Park, were rescued and resettled in Mabalingwe in 1996. In 1999, disease-free African buffalo began being bred in Hoedspruit, Limpopo, after which some of those buffalo were settled in Mabalingwe.

The Itaga lodge opened in 2000, and two new lodges, namely Boekenhoutplaat and Elandsfontein, were added as well. In 2003, Cyferfontein was developed. By this time, Mabalingwe had grown to around 8,800 hectares.

In 2003 Mabalingwe Country Club, now known as Zubula, was developed by Dale Hayes, Steve Dunn, Hannes Wessels and Dr Dirk Snyman. This briefly expanded the reserve to 12 500 hectares. However Zebula later became a separate entity, leaving the Mabalingwe Reserve with 8 800 hectares.

Basie Wessels, Mabalingwe's original owner and developer, died in April 2008 in a tragic autogyro crash.

In 2024 the Ingilozi development was introduced to the Mabalingwe Reserve as another sectional title scheme, expanding the reserve to 9200 hectares.

Since 2003 Mabalingwe continued to grow, new companies were established, and there are more stakeholders involved than ever before. Mabalingwe is referred to 'The Greater Mabalingwe' by private owners and home owners as the reserve is composed of various entities including private farms, ten sectional title schemes, a shareblock scheme registered as 'Mabalingwe Nature Reserve Shareblock (Pty) Ltd, other companies including Mabalingwe Game Reserve (Pty) Ltd owned by the Wessels family, and regulatory bodies such as the Mabalingwe Common Property Association and Ludum Game Consortium (Pty) Ltd.

== Wildlife ==
Wildlife include the big five game: lion, leopard, buffalo, elephant and rhinoceros, but also hippo, giraffe, hyena, warthog and impala to name but a few of the 36 species of mammals. For bird lovers there are more than 220 species of birds to be spotted.

There are popular game drives in open 4x4 vehicles, conference facilities, restaurants, pubs, and swimming pools.

== Lodgings ==
The reserve includes several types of timeshare accommodation in thatched chalets, including some close to the main complex and others deeper in the reserve for privacy and serenity.

The main complex includes 34 thatched chalets, each with its own bathroom. The accommodation on the rest of the reserve is divided into four camps:

- Ingwe (Leopard camp) is near the main complex
- Kubu (including Hippo Creek)
- Phiri (Hyena camp) furthest into the forest
- Kwalata (Sable camp)
- plus a number of whole ownership lodges

== Facilities ==
Mabalingwe includes the following facilities:

- Caravan park
- Several hot tubs and swimming pools
- Tennis and squash courts
- Miniature golf course
- Farm shop
- Restaurant and ladies bar overlooking the dams
- Safari launch points
- Self catering units

== See also ==
- Protected areas of South Africa
