= Touchstone Game Reserve =

South African game reserve

Touchstone Game Reserve is a privately owned 100,000 Hectare game farm that is situated in the north-western section of the Waterberg Biosphere Reserve in the Limpopo province of South Africa.

== Wildlife ==
The wildlife hosted by the reserve include the "big five game":

- Lion
- African leopard
- African bush elephant
- Rhinoceros (southern white rhinoceros and south-central black rhinoceros)
- Cape buffalo

== See also ==
- Protected areas of South Africa
