= Tshukudu Private Game Reserve =

Family-owned game reserve in South Africa

Coordinates: 24°16′28″S 30°55′28″E

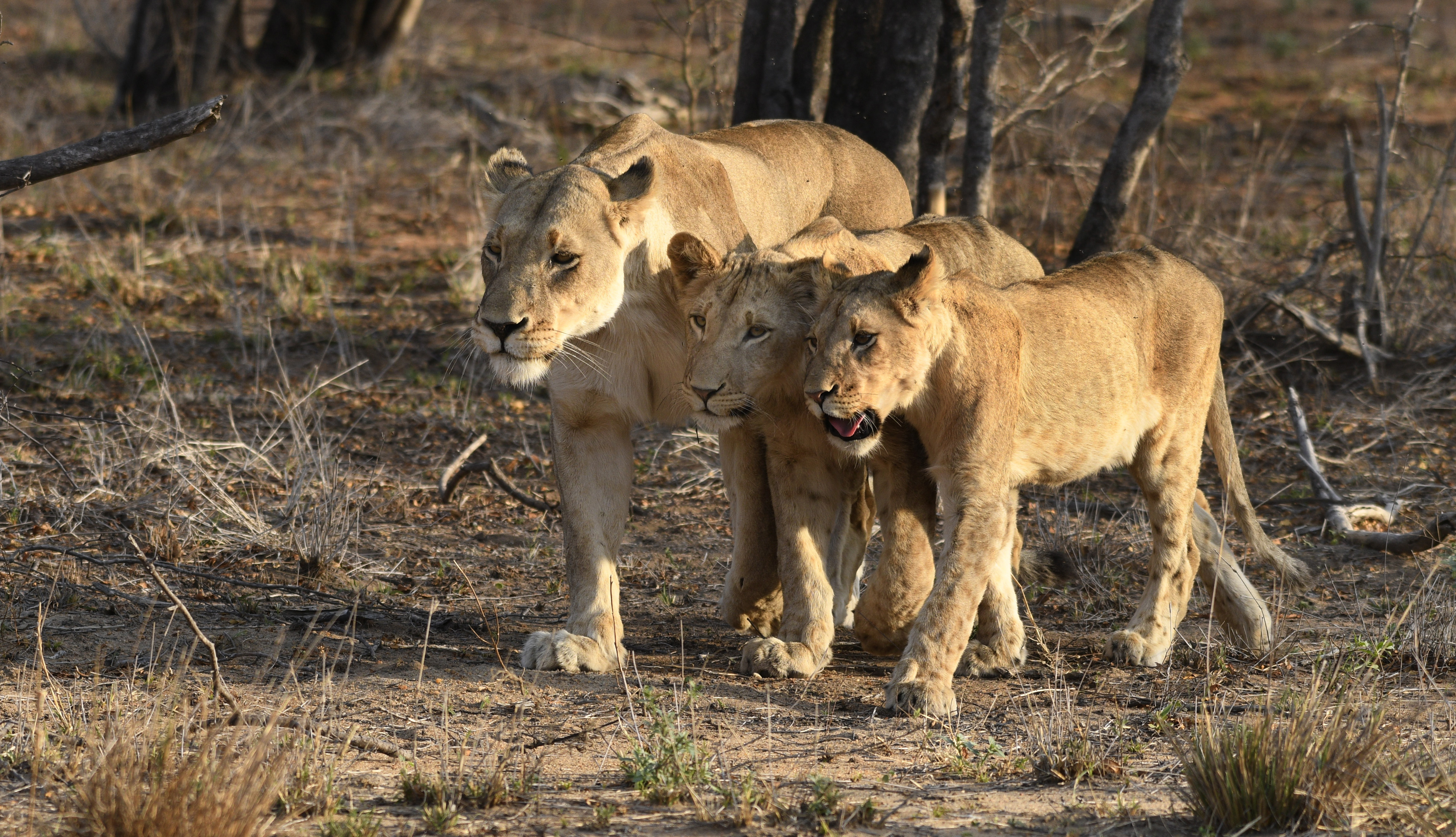
Lioness with cubs in the reserve

Tshukudu Private Game Reserve is situated next to Kruger National Park near Hoedspruit in Limpopo province, South Africa. The name "Tshukudu" means "rhino" in Sotho. Tshukudu has been a family owned reserve since 1980.

Rhinoceros in the game reserve are dehorned to prevent poaching.

== Wildlife ==
Wildlife species include: lion, leopard, South African cheetah, African bush elephant, southern white rhino, common eland, waterbuck, kudu, bushbuck, wildebeest, Burchell's zebra, South African giraffe, warthog, impala, steenbuck, duiker, porcupine, jackal, hyena, caracal, serval, civet, genet, Southern African wildcat, hippo, and Nile crocodile.

== See also ==
- Protected areas of South Africa
