= Dlinza Forest =

Subtropical forest in KwaZulu-Natal, South Africa

Coordinates: 28.905253°S 31.444759°E

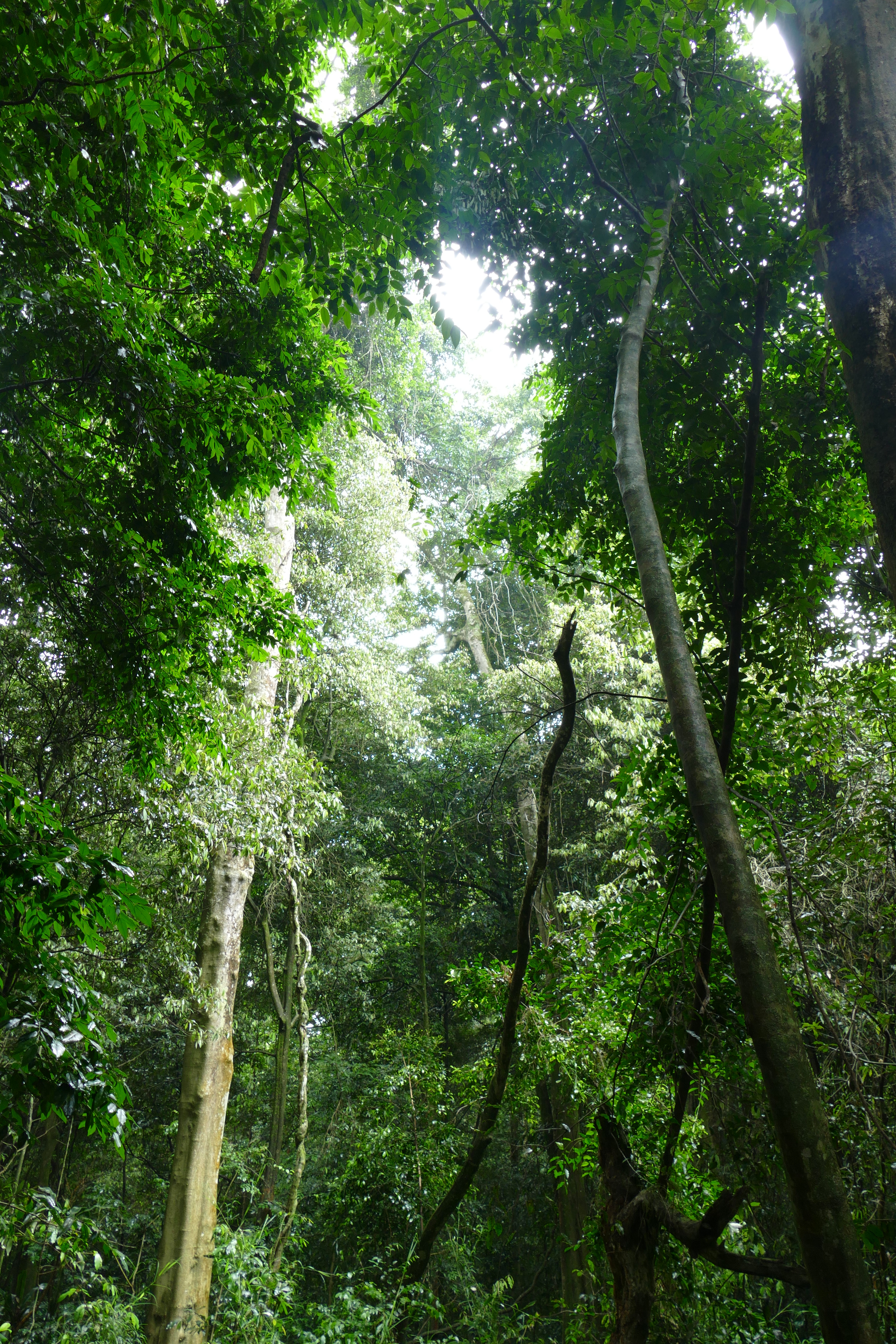
Inside Dhlinza Forest.

The Dlinza Forest is a subtropical forest or Coastal Scarp Forest in Eshowe, Zululand, South Africa, one of five natural forests running in a 100 km line running northwest from the coast. Others are the Ongoye, Entumeni, Nkandla and Qudeni Forests. They are the most important forests in southern Africa from the aspect of unique biodiversity. It contains rare birds, chameleons, snails, butterflies, moths, frogs and beetles. Dlinza is the home of more than 65 species of birds, including the endangered spotted ground thrush which breeds here, rare Delegorgue's pigeon, magnificent purple-crested turaco and Narina trogon.

The name Dlinza is derived from Zulu meaning a gravelike place of meditation. Occasional church services are held there and every three years a nativity play, written by Selwyn Moberley in 1953, is staged in the forest.

== Canopy Boardwalk ==
First of its kind in Southern Africa, the boardwalk winds through the forest canopy and ends up on a tower overlooking the Dlinza Forest. The Boardwalk takes you 125 metres through the forest understory to a 20 metre high viewing platform which emerges above the canopy of trees.

== See also ==
- Dlinza Forest Nature Reserve
- Forests of KwaZulu-Natal
