= Hans Merensky Wilderness =

Nature reserve in South Africa

- Location of the Reserve in Limpopo Province
- Location: Limpopo, South Africa
- Nearest city: Tzaneen
- Coordinates: 23°41′45.03″S 30°40′17.41″E
- Area: 5 268 ha
- Established: 8 September 1954; 71 years ago
- Hans Merensky Wilderness (Limpopo) Hans Merensky Wilderness (South Africa)

Hans Merensky Wilderness, also known as the Hans Merensky Nature Reserve, is a protected area in Limpopo Province, South Africa. It has an area of about 5,268 ha and lies in the Lowveld between Kruger Park and the town of Tzaneen. It is located within the UNESCO Kruger to Canyons Biosphere on the banks of the Great Letaba River, a tributary of the Olifants River.

The Reserve is named after Hans Merensky, a South African geologist and conservationist. There is an ethnographic museum, the Tsonga Kraal Museum, displaying the culture of the Tsonga people.

== Wildlife ==
Wildlife in the area includes Selous' zebra, blue wildebeest, warthog and South African giraffe, as well as the more elusive nocturnal animals like African leopard, black-backed jackal and spotted hyena.

== See also ==
- Protected areas of South Africa
