= Langjan Nature Reserve =

Nature reserve in Limpopo, South Africa

- Location within Limpopo Location within South Africa
- Location: Limpopo, South Africa
- Nearest city: Alldays
- Coordinates: 22°50′30″S 29°14′32″E
- Area: 4,774 ha (11,800 acres)
- Governing body: Limpopo Provincial Government

Langjan Nature Reserve, is situated in Limpopo province, South Africa, on the R521 to Alldays, west of Makhado, close to the Blouberg Nature Reserve

This 4,774-hectare (18.43 sq mi) reserve was established in 1954 to preserve the last autochthonous population of Oryx gazella. It is located between 22° 47'S and 22° 52'S and 29° 11'E and 29° 17'E and straddles the Brak River running approximately from south to north. The altitude is around 800 metres (2,600 ft) above sea level and is situated on conglomerate, limestone and sandstone and deep red Kalahari sand.

The vegetation is referred to as "arid sweet Bushveld"

== Endemic species ==
Some of the important fauna found in the reserve include:

- Oryx gazella - gemsbok
- Psammobates oculifer - serrated tortoise,
- Typhlosaurus lineatus subtaeniatus - Striped blind legless skink,
- Scelotes limpopoensis albiventris - Limpopo burrowing skink,
- Colopus wahlbergii wahlbergii - Wahlberg's Kalahari gecko

== See also ==
- Protected areas of South Africa
