= Ben Alberts Nature Reserve =

Protected area in Limpopo, South Africa

Coordinates: 24°38′13″S 27°21′29″E

Ben Alberts Nature Reserve is located in the Waterberg region of the Limpopo province of South Africa, close to the town of Thabazimbi, and just north of the Marakele National Park. The park has been closed for all visitors for a few years, and although small for a nature reserve, at only 2.000 Ha, it is well-stocked with game.

== Wildlife ==
Include: white rhino, kudu, blue wildebeest, giraffe, eland, zebra and warthog.

== See also ==
- Protected areas of South Africa
