= Olifantsvlei Nature Reserve =

Nature reserve in Johannesburg South

- Location: Johannesburg South
- Nearest city: Johannesburg
- Coordinates: 26°19′11″S 27°55′03″E
- Area: 2,043.27 hectares (5,049.0 acres)
- Created: 1957
- Operator: City of Johannesburg Metropolitan Municipality
- Olifantsvlei Nature Reserve (South Africa) Olifantsvlei Nature Reserve (Gauteng)

The Olifantsvlei Nature Reserve is a large section of protected land in Johannesburg South. It was designated in 1957 in an area of 2,043.27 hectares (5,049.0 acres). A wetland, part of the Klip River, runs along its southern border. The reserve lies adjacent to Lenasia, alongside the R554. The Golden Highway (R553) and N1 roads vertically divide it into three parts. On its northern border, it lies beneath the towns of Eldorado Park, Nancefield, Devland and Naturena (from west to east). It contains the Olifantsvlei Cemetery, Johannesburg Water's Olifantsvlei Wastewater Treatment Works and Bushkoppies Wastewater Treatment Works. Nearby is the Klipriviersberg Nature Reserve.

== Biodiversity ==
The marshland, mainly consisting of Phragmites reed beds host a number of species:

=== Birds ===
- Common reed warbler
- Baillon's crake
- Black crake
- Common moorhen
- Flufftail
- Great reed warbler
- Lesser swamp warbler
- Little bittern
- Little grebe
- Little rush warbler
- Rallidae
- Sedge warbler
- Spotted crake
- Western swamphen

=== Mammals ===
- Water mongoose

== See also ==
- List of protected areas of South Africa
