= Albert Falls Game Reserve =

Game reserve in South Africa

- Location within KwaZulu-Natal
- Location: KwaZulu-Natal, South Africa
- Nearest city: Pietermaritzburg
- Coordinates: 29°26′24″S 30°25′38″E
- Area: 30.12 km^{2} (11.63 sq mi)
- Established: 1975
- Operator: Msinsi Holdings (Pty) Ltd

Albert Falls (Dam) Nature Reserve, is a protected nature area located in the KwaZulu-Natal province of South Africa, near Pietermaritzburg and Cramond. The nature reserve was established in 1975. The Albert Falls Dam is rated as one of the best bass fishing dams in the world. The area surrounding the falls have an abundance of secluded nature trails and picnic spots. The emblem of the Albert Falls Amble is the African fish eagle, as its unique call can be heard throughout the area.

== Wildlife ==
Wildlife in the reserve include zebra, impala, blesbok, reedbuck, grey duiker, springbok, red hartebeest and oribi. The birdlife of Albert Falls Nature Reserve is profuse.

== See also ==
- Protected areas of South Africa
