= Mabuasehube Game Reserve =

Park in Botswana

- Interactive map of Mabuasehube Game Reserve
- Location: Botswana
- Coordinates: 25.12°S 22.00°E

Mabuasehube Game Reserve is a park in Botswana. In 1992 it was incorporated into Botswana's Gemsbok National Park, and in 2000 it became part of the Kgalagadi Transfrontier Park.
