= Moreleta Kloof Nature Reserve =

South African nature reserve

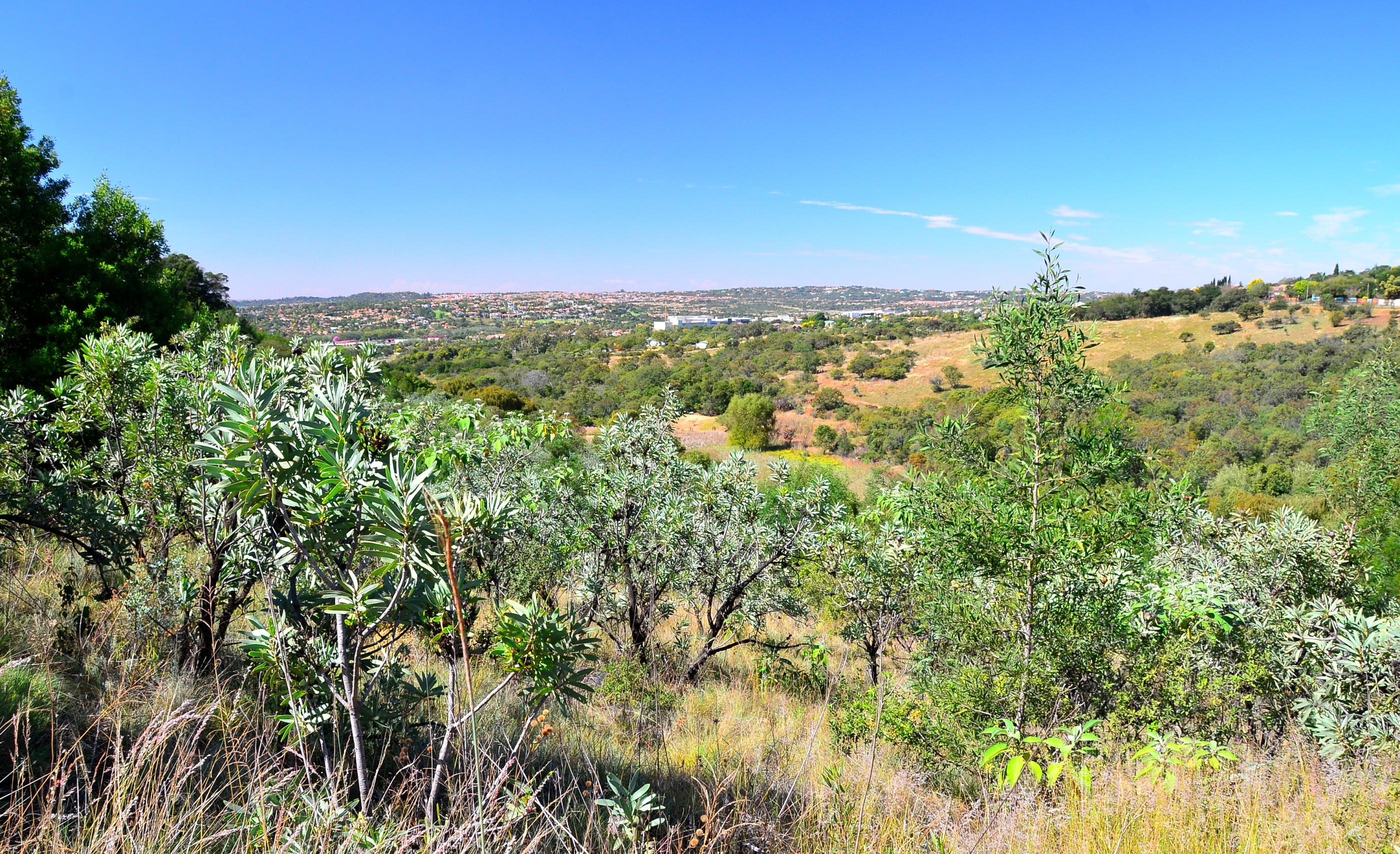
Moreleta Kloof Nature Reserve, Pretoria, South Africa

The Moreleta Kloof Nature Reserve in eastern Pretoria, Gauteng, South Africa, was part of the farm Garsfontein which was acquired by Jacobus Cornelius Rademeyer in 1859. He had married Cornelia Jacoba Susanna Erasmus on 2 Jul 1837 in George, Eastern Cape. Cornelia Erasmus was a daughter of Daniel Jacobus Elardus Erasmus, who was the first settler on the farm Zwartkop, and sister of Daniel Elardus Erasmus who had settled on the farm Doornkloof. Jacobus Rademeyer operated Garsfontein as a dairy farm and Carel Erasmus (his brother-in-law) purchased the farm from him in 1877 and built a house there; the house was later converted into a chapel which is still in use. In 1903, his son-in-law, Johan Marnewick, built another house on the farm; this house has been converted into a restaurant named Rademeyer's. The reserve is managed by the City of Tshwane Metropolitan Municipality and admission is free. The reserve covers 100 hectares.

== Animal life ==
Many species of birds have been seen here, as well as mammals such as springbok, blesbok, impala, and zebras.

== Facilities and activities ==
The reserve has several hiking trails, a restaurant, and a gazebo for weddings.

Hiking trails:

- Rademeyer Trail: 1.6 km
- Duiker Trail: 2.9 km
- Suikerbos Trail: 3.3 km
- Sensory trail for the disabled

== Hours ==
- Summer (September – April): 07:00 – 16:00 (gates closed at 17:00)
- Winter (Nat – August): 07:00 – 17:00 This might change later.
