= Craigie Burn Nature Reserve =

Protected area in South Africa

- Location within South Africa
- Interactive map of Craigie Burn Nature Reserve
- Location: KwaZulu-Natal, South Africa
- Nearest city: Ulundi
- Coordinates: 29°10′37″S 30°18′08″E
- Area: 3.32 km^{2} (1.28 sq mi)
- Established: 1078

Craigie Burn Nature Reserve, also known as Craigie Burn Dam Nature Reserve, is located on the road between Mooi River and Greytown, in the KwaZulu-Natal, province of South Africa.
