= De Mond Nature Reserve =

Nature reserve in Western Cape, South Africa

Coordinates: 34°43′S 20°7′E

Designations

Ramsar Wetland
- Official name: De Mond
- Designated: 2 October 1986
- Reference no.: 342

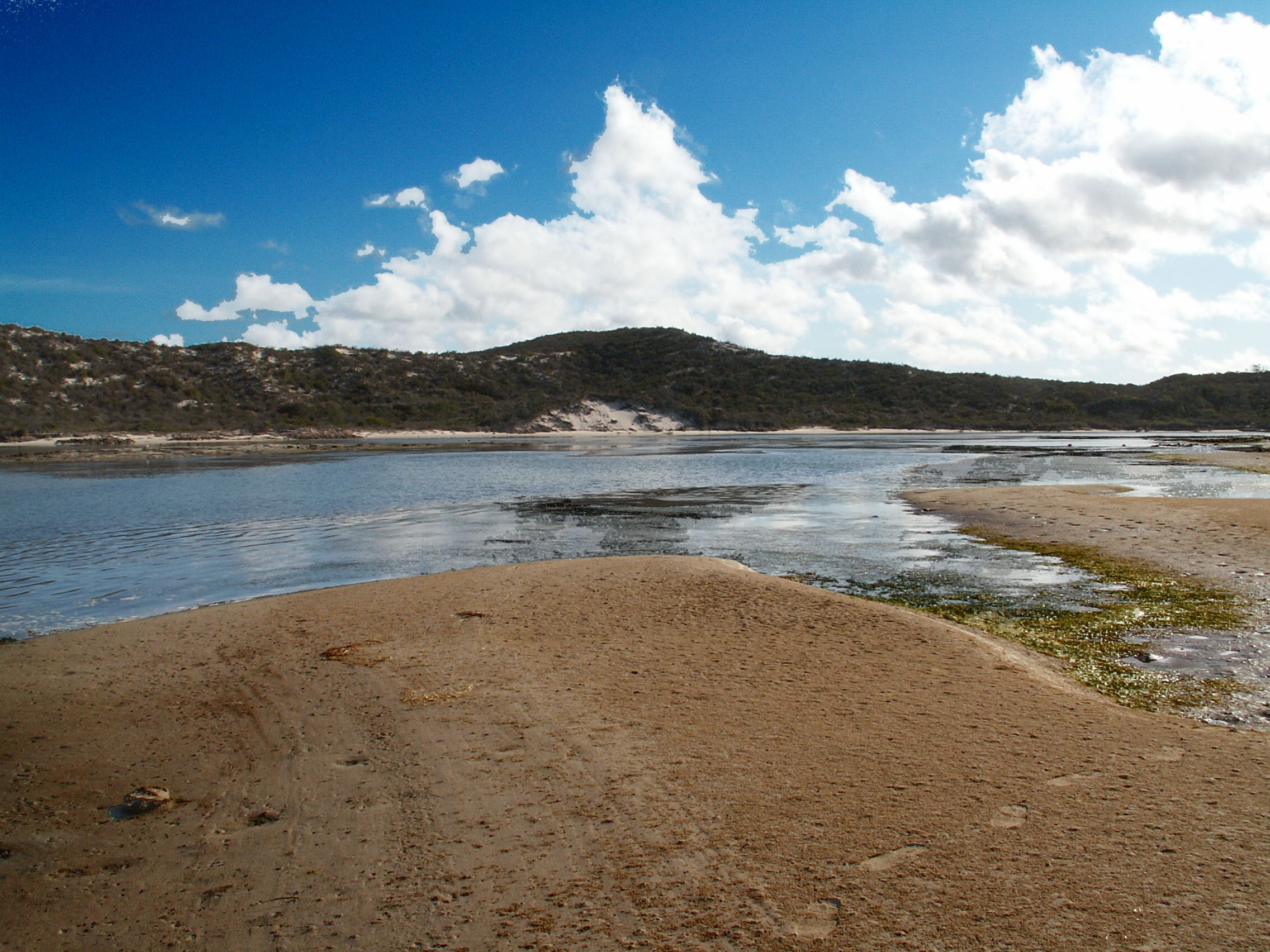
De Mond in 2005.

The De Mond Nature Reserve, in the Overberg between Struisbaai and Arniston, Western Cape, South Africa, has been a Ramsar site wetland since 1986.

The reserve covers the mouth of the Heuningnes River and covers 918 ha (2,270 acres). Shifting dunes block the river's mouth and serve as a breeding ground for various species of birds. The area is also a habitat for reptiles, crustaceans, and seahorses.

It is composed of different coastal vegetation communities, including dune milkwood forests and salt marshes making up the estuarine environment.
