= Ben Lavin Nature Reserve =

Protected area in Limpopo, South Africa

Manavhela Ben Lavin Nature Reserve
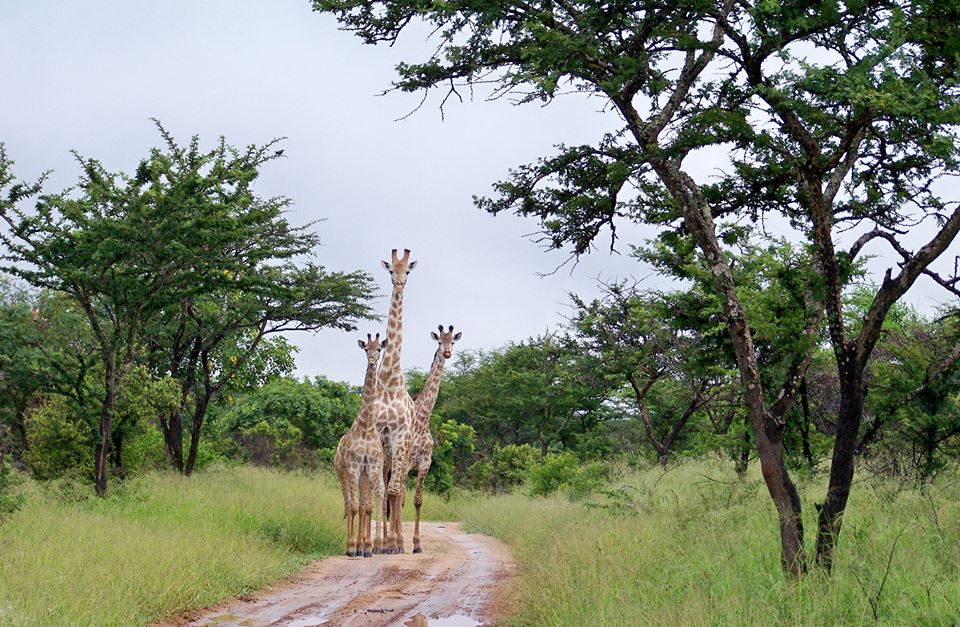
- A family of South African giraffes

- Location within Limpopo
- Location: Limpopo, South Africa
- Nearest city: Louis Trichardt
- Coordinates: 23.141903°S 29.980910°E
- Area: 25 sq km
- Established: 1976

Manavhela Ben Lavin Nature Reserve is a nature reserve located close to Louis Trichardt, in the Limpopo province of South Africa. The Reserve is about 25 square kilometres (2,500 ha) in area. It is managed by the Wildlife Society of Southern Africa.

== Archaeological value ==
The Reserve is of archaeological interest, and contains a series of ruins that date back to 1250 AD.

== See also ==
- Protected areas of South Africa
