= Kapama Game Reserve =

Game reserve in Limpopo, South Africa

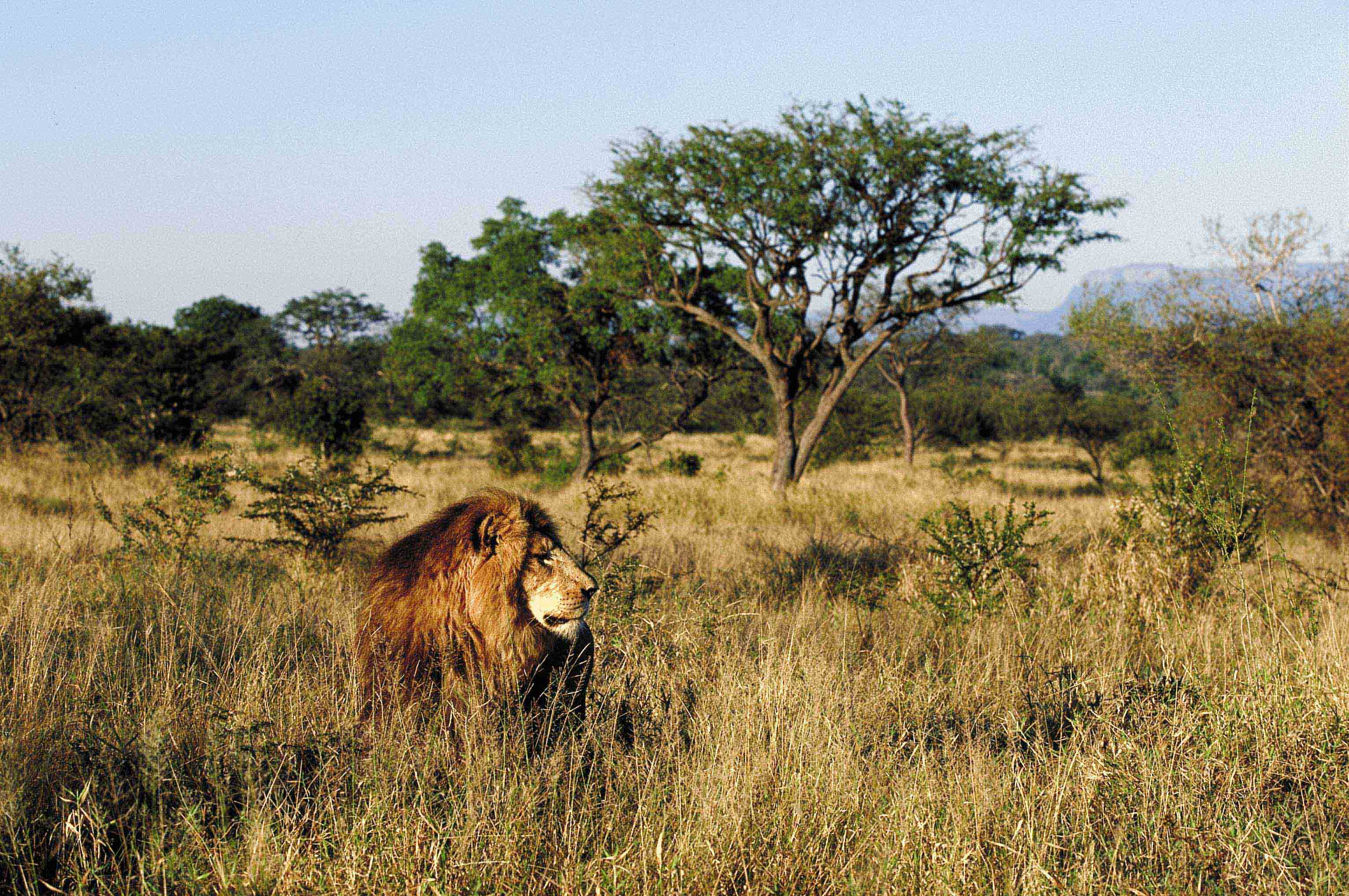
- A male lion in Kapama Game Reserve

- Location within Limpopo Location within South Africa
- Location: Limpopo, South Africa
- Nearest town: Hoedspruit
- Coordinates: 24.42639°S 31.05361°E
- Area: 13,000 ha (50 sq mi)
- Established: 1993

Kapama Game Reserve (founded 1993) is a 13,000 hectare privately owned nature reserve in the Limpopo province of South Africa. It was founded by Johann Roode, who initially bought the land for cattle grazing but realized that the local ecosystem needed to be maintained. He soon started to develop the area as a touristic region and the reserve still belong nowadays to the Roode family, who also manages part of the reserve as a rehabilitation center for injured game.

== Wildlife ==
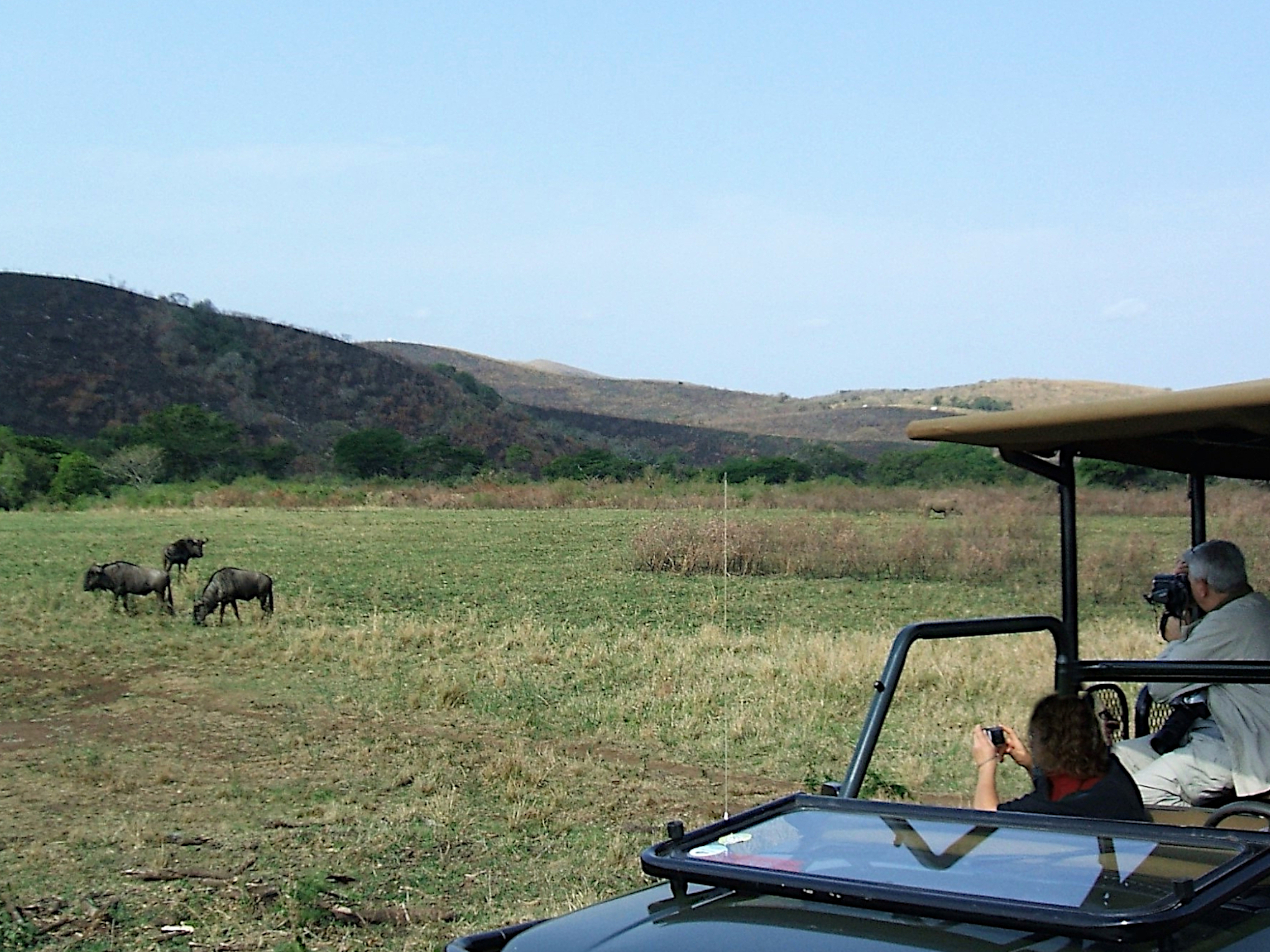
Photographing Syncerus caffer.

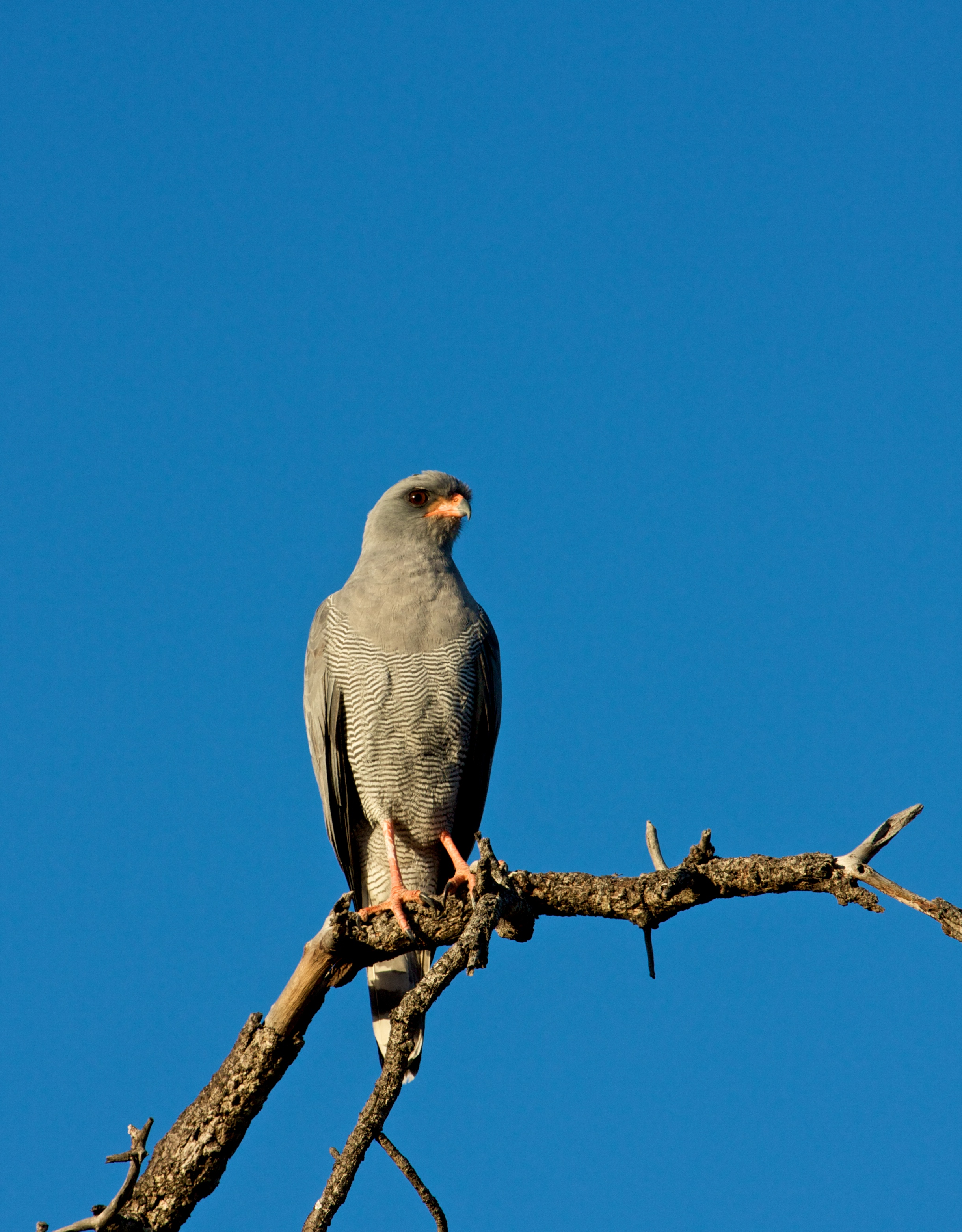
Dark chanting goshawk

Fauna include:

- African bush elephant
- African buffalo
- Southern white rhinoceros
- Hippopotamus
- South African giraffe
- Impala
- Blue wildebeest
- Greater kudu
- Lion
- Leopard
- Cheetah (including the King cheetah)
- Spotted hyena
- African wild dog (AKA Cape Hunting Dog / Painted Dog)

== See also ==
- Protected areas of South Africa
- Kapama Private Game Reserve: http://www.kapama.com/about/
- Kapama Wildreservat:
