= SS Skosana Nature Reserve =

Protected area in South Africa

- Location: Mpumalanga; South Africa
- Nearest city: Bronkhorstspruit
- Area: 1,800 hectares (18 km^{2})

SS Skosana Nature Reserve is a protected area in Mpumalanga, South Africa.
