= Dlinza Forest Nature Reserve =

Protected area in South Africa

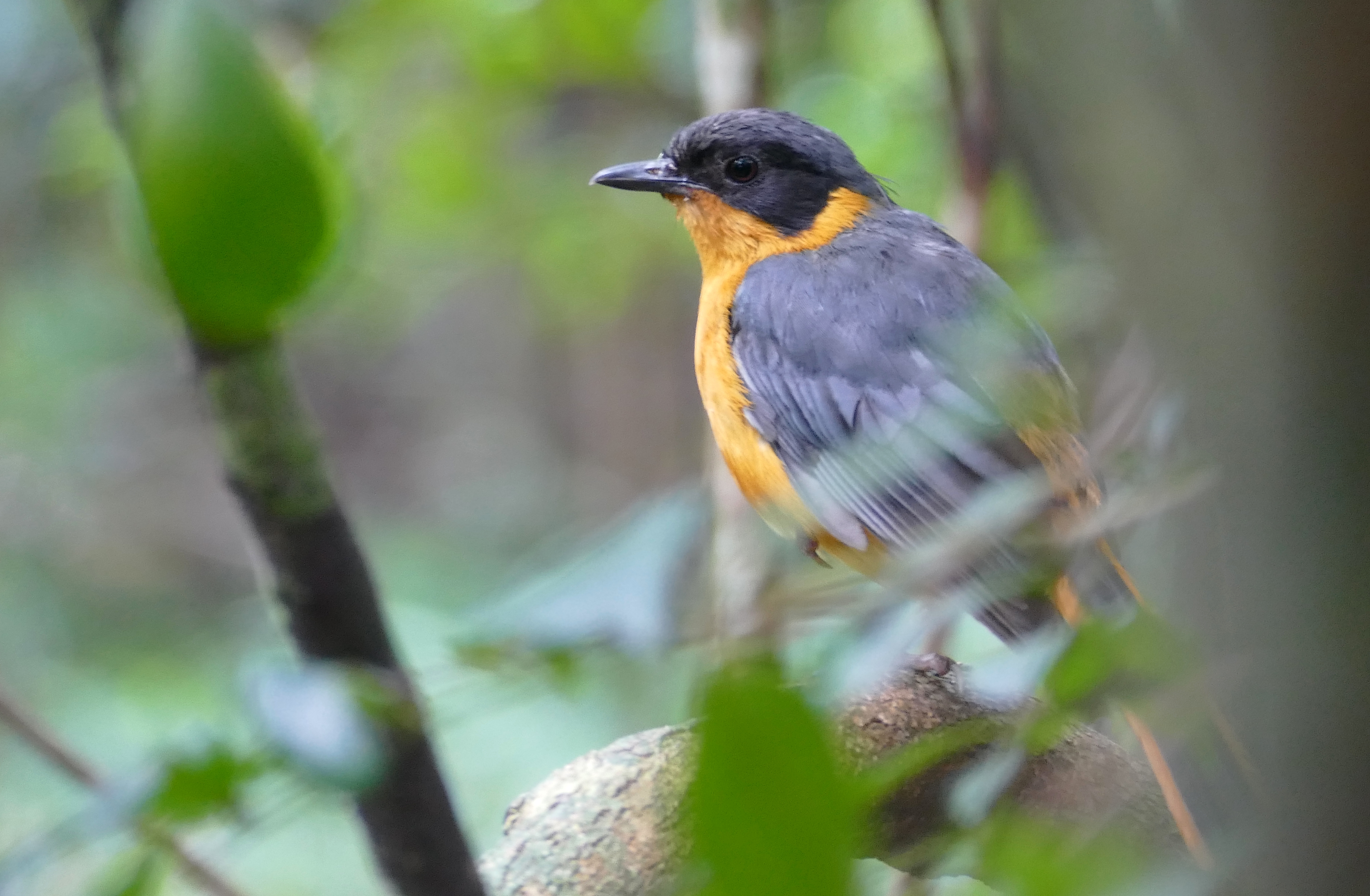
- Cossypha dichroa in the Reserve.
- Interactive map of Dlinza Forest Nature Reserve
- Location: KwaZulu-Natal, South Africa
- Nearest city: Eshowe
- Coordinates: 28°53′40″S 31°26′56″E
- Area: 250 ha (620 acres)
- Max. elevation: 500 m (1,600 ft)

Dlinza Forest Nature Reserve, is located just outside Eshowe, in the KwaZulu-Natal province of South Africa. This nature reserve is about 250 ha (620 acres) in area.

Dlinza Forest lies on a crown made of several hills and reaches a height of 500 m (1,600 ft) above sea level. The reserve features many tall trees and streams. 60 bird species, duikers, Cape bushbucks, vervet monkey, wild boars, and other animals live here. An elevated 125-metre-long (410 ft) trail and a 20-metre-high (66 ft) lookout tower offer a view of the forest canopy and give a view of the coast. There are two trails.

Due to its higher altitude, it is cooler than Eshowe. Therefore, the Zulu kings often preferred to stay there. During some of the wars in which the Zulu fought, the forest served as a hideout.

== See also ==
- Protected areas of South Africa
