= Caledon Nature Reserve =

Nature reserve in Free State, South Africa

- Location within Free State (South African province)
- Location: South-Eastern Free State
- Nearest city: Dewetsdorp and Wepener
- Coordinates: 29.91472°S 26.85277°E
- Area: 3,750 ha (9,300 acres)
- Governing body: Free State Parks and Tourism

Caledon Nature Reserve is situated 120 km south-east of Bloemfontein on the R701 road between Wepener and Smithfield in the Free State, South Africa. It is about 2,300 hectares in size.

The park is named after, and situated on the Caledon River, which is dammed at Welbedacht Dam close to the Lesotho border. This dam supplies Bloemfontein with water, the nature reserve is located on the western shore of the reservoir. Wepener (also close to the border) is its closest town.

In addition to the wide variety of birds, it is home to the Black wildebeest, Gemsbok, Impala, Blesbok, Red hartebeest, Springbok and Zebra. Two floating bush camps on rafts offer overnight accommodation for hikers and canoeists. On the shore, there are huts for self-catering and a lapa with braai facilities.

== Mammals in the reserve ==
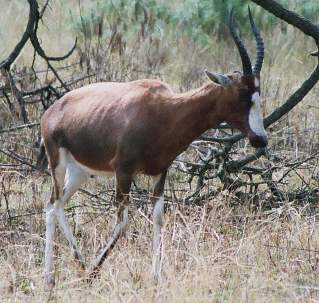
Blesbok

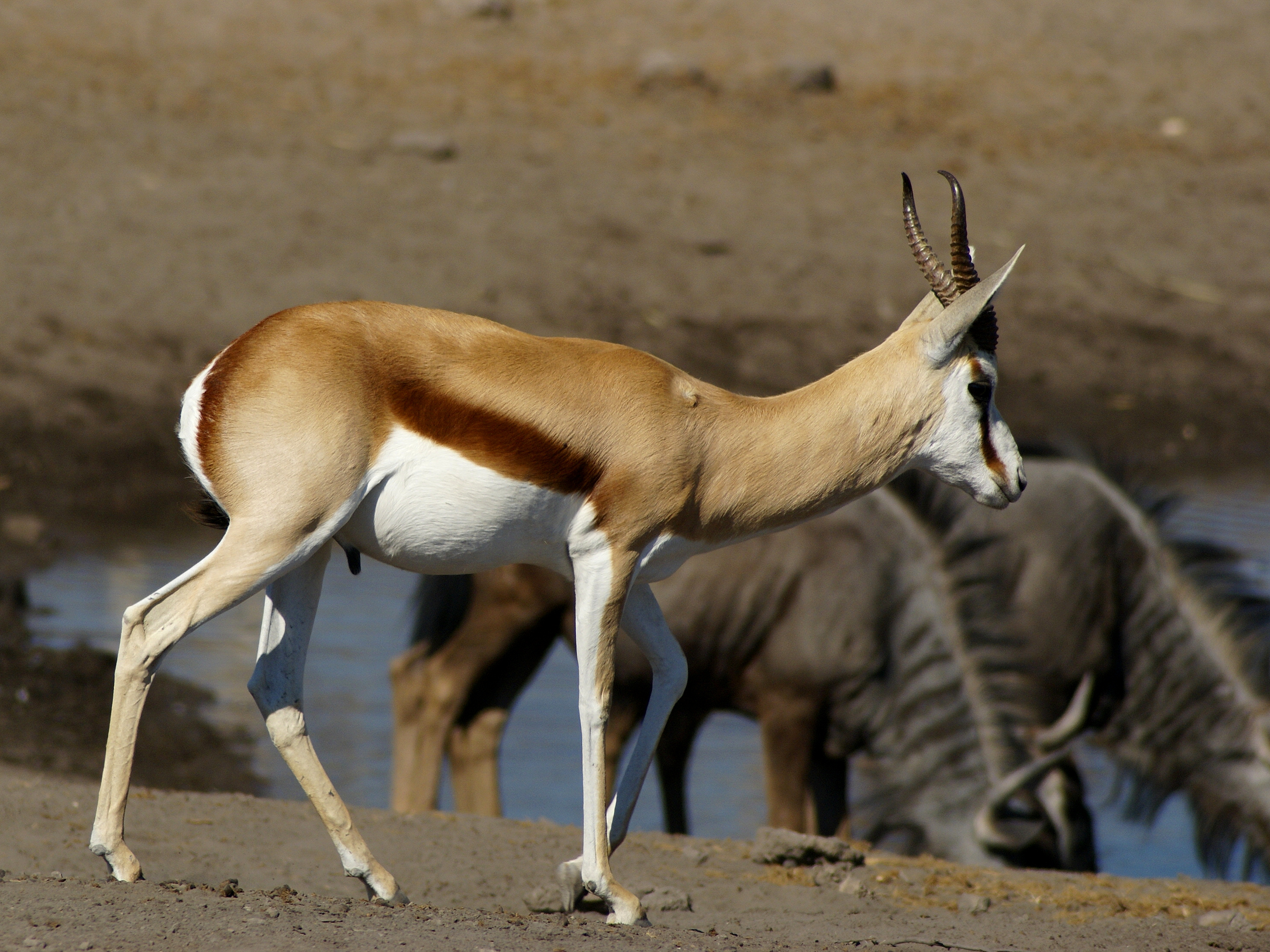
Springbok

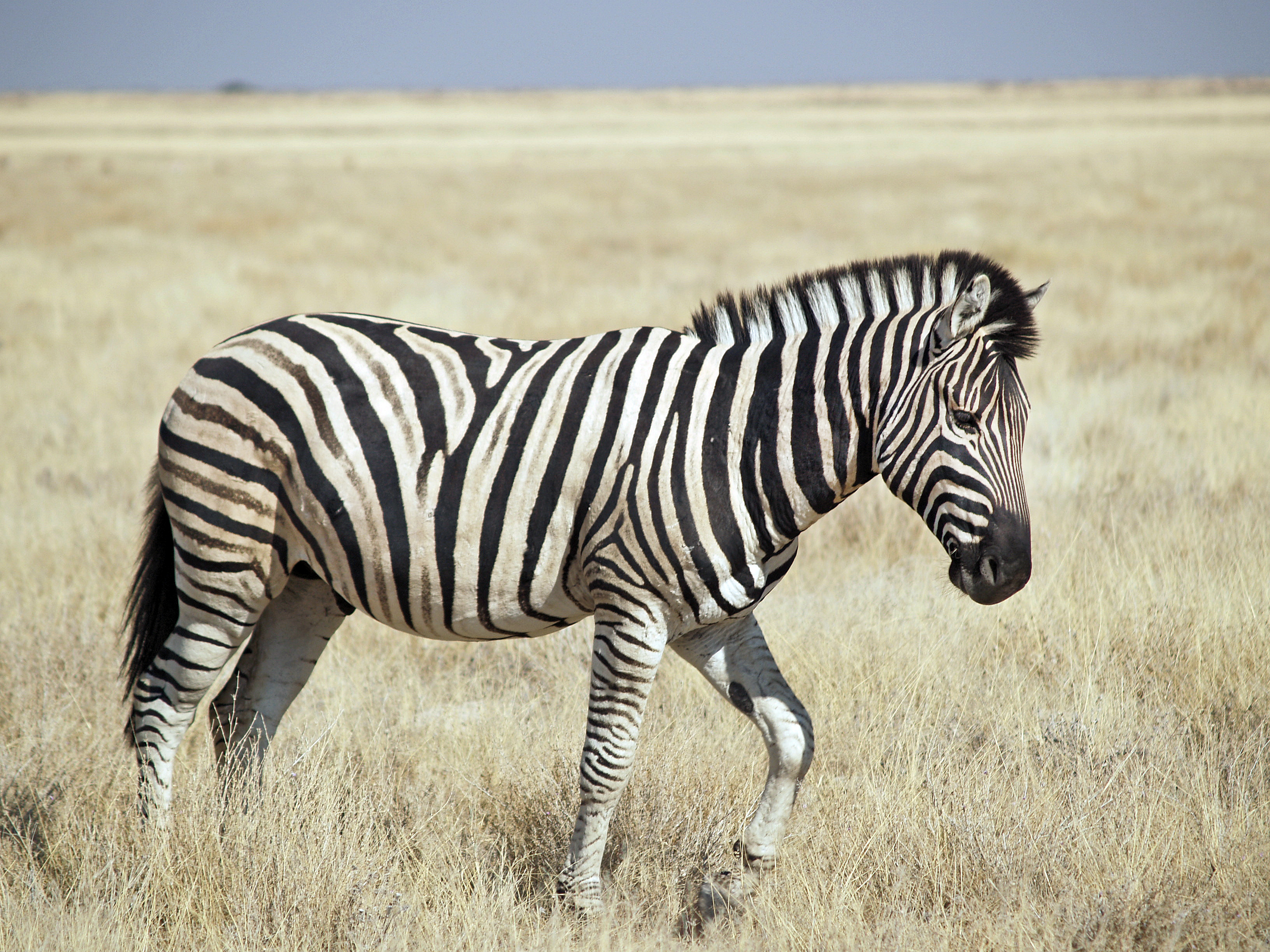
Burchell's Zebra

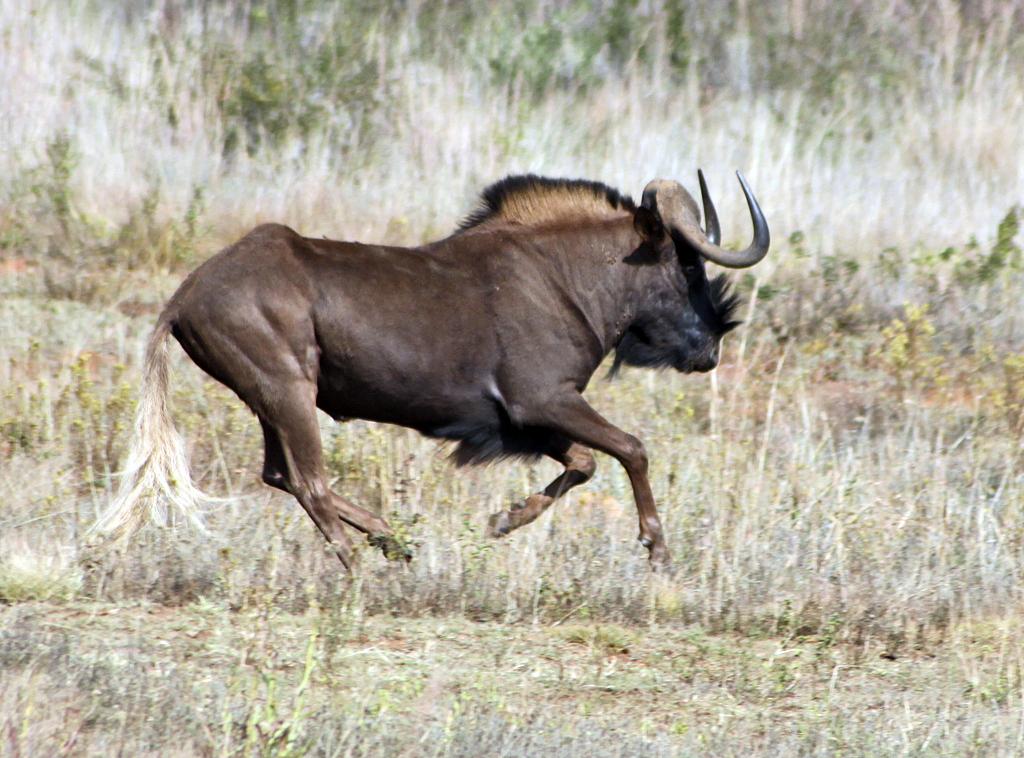
Black wildebeest
