= Botsalano Game Reserve =

- Location within North West (South African province)
- Location: North West Province, South Africa
- Nearest city: Mahikeng
- Coordinates: 25°52′18.12″S 25°42′47.16″E
- Established: 1985

Botsalano Game Reserve is a 5800 hectare game reserve near the City of Mafikeng. It is located on flat land which is Kalahari bushveld and Acacia and Karee woodlands. It is close to the town of Ramatlabama near the South Africa/Botswana Border.

This Game Reserves boasts over 2000 head of Rhino and Antelope. It is a prolific breeding ground for various antelope and has more than 200 identified bird species. Schools in Ramatlabama 600 like to go there and explore the park.
