= Mafikeng Game Reserve =

South African game reserve

- Location within North West (South African province)
- Location: North West Province, South Africa
- Nearest city: Mahikeng
- Coordinates: 25°52′18.12″S 25°43′28.92″E
- Established: 1982

Mafikeng Game Reserve is a game reserve in South Africa. Located in the city of Mafikeng, the reserve includes 46 km^{2} (18 sq mi) of Kalahari and Acacia bushveld, serving as the home of rhinoceroses, giraffes, gemsboks, buffaloes, wildebeests and springboks.
