= Cape Winelands Biosphere Reserve =

Protected area in Western Cape, South Africa

- Location within Western Cape
- Location: Western Cape, South Africa
- Nearest city: Cape Town
- Coordinates: 33.7500°S 19.0000°E
- Area: 322,030 ha (1,243.4 sq mi)
- Max. elevation: 1,860 m (6,100 ft)
- Min. elevation: 20 m (66 ft)
- Designation: 2007
- Administrator: Cape Winelands District Municipality
- Website: Official website

The Cape Winelands Biosphere Reserve is located in the Western Cape Province of South Africa approximately 40 km (25 mi) east of Cape Town. The Biosphere Reserve extends from the Kogelberg Biosphere Reserve in the south, northwards along the Cape Fold Belt Mountain Chain and the adjoining valleys constituting the Cape Winelands. The Biosphere Reserve incorporates key portions of the registered Cape Floral Region Protected Areas World Heritage Site. The Reserve was designated in 2007.

== General description ==
The Biosphere Reserve is characterised by a mosaic of diverse ecosystems and physiographic environments, and a gradation of land-uses and human settlement patterns associated with the world-renowned Cape Winelands viticultural landscape. The area includes an array of historic towns, hamlets and farmsteads, which are home to approximately 320 024 people.

Main economic activities in the area include agriculture, manufacturing, tourism, forestry, real estate, and business services. Agriculture forms the backbone of the economy with most of the other sectors being dependent on its strong backward and forward linkages.

The key management focal areas of the Biosphere Reserve include:

- coordination of conservation activities with the focus on protection of the Cape Floral Region Protected Areas World Heritage Site and its associated ecosystems;
- provision of a sustained flow of high-quality water to adjoining regions (including the Cape West Coast) and the City of Cape Town; and
- promotion of sustainable development in order to alleviate poverty and inequality.

Major ecosystem type
Cape Floral Kingdom incorporating Mountain Fynbos and Renosterveld.
Major habitats & land cover types

- Endangered vegetation types, including Mountain and Sand Plain
- Fynbos; various types of Renosterveld (e.g. Central Mountain Renosterveld, South and South-West Coast Renosterveld), and Little Succulent Karoo.
- Diversity of topographic features including a key portion of the Cape Fold Mountains, valleys and open plains, and a unique cultural landscape characterised by vineyards, pastures, wheat fields, commercial plantations, and a built environment characterised by the distinctive Cape Dutch architectural vernacular.

Location : 33° 18’ 0.19” to 34° 9’ 2.12” South; 18° 42’ 29.93” to 19° 29’ 5.99” East
Area (hectares) : 322,030
Core area(s) : 99,459
Buffer zone(s) : 133,844
Transition area(s) when given : 88,727
Altitude (metres above sea level) : 20 m to 1 860 m.

== Administrative authorities ==
The administrative authority is Cape Winelands District Municipality, in association with:

- Stellenbosch Municipality
- Drakenstein Municipality
- Breede River Municipality
- Witzenberg Municipality
- Theewaterskloof Municipality
- Western Cape Nature Conservation Board (operating as CapeNature)

== Research and monitoring ==
- Land-Care Program - Department of Agriculture.
- Stewardship Program - CapeNature.
- Biodiversity and Wine Initiative supported by, amongst others, the IUCN, CAPE (Cape Action for People and the Environment), Critical Ecosystems Partnership Fund, WWF-SA, Botanical Society of South Africa, Conservation International, and the South African Biodiversity Institute.
- Development of a seed germination database for Cape Fynbos species with horticultural potential - South African National Biodiversity Institute.
- Working for Water & Working on Fire Initiatives - Department of Water Affairs.
- Raptor Research Program - Percy Fitzpatrick Institute of African Ornithology, University of Cape Town
- Promotion of biodiversity, conservation and sustainable development in the Cape Floristic Region - Cape Action Plan for the Environment (C.A.P.E.), Global Environment Facility (GEF) and World Wide Fund for Nature (WWF).
- Studies on all aspects of invasion biology in the Western Cape and South Africa – fire ecology, biodiversity management, community ecology, etc. - Centre of Excellence for Invasion Biology, University of Stellenbosch
- Numerous projects undertaken by CSIR (Council of Scientific and Industrial Research).
- Numerous projects undertaken by Sustainability Institute of University of Stellenbosch.

== Sources ==
This article incorporates text from a free content work (license statement/permission). Text taken from UNESCO - MAB Biosphere Reserves Directory, UNESCO, UNESCO.
