= Salmonsdam Nature Reserve =

Nature reserve in the Overberg region of the Western Cape in South Africa

- Location within Western Cape
- Location: Overberg, Western Cape, South Africa
- Nearest city: Stanford, Western Cape
- Coordinates: 34°25′35″S 19°38′17″E
- Area: 834 ha (2,060 acres; 8.34 km^{2}; 3.22 sq mi)
- Established: 1962
- Governing body: CapeNature
- Website: www.capenature.org.za/reserves.htm?reserve=Salmonsdam+Nature+Reserve

Salmonsdam Nature Reserve is a nature reserve in the Overberg region of the Western Cape province of South Africa. It contains the mountain catchment area of the Paardensberg River in the Akkedisberg mountains. The reserve is administered by CapeNature and covers an area of 834 hectares (2,060 acres; 8.34 km^{2}; 3.22 sq mi).

== History ==
Local tradition claims that Salmonsdam was named for Robert Salmond, captain of HMS Birkenhead, which sank at Gansbaai in 1852. The area was declared a nature reserve by the Cape Provincial Administration in 1962.

== Geography ==
Salmonsdam is located in the Overstrand municipal area, 20 kilometres (12 mi) east of Stanford and about 150 km (93 mi) southeast of Cape Town. It encompasses the valley of the Paardensberg River and the surrounding mountain catchment area. The river flows from northeast to southwest, starting in a gorge called Keeromskloof and spreading out lower down into a marshy area known as "Die Weivlakte". Various smaller tributaries join the river; notably the Watervalkloof stream which passes over a series of small waterfalls called the "Zigzag Falls". On the eastern side of Keeromskloof can be found the Elandskrans Caves and Leopard Cave.

The highest point in the park is the base of the radio mast at its northeastern corner, at a height of 637 metres (2,090 ft) above sea level. The Perdeberg peak on the northern edge of the park is one metre (3.3 ft) lower.
