= Indalo Protected Environment =

Largest Protected Environment in the Eastern Cape

- Indalo Protected Environment location
- Location: Eastern Cape, South Africa
- Nearest city: Kenton-on-Sea
- Coordinates: 33°35′52″S 26°33′22″E
- Area: 76,076.59 ha (187,989.3 acres)
- Established: 13 April 2018
- Governing body: Eastern Cape Parks and Tourism Agency
- Website: www.indaloreserves.com
- Indalo Protected Environment (South Africa) Indalo Protected Environment (Eastern Cape)

Indalo Protected Environment is the largest Protected Environment in the Eastern Cape of South Africa. It is made up of nine private game reserves in three local municipalities.

== History ==
This 76,076.59 ha (187,989.3 acres) Protected Environment was designated in 2018.

Make up of the Indalo Protected Environment
Reserve name	Size (hectares)	Municipality
Amakhala Game Reserve	9,733.7	Sundays River Valley
Hopewell Game Reserve	2,730.94	Sundays River Valley
Kariega Game Reserve	7,936.78	Ndlambe
Kwandwe Game Reserve	18,988.04	Makana
Oceana Beach and Wildlife Reserve	724.72	Ndlambe
Pumba Game Reserve	5,837.10	Makana
Shamwari Game Reserve	20,338.58	Sundays River Valley
Sibuya Game Reserve	1,785.23	Ndlambe
Lalibela Game Reserve	8,001.46	Makana
Total	76,076.59	

== Biodiversity ==
This Protected Environment consists of six of the nine vegetation types of South Africa, including Fynbos and Albany thickets.

=== Birds ===
There are twelve threatened birds.

=== Fish ===
It contains two threatened fish, including the critically endangered estuarine pipefish.

=== Mammals ===
There are over 24,000 animals from 38 species, including big five game, with 15 being endangered like the black rhino.

=== Vegetation ===
There are sixty threatened plant species.

== Threats ==
Threats facing the Protected Environment are wind farms, poaching, and fracking and mining.

== See also ==
- List of protected areas of South Africa
