= Pumba Private Game Reserve =

Pumba Private Game Reserve (2004) is an ecotourism business and home to a pride of white lions. This 20 000 hectare private game reserve, located near to Makhanda, was established on farmland that Piet Retief once owned. The Pumba Foundation is committed to “responsible tourism, conservation, education, community and social upliftment.”
