= Woody Cape Nature Reserve =

Coordinates: 33.7190°S 26.5140°E

The Woody Cape Nature Reserve is a 250 km^{2} (97 sq mi) conservation area in Eastern Cape, South Africa.

Mammals such as bushpig, bushbuck, Cape Grysbok, steenbok, common duiker, Vervet monkey, and large and small grey mongoose are represented in the reserve.

The most common trees are Ochna, Apodytes, Cassine and Sideroxylon.
