= East London Coast Nature Reserve =

Protected area in Eastern Cape Province, South Africa

- Location within Eastern Cape
- Location: Indian Ocean shore
- Nearest city: East London
- Coordinates: 32°58′43″S 27°57′28″E
- Area: 3,424 ha (8,460 acres)
- Governing body: Eastern Cape Parks

East London Coast Nature Reserve is a grouping of protected areas in the Eastern Cape, South Africa that is managed by Eastern Cape Parks. It covers an area of 3,424 hectares and incorporates 12 smaller nature reserves and protected areas.

The main causes for its existence are the preservation of the region's biodiversity, protection of natural vegetation and management of alien vegetation.

== Parks ==
The nature reserve is built up from various disconnected smaller parks, and has a total area of 3,424 hectares. It extends from the Great Kei River in the east to the Tyolomnqa River (Chalumna) in the west, along about 250 km of coastline. The parks are:

=== Coastal parks ===
- Cape Morgan Nature Reserve
- Double Mouth Nature Reserve
- Cape Henderson Nature Reserve
- Gulu Nature Reserve
- Kwelera Nature Reserve (accessed through the Kwelera National Botanical Garden)
- Nahoon Nature Reserve
- Gonubie
- Kidd's Beach
- Kayser's Beach
- Chalumna
- Chintsa West

=== Inland parks ===
Among the forested parks located a little inland are the following:

- Fort Pato Nature Reserve
- Umtiza Nature Reserve

== See also ==
- South African National Parks
- Protected areas of South Africa
