= Kei Mouth =

- Location within Eastern Cape Location within South Africa Location within Africa
- Coordinates: 32°40′S 28°22′E
- Country: South Africa
- Province: Eastern Cape
- District: Amathole
- Municipality: Great Kei

Government
  - Type: Part of a local municipality

Area
  - Total: 2.07 km^{2} (0.80 sq mi)

Population (2011)
  - Total: 291
  - Density: 141/km^{2} (364/sq mi)

Racial makeup (2011)
  - Black African: 7.6%
  - Indian/Asian: 0.7%
  - White: 91.4%
  - Other: 0.3%

First languages (2011)
  - English: 64.2%
  - Afrikaans: 29.0%
  - Xhosa: 4.3%
  - Tswana: 1.1%
  - Other: 1.4%
- Time zone: UTC+2 (SAST)
- Postal code (street): 5260
- PO box: 5260
- Area code: 043
- Website: Kei Mouth

Kei Mouth (Afrikaans: Keimond) is a resort town on the southeast coast of South Africa, situated in the Wild Coast region of the Eastern Cape Province, situated 94 kilometres from the city of East London. The town is situated on the Indian Ocean coast, on the western bank of the Great Kei River, and has one of the country's three remaining car transporting pontoon river ferries.

== History ==
The town of Kei Mouth was created by the British after the 8th Frontier War, as part of the frontline of a buffer zone aimed at protecting British Kaffraria from the warring Xhosa tribes.

Huberta, the famous Hippo, took up residence in the Kei River just above third cave in 1930. She was eventually chased off and continued her journey southward once more.

== Sports ==
Bowls and Golf are favoured pastimes in Kei Mouth. The Kei Mouth Country Club has a 12-hole golf course and there is a bowling green and a squash court adjacent to the campsite. The country club is the venue for a weekly parkrun.

Other sporting activities include mountain biking, horse riding and water sports such as surfing, swimming, fishing, boating and windsurfing.

== Tourism ==
The economy of Kei Mouth revolves largely around tourism due to its location at the southern entrance to the erstwhile Transkei region. Whilst many of the residents are retirees, a large portion of homes are holiday homes owned by families from the interior. There are several accommodation establishments, a municipal campsite, multiple restaurants and bars, one supermarket (Savemor), a shop (Rainbow Supermarket) and a fuel station..

Nearby resort towns include: Qolora Mouth, Morgan Bay, Haga Haga and Chintsa

== Demographics ==
The main languages spoken in Kei Mouth are English, Xhosa and Afrikaans. The town is home to a large number of retirees, thanks to the mild climate and holiday atmosphere.
