= Entle Protected Environment =

Protected Environment in the Eastern Cape in South Africa

- Location within Eastern Cape
- Location: Eastern Cape, South Africa
- Nearest city: between Haga Haga and Morgans Bay
- Coordinates: 32.731135381516225°S 28.2825944681423851°E
- Area: 109.02 ha (269.4 acres)
- Established: 13 May 2019
- Governing body: Eastern Cape Parks and Tourism Agency

Entle Protected Environment is a section of protected land near Haga Haga and the Double Mouth Nature Reserve. Off the coast is the Amathole Marine Protected Area.

== History ==
This 109.02 ha (269.4 acres) protected area was established in 2019.

== See also ==
- List of protected areas of South Africa
