= Double Mouth Nature Reserve =

Coastal forest reserve in the Eastern Cape

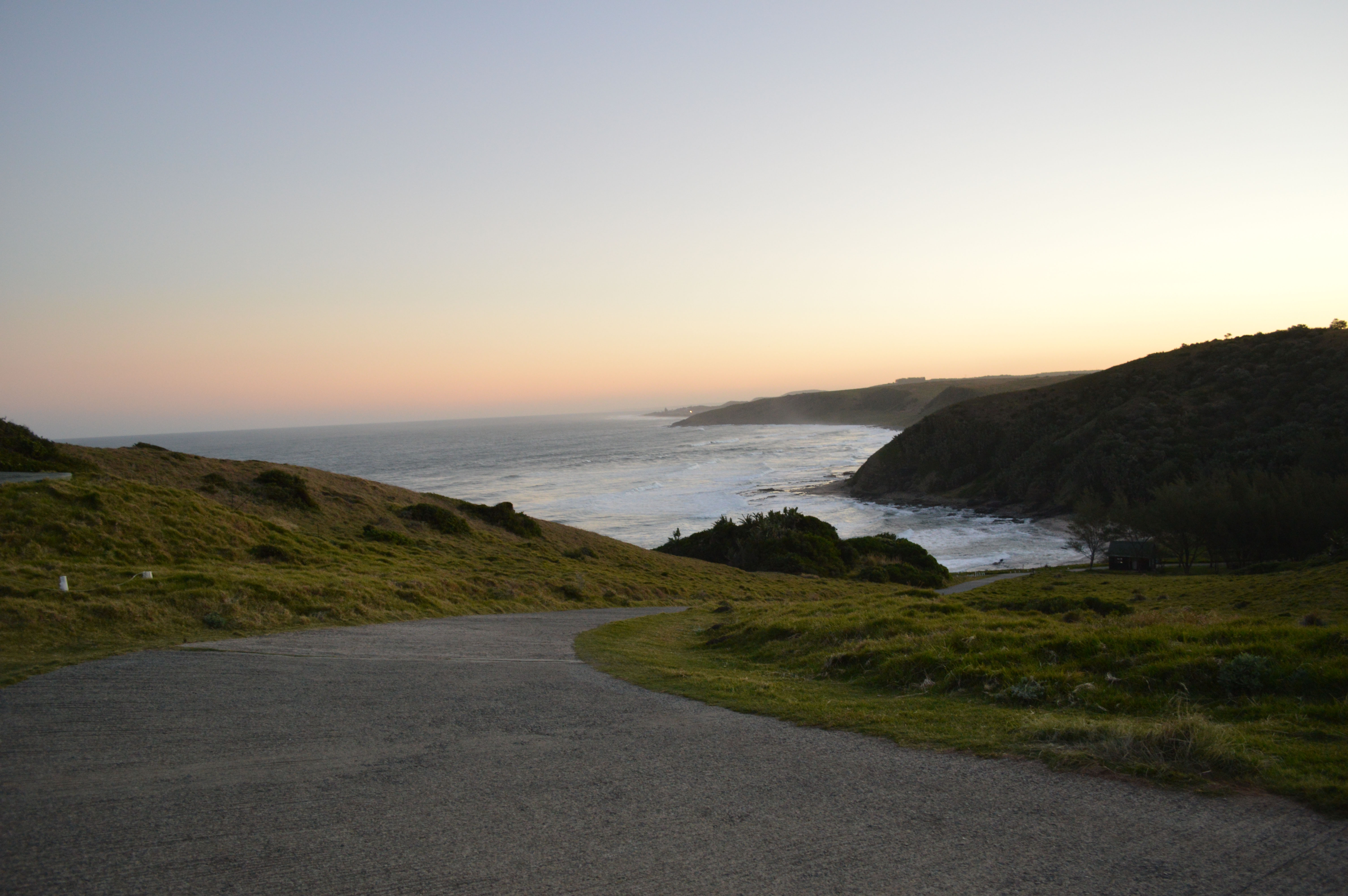
- Type: Nature Reserve
- Location: Morgan Bay
- Nearest city: East London, Eastern Cape
- Coordinates: 32°43′26″S 28°18′50″E
- Administered by: Eastern Cape Parks
- Camp sites: 30
- Website: Eastern Cape Parks & Tourism Agency
- Double Mouth Nature Reserve (South Africa) Double Mouth Nature Reserve (Eastern Cape)

The Double Mouth Nature Reserve, part of the greater East London Coast Nature Reserve, is a coastal reserve in the Wild Coast region of the Eastern Cape. Alongside it are the Quko River mouth and the 50-metre high Morgan Bay Cliffs.

== Biodiversity ==
The mouth of the Quko River which forms an estuary and the nearby forested dunes host a large number of birds and animals.

=== Mammals ===
This includes the Cape bushbuck, blue duiker, mongoose, vervet monkeys, porcupines, legavaan, jackals and the endangered African clawless otter.

=== Birds ===
Raptors such as the African fish eagle, Cape vulture, spotted eagle-owl and African wood owl.

== Activities ==
The Double Mouth Nature Reserve offers fishing, camping, dolphin spotting, mountain biking and hiking trails.

On the Bead Beach in the reserve money cowries, Chinese Ming porcelain and Carnelian beads can sometimes be found; this is thought to come from the Santo Espirito shipwreck in 1608.

Nearby is the protected village of Haga Haga, the Morgan Bay Cliffs and Cape Morgan Nature Reserve.

== Gallery ==
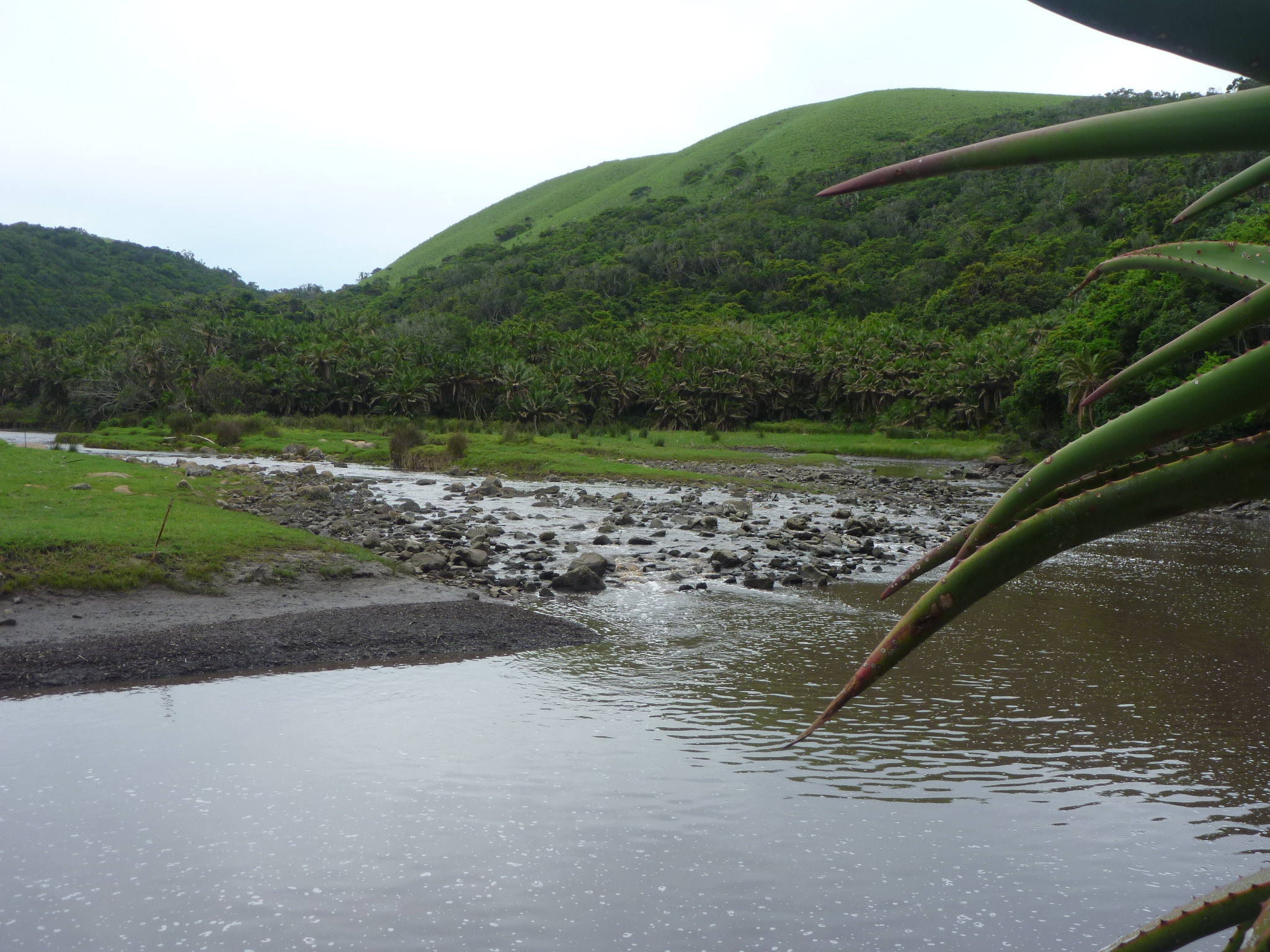
Double Mouth Lagoon on the western edge of the reserve.

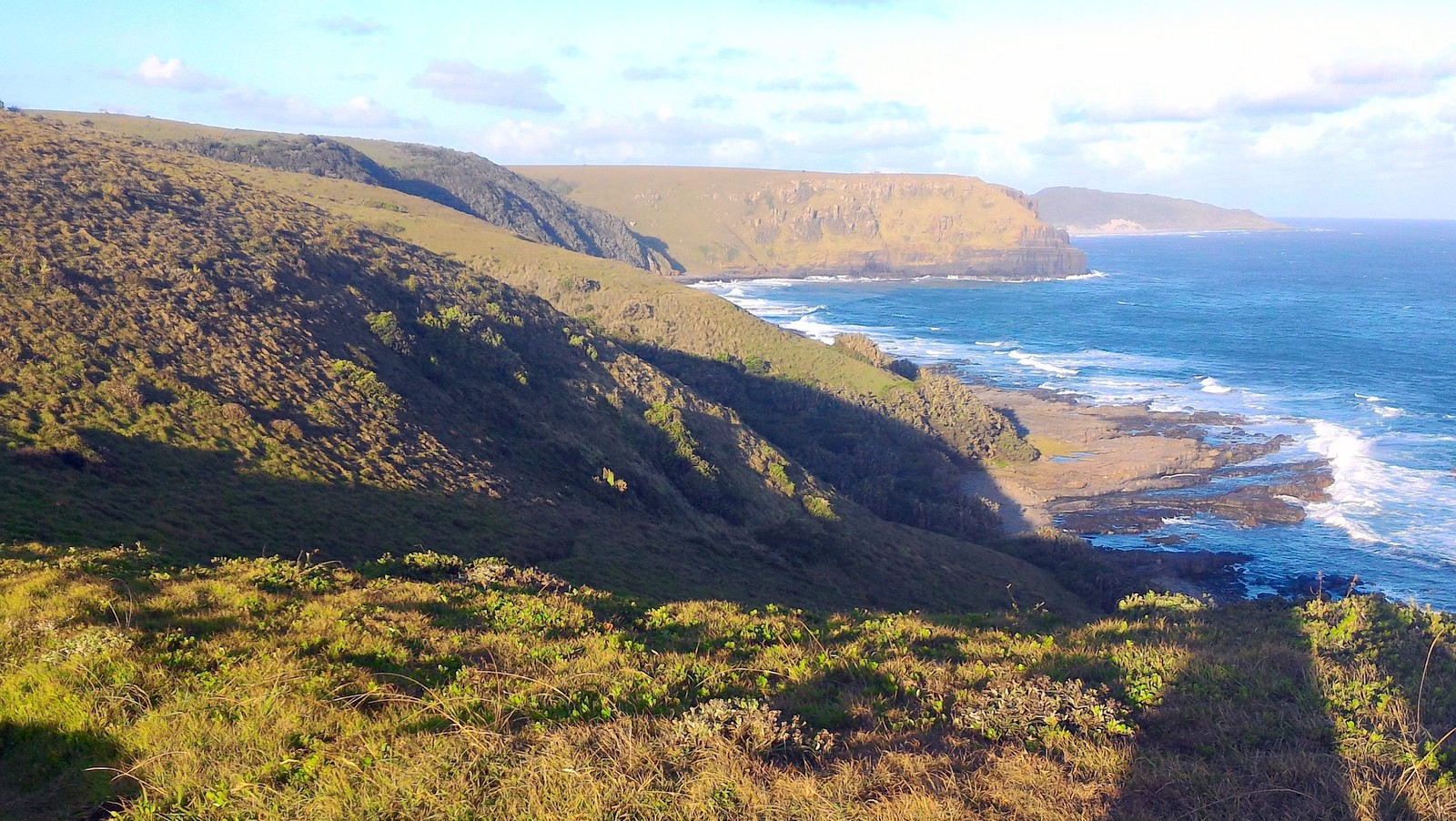
Double Mouth view east towards Morgan Bay

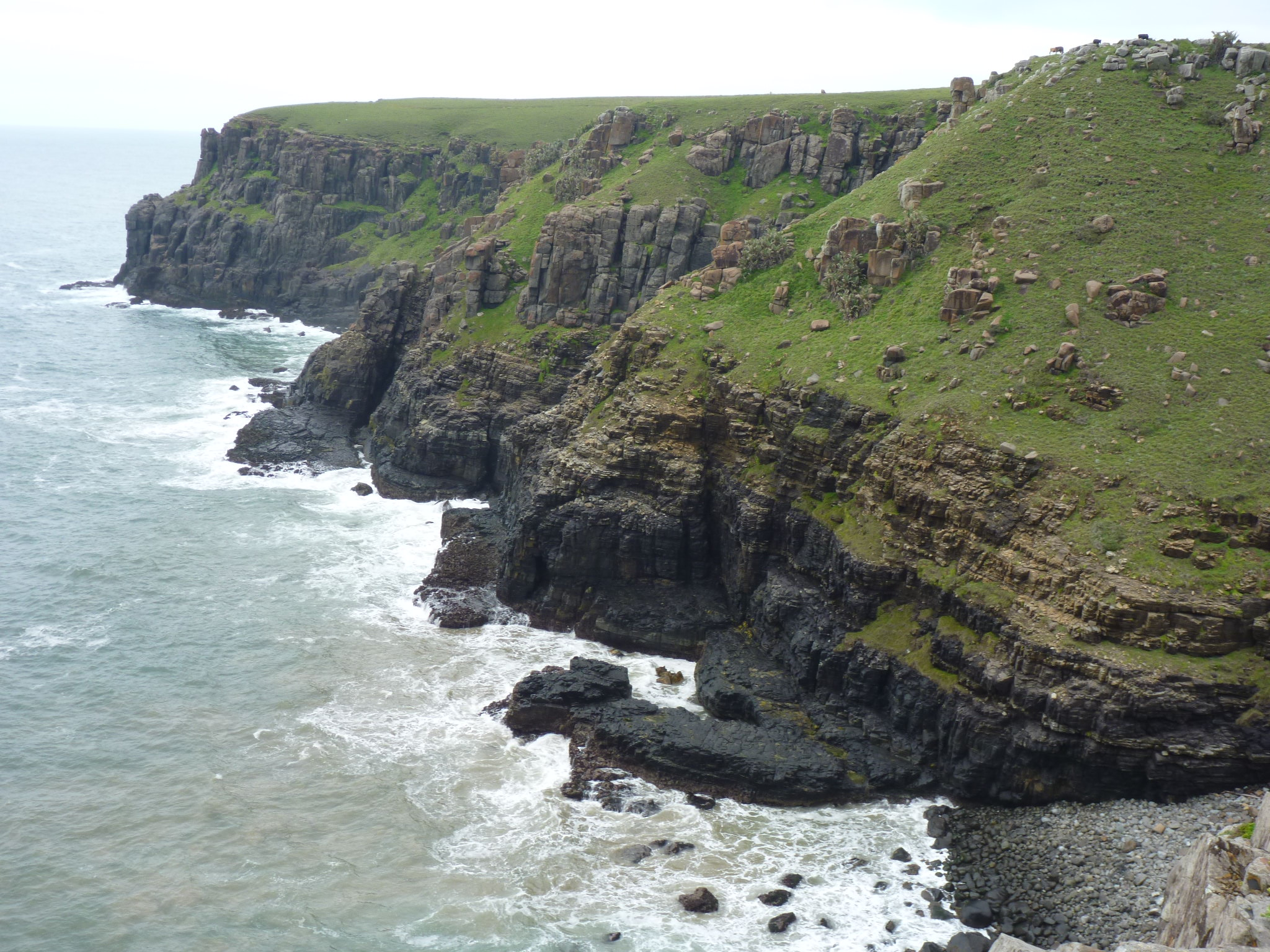
Morgan Bay Cliffs on the eastern edge of the reserve.

== See also ==
- Doornkop Fish and Wildlife Reserve
- List of protected areas of South Africa
