= Cape Morgan Nature Reserve =

Coastal forest reserve in the Eastern Cape

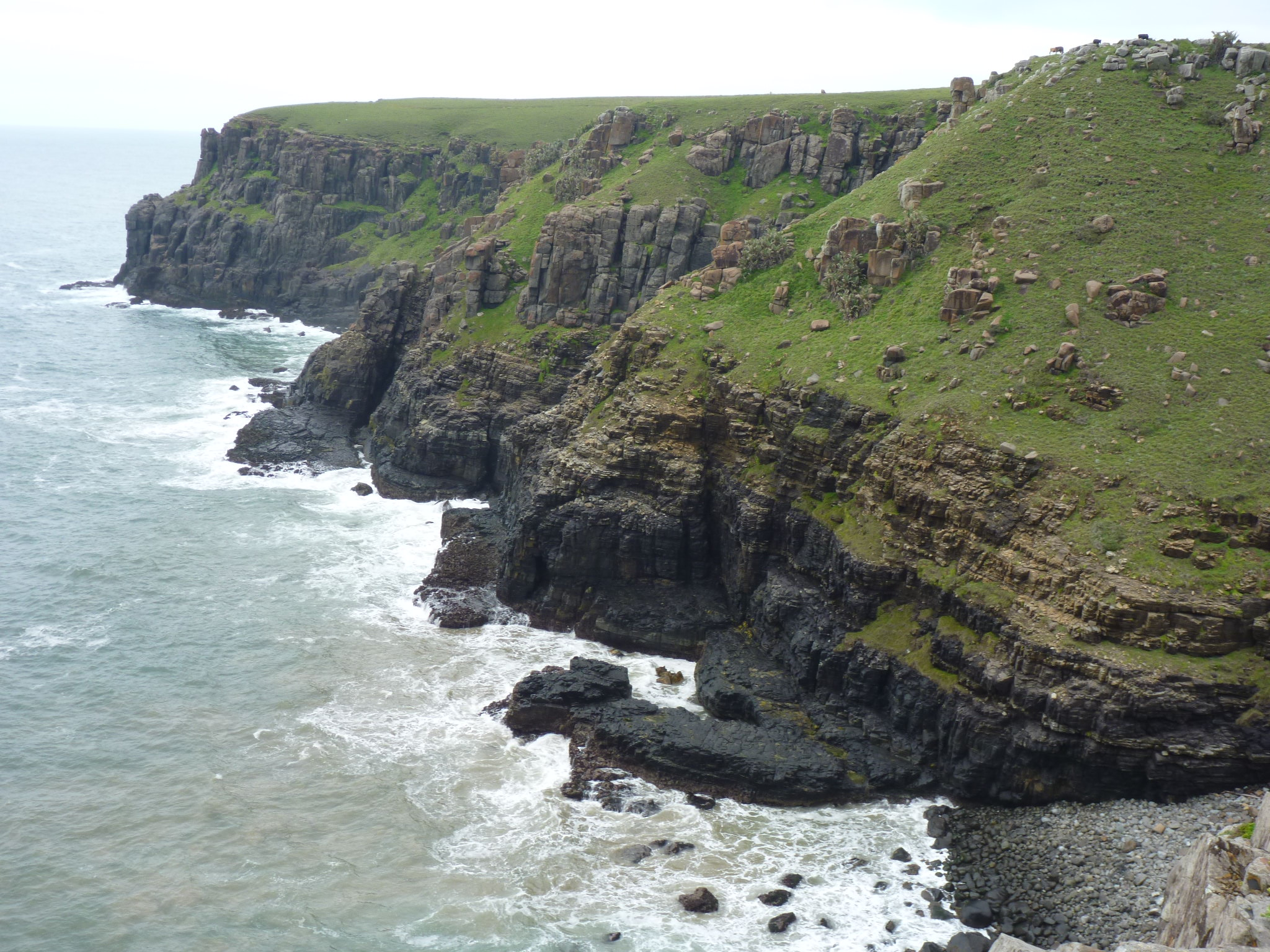
- Morgan Bay cliffs
- Nearest city: Morgan Bay
- Coordinates: 32°42′10″S 28°21′27″E
- Administrator: Eastern Cape Parks
- Cape Morgan Nature Reserve (South Africa)
- The rightmost Kei section of the Amathole Marine Protected Area is found off its coast.

The Cape Morgan Nature Reserve, nestled within the expansive East London Coast Nature Reserve, is a coastal forest reserve in the Wild Coast region of the Eastern Cape. On its western side, lies the Morgan Bay estuary, while it is flanked on the eastern side by the Cwili estuary. Nearby are the villages of Morgan Bay and Kei Mouth. Southwest of the reserve is the Morgan Bay beach. Its shoreline is enclosed by the Kei section of the Amathole Marine Protected Area.

== History ==
Constructed in 1964 within the Cape Morgan Nature Reserve, the Cape Morgan Lighthouse stands as one of four lighthouses adorning the Wild Coast. In August 2020, a draft was prepared to develop accommodation facilities and a parking area for the existing Eastern Cape Parks' Conference Centre situated in the reserve. The visitor centre is located on the ruins of an old titanium mine.

== Activities ==
=== Hiking ===
The 57 km Strandloper Hiking Trail starts at the visitor centre in the reserve and ends at the Gonubie River mouth.

=== Swimming ===
There's a tide pool on the coast of the reserve.

== Gallery ==
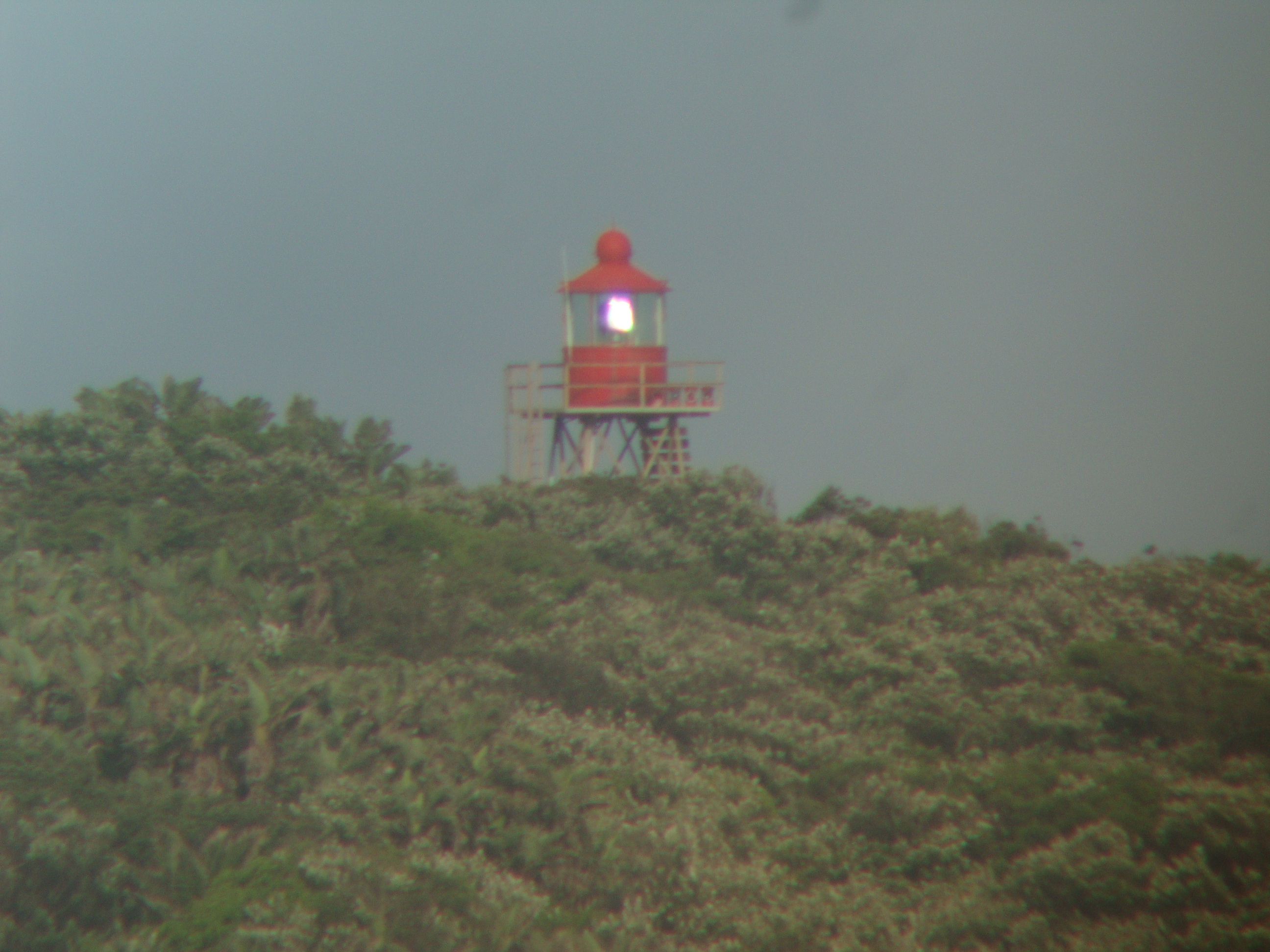
Morgan Bay Lighthouse

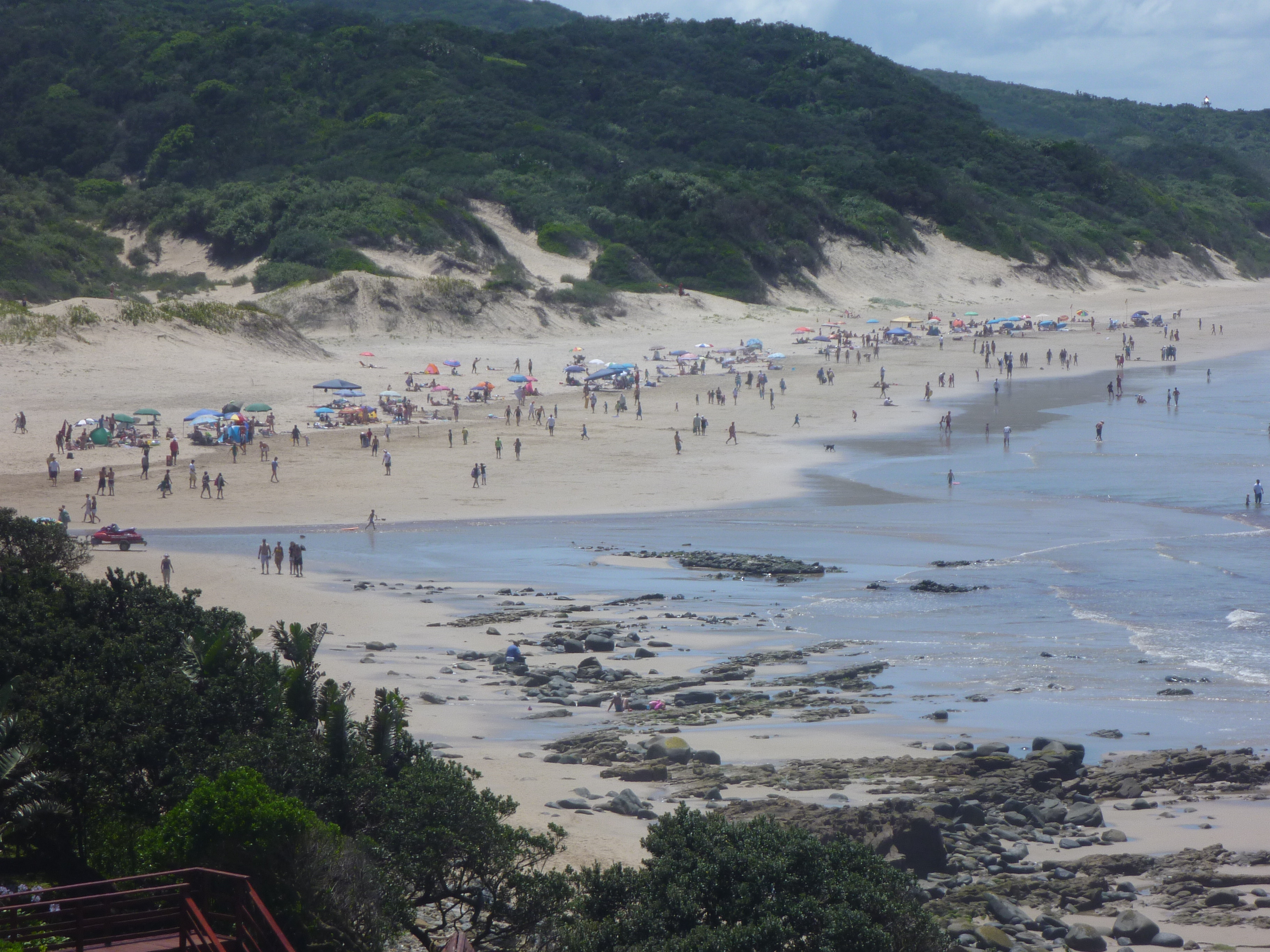
Morgan Bay dune forest and the beach.

== See also ==
- List of protected areas of South Africa
