= Great Kei Local Municipality elections =

Local elections in the Eastern Cape, South Africa

The Great Kei Local Municipality council (within the South African Amathole District Municipality) consists of thirteen members elected by mixed-member proportional representation. Seven are elected by first-past-the-post voting in seven wards, while the remaining six are chosen from party lists so that the total number of party representatives is proportional to the number of votes received.

In the election of 4 November 2026 the African National Congress (ANC) won a majority of seven seats.

== Results ==
The following table shows the composition of the council after past elections.

Event	ANC	DA	EFF	Other	Total
2000 election	11	1	—	0	12
2006 election	10	1	—	1	12
2011 election	11	2	—	—	13
2016 election	9	2	1	1	13
2021 election	9	3	1	0	13
2026 election	7	2	1	3	13

== December 2000 election ==
The following table shows the results of the 2000 election.

Party	Ward			List			Total seats
Party	Votes	%	Seats	Votes	%	Seats	Total seats
African National Congress	10,344	87.59	6	10,560	91.41	5	11
Democratic Alliance	504	4.27	0	748	6.48	1	1
African Christian Democratic Party	391	3.31	0	244	2.11	0	0
Independent candidates	571	4.83	0				0
Total	11,810	100.00	6	11,552	100.00	6	12
Valid votes	11,810	97.25		11,552	95.12		
Invalid/blank votes	334	2.75		593	4.88		
Total votes	12,144	100.00		12,145	100.00		
Registered voters/turnout	18,173	66.82		18,173	66.83		

== March 2006 election ==
The following table shows the results of the 2006 election.

Party	Ward			List			Total seats
Party	Votes	%	Seats	Votes	%	Seats	Total seats
African National Congress	11,209	85.16	6	11,283	86.03	4	10
Democratic Alliance	703	5.34	0	711	5.42	1	1
Independent Democrats	566	4.30	0	589	4.49	1	1
United Democratic Movement	295	2.24	0	403	3.07	0	0
Independent candidates	285	2.17	0				0
Pan Africanist Congress of Azania	104	0.79	0	129	0.98	0	0
Total	13,162	100.00	6	13,115	100.00	6	12
Valid votes	13,162	98.94		13,115	98.67		
Invalid/blank votes	141	1.06		177	1.33		
Total votes	13,303	100.00		13,292	100.00		
Registered voters/turnout	21,025	63.27		21,025	63.22		

== May 2011 election ==
The following table shows the results of the 2011 election.

Party	Ward			List			Total seats
Party	Votes	%	Seats	Votes	%	Seats	Total seats
African National Congress	10,579	83.42	7	10,790	84.61	4	11
Democratic Alliance	2,103	16.58	0	1,962	15.39	2	2
Total	12,682	100.00	7	12,752	100.00	6	13
Valid votes	12,682	97.52		12,752	98.15		
Invalid/blank votes	323	2.48		240	1.85		
Total votes	13,005	100.00		12,992	100.00		
Registered voters/turnout	21,302	61.05		21,302	60.99		

== August 2016 election ==
The following table shows the results of the 2016 election.

Party	Ward			List			Total seats
Party	Votes	%	Seats	Votes	%	Seats	Total seats
African National Congress	7,237	67.21	5	7,604	74.54	4	9
Democratic Alliance	1,986	18.44	1	2,026	19.86	1	2
Independent candidates	1,034	9.60	1				1
Economic Freedom Fighters	489	4.54	0	523	5.13	1	1
Pan Africanist Congress of Azania	22	0.20	0	48	0.47	0	0
Total	10,768	100.00	7	10,201	100.00	6	13
Valid votes	10,768	98.78		10,201	97.27		
Invalid/blank votes	133	1.22		286	2.73		
Total votes	10,901	100.00		10,487	100.00		
Registered voters/turnout	17,685	61.64		17,685	59.30		

== November 2021 election ==
The following table shows the results of the 2021 election.

Party	Ward			List			Total seats
Party	Votes	%	Seats	Votes	%	Seats	Total seats
African National Congress	6,227	63.89	7	6,518	67.36	2	9
Democratic Alliance	1,434	14.71	0	1,807	18.67	3	3
Economic Freedom Fighters	782	8.02	0	1,031	10.65	1	1
Independent candidates	1,038	10.65	0				0
Good	165	1.69	0	170	1.76	0	0
United Democratic Movement	60	0.62	0	91	0.94	0	0
African Transformation Movement	40	0.41	0	60	0.62	0	0
Total	9,746	100.00	7	9,677	100.00	6	13
Valid votes	9,746	98.60		9,677	98.29		
Invalid/blank votes	138	1.40		168	1.71		
Total votes	9,884	100.00		9,845	100.00		
Registered voters/turnout	17,935	55.11		17,935	54.89		

== November 2026 election ==
The following table shows the results of the 2026 election.

Party	Ward			List			Total seats
Party	Votes	%	Seats	Votes	%	Seats	Total seats
African National Congress	6,000	47.00	6	6,225	49.67	1	7
Great Kei Community Movement	2,109	16.52	0	2,154	17.19	2	2
Democratic Alliance	2,089	16.37	1	2,093	16.70	1	2
Economic Freedom Fighters	711	5.57	0	856	6.83	1	1
South African Communist Party	604	4.73	0	596	4.76	1	1
Independent candidates	738	5.78	0				0
Freedom Front Plus	291	2.28	0	282	2.25	0	0
African Transformation Movement	77	0.60	0	108	0.86	0	0
African Christian Democratic Party	43	0.34	0	60	0.48	0	0
Patriotic Alliance	43	0.34	0	59	0.47	0	0
Afrika Mayibuye Movement	38	0.30	0	44	0.35	0	0
uMkhonto weSizwe Party	12	0.09	0	48	0.38	0	0
Arusha Economic Coalition	10	0.08	0	7	0.06	0	0
Total	12,765	100.00	7	12,532	100.00	6	13
Valid votes	12,765	97.64		12,532	95.85		
Invalid/blank votes	309	2.36		542	4.15		
Total votes	13,074	100.00		13,074	100.00		
Registered voters/turnout	20,818	62.80		20,818	62.80		
