= Kwelera Nature Reserve =

Coastal forest reserve in the Eastern Cape

- Location: Wild Coast Region, Eastern Cape, South Africa
- Nearest city: Gonubie
- Coordinates: 32°54′43″S 28°04′05″E
- Area: 200 hectares (490 acres)
- Created: 23 December 1983; 42 years ago
- Administrator: Eastern Cape Parks and South African National Biodiversity Institute
- Kwelera Nature Reserve (South Africa) Kwelera Nature Reserve (Eastern Cape)

The Kwelera Nature Reserve is a coastal dune forest reserve in the Wild Coast region of the Eastern Cape, South Africa. Access to the reserve is through the adjacent Kwelera National Botanical Garden, where the reserve now serves as the natural portion of the garden. The reserve stretches from the Kwelera River on the eastern side, to the Gqunube River (Gonubie) at the western end of the reserve. It is a park in the greater East London Coast Nature Reserve.

== Etymology ==
Kwelera is the anglicised Khoi word for 'place of aloes'.

== History ==
The 200-hectare (490-acre) reserve was created in 1983 along with the Gulu Nature Reserve and Cape Henderson Nature Reserve for the conservation of the region's fauna and flora.

In 2014, 10.48 hectares (25.9 acres) were purchased by SANBI for the creation of the Kwelera National Botanical Garden; this land would be added to the reserve and become the first national botanical in the Eastern Cape. It would be jointly managed by SANBI and Eastern Cape Parks.

=== Kwelera Island Local Nature Reserve ===
In 1994, the 6.96 ha (17.2 acres) Kwelera Island Local Nature Reserve was established as a protected area at the mouth of the Kwelera River. It is found opposite the reserve.

== Geography ==
The highest peak, named Magozo, is a 77-metre high dune in the coastal dune forest. The village of Kwelera is surrounded by the reserve.

== Biodiversity ==
This reserve, flanked on either side by estuaries, consists of coastal dune vegetation that hosts a profusion of wildlife, which include:

=== Birds ===
Emerald-spotted wood dove, fish eagle, heron and Knysna turaco.

=== Fish ===
Bluefish, mullet, rays, Sand sharks and strepies.

=== Insects ===
The rare deceptive diadem butterfly.

=== Mammals ===
Small buck like blue duiker and bushbuck, caracals, porcupine, vervet monkeys, whales and dolphins.

=== Reptiles ===
Puff adder.

=== Vegetation ===
The subtropical and temperate zone vegetation receives on average 800mm of rainfall a year. White milkwood, red milkwood and silver oak are found throughout the reserve. The flame lily, paintbrush lily and orchids are also found under cover of the milkwoods and oaks. Other flowering plants found on the reserve are the sour fig, winter poker, Haemanthus albiflos, num-num and Clematis brachiata. Sea pumpkin are instrumental in stabilising the dunes. Also found along the coast is the wild banana and aloe.

== Trails ==
The Strandloper Trail traverses across the reserve to Gonubie.

== See also ==
- List of protected areas of South Africa
