= South African Airways Flight 406 =

1967 aviation accident

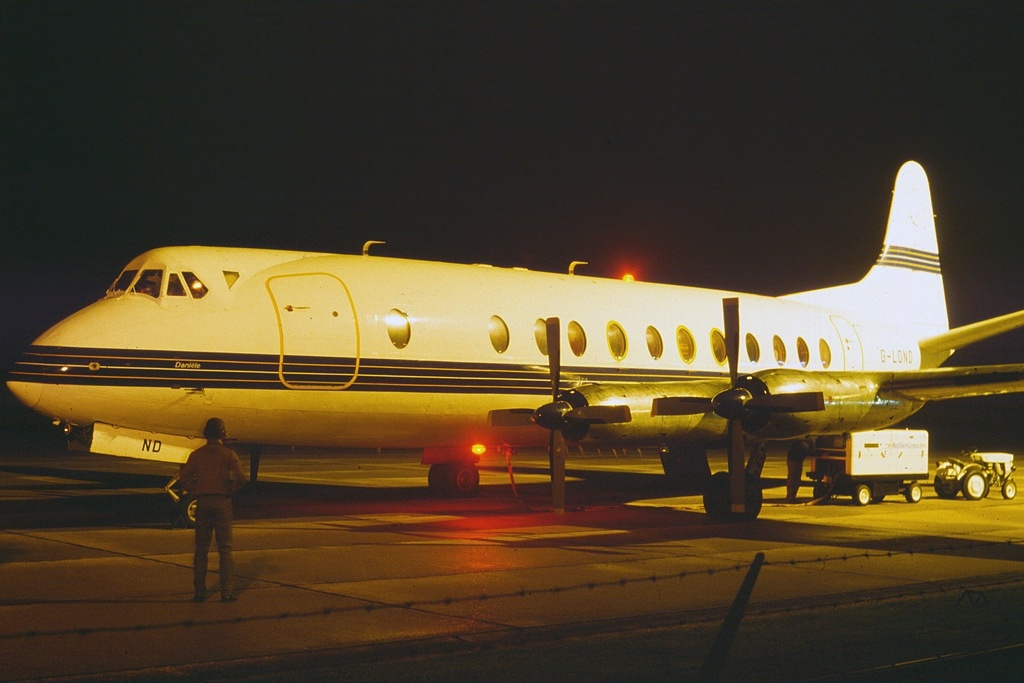
- A Viscount 806, similar to the accident aircraft

Accident
- Date: 13 March 1967
- Summary: Loss of control for unknown reasons; possible pilot incapacitation or in-flight structural failure
- Site: Indian Ocean off Kayser's Beach, Cape Province, South Africa; 33°13.45′S 27°38.3′E

Aircraft
- Aircraft type: Vickers Viscount 818
- Aircraft name: Rietbok
- Operator: South African Airways
- IATA flight No.: SA406
- ICAO flight No.: SAA406
- Call sign: SPRINGBOK 406
- Registration: ZS-CVA
- Flight origin: H.F. Verwoerd Airport, Port Elizabeth
- 1st stopover: Ben Schoeman Airport, East London
- 2nd stopover: J.B.M. Hertzog Airport, Bloemfontein
- Destination: Jan Smuts Int'l Airport, Johannesburg
- Occupants: 25
- Passengers: 20
- Crew: 5
- Fatalities: 25
- Survivors: 0

South African Airways Flight 406, also known as The Rietbok Crash, was a scheduled passenger flight on 13 March 1967 that crashed into the sea on approach to East London, South Africa. All 25 passengers and crew on board were killed. The cause of the accident was never determined. However, the air accident report speculated, without supporting evidence, that the captain of the plane suffered a heart attack while on approach and the first officer was unable to regain control of the aircraft. Like the crash of South African Airways Flight 295 two decades later, there was, and still is, great contention about the ultimate cause of the aircraft accident.

== Day of accident ==
Captain Lipawsky's day started with a flight departing from Johannesburg in the afternoon on a flight to Port Elizabeth with stopovers in Bloemfontein and East London. After take-off from Jan Smuts Airport (now O. R. Tambo International Airport), the front nosewheel would not retract due to mechanical malfunction. The aircraft returned to the airport and after repairs resumed the flight. At 3:50 pm GMT, the plane landed in East London in poor weather. On departure from East London, the plane suffered a bird strike and was inspected upon landing at Port Elizabeth where it was determined to still be airworthy.

From Port Elizabeth to Johannesburg, the plane was marketed as Flight 406. Knowing he might need to bypass a landing in East London due to poor weather, Captain Lipawsky took on more fuel than would usually be loaded for the flight between Port Elizabeth and East London. He also made the passengers scheduled to disembark at East London aware that they may need to overfly the airport. One passenger stayed in Port Elizabeth to wait for a better chance to land, while another passenger decided to continue with the flight, and stay overnight in Johannesburg if needed. At 4:41 pm GMT, Flight 406 took off from Port Elizabeth, and at 4:58 GMT, a weather report for East London was given. Acknowledgement of receipt of the weather report was given a minute later, and the pilot further requested descent clearance from flight level 90 (about 9,000 feet), which was granted. Air traffic control at East London requested the pilot to radio when he passed 4,500 ft. The pilot was recorded at Port Elizabeth tower saying that he was descending through 4,000 ft, seaward of the coastline and about 20 miles away from landing at 5:06 pm GMT. The pilot was made aware that lights for both runways were on, but runway 10 was not available due to poor visibility. At 5:09 pm GMT (estimated), the pilot radioed to say he was at 2,000 ft and had the coast in sight. After this transmission, the plane was not heard from again.

== Investigation ==
The rescue attempt and later investigation were complicated by the plane crashing into the sea at night. The investigators were unable to recover the plane or the bodies of the passengers. The official investigation believed the plane was airworthy at the time it hit the water. Since the aircraft was airworthy, the investigation concluded the accident had two possible causes. The most likely cause was the pilot having a heart attack and the co-pilot being unable to recover the plane before it crashed. The original report admitted the accident could have occurred due to spatial disorientation of the pilot, but believed that this was unlikely due to the pilot's experience level.

Judge Cecil Margo, one of the original investigators, later stated in his memoir, Final Postponement, that he believed the plane crashed due to separation of the wing. At the time of the crash, Margo said that four Vickers Viscounts had been lost in crashes, two due to structural failure, and two over water with unknown cause. Margo continues saying that just after this crash, another Vickers Viscount was lost over the sea on its way to Ireland, and yet another was lost over land in Australia. The crash in Australia allowed investigators to find the cause of in-flight disintegration, a failed wing spar. Later on, Margo connected the dots with the other crashes at sea, and as of writing his memoirs, he believed that the Rietbok crash was due to a failed wing spar as well. Subsequently, both Australian Viscount crashes were found to be due to maintenance errors.

== Controversy ==
The crash of Rietbok happened during the Apartheid era in South Africa. In 1967, the Government of South Africa was increasingly aggressive in its actions against those who opposed the Apartheid government, as they had just banned the African National Congress (ANC) and Pan Africanist Congress (PAC). Two people who were known to criticise the Apartheid government were on the flight, Johannes Bruwer and Audrey Rosenthal. Bruwer was the acting chair of the powerful Afrikaner Broederbond, and was said to be deeply disillusioned with apartheid. Rosenthal was an American working with the Defence and Aid Fund, a group that helped jailed and exiled PAC and ANC members' families. Both people told family members or friends that they believed the security branch was investigating or following them. In 1998, Malcolm Viviers, a navy diver came forward with the story that the government had been successful in finding the wreck soon after the crash. He claimed to have seen passengers strapped into their seats in the plane via a video monitor on the SAS Johannesburg. Due to this new evidence, family members of the victims have petitioned the Minister of Transport to reopen the air incident investigation.
