= Chintsa =

Chintsa Cintsa
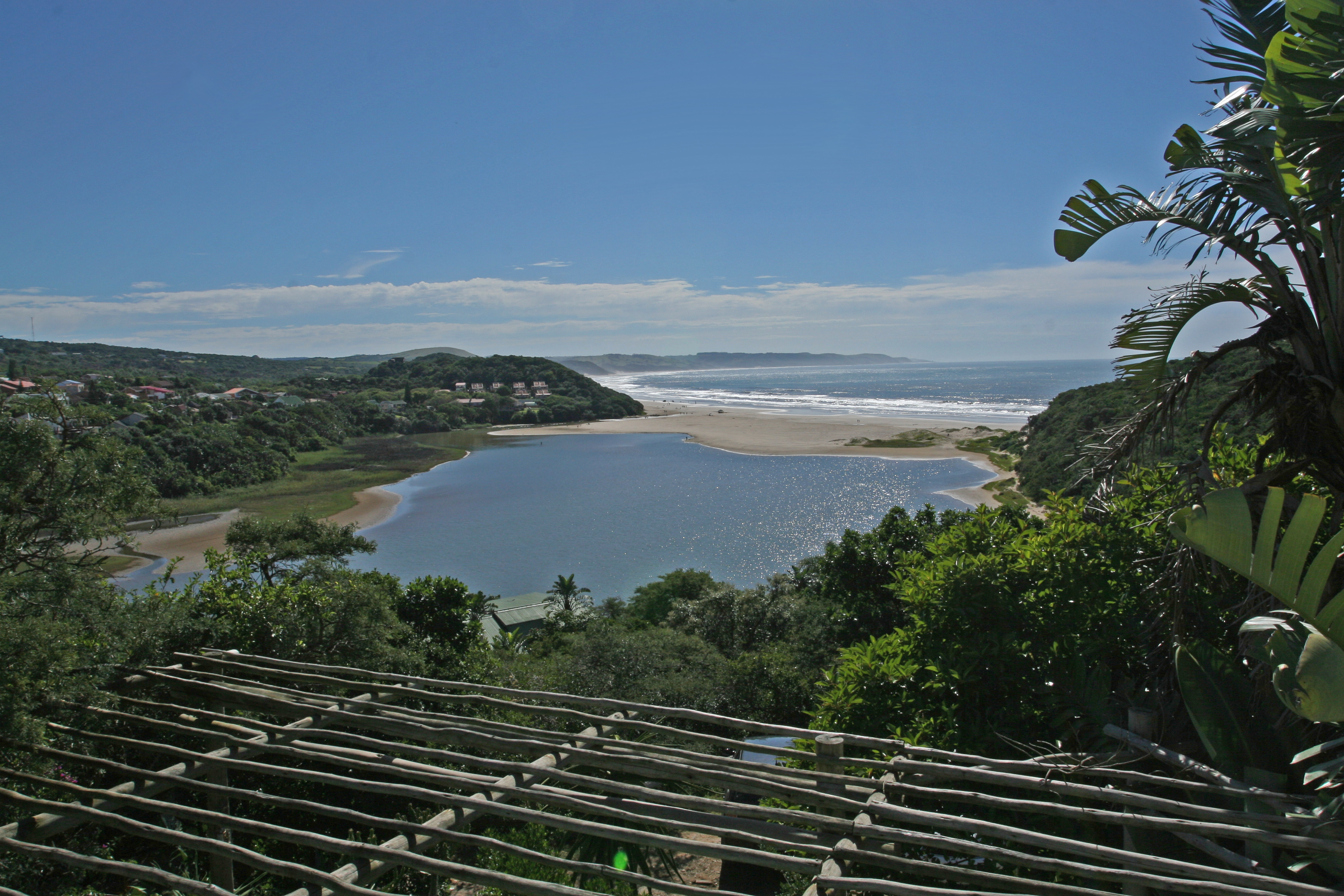
- Chintsa

- Location within Eastern Cape Location within South Africa Location within Africa
- Coordinates: 32°49′S 28°6′E
- Country: South Africa
- Province: Eastern Cape
- District: Amathole
- Municipality: Great Kei

Area
  - Total: 4.10 km^{2} (1.58 sq mi)

Population (2011)
  - Total: 1,740
  - Density: 424/km^{2} (1,100/sq mi)

Racial makeup (2011)
  - Black African: 83.8%
  - Coloured: 0.6%
  - Indian/Asian: 0.2%
  - White: 14.5%
  - Other: 0.9%

First languages (2011)
  - Xhosa: 81.4%
  - English: 12.1%
  - Afrikaans: 4.3%
  - Other: 2.3%
- Time zone: UTC+2 (SAST)

Chintsa (Xhosa for "crumbling banks"), alternatively rendered Cintsa, is a village in the Wild Coast region of the Eastern Cape province, South Africa. It is situated 38 km north-east of East London and 10 km north of Gonubie, at the mouth of the Chintsa River.

There are two resort areas catering to tourists interested in sea fishing to the east and west of the river.

The village is in Xhosa country. It has a laid-back atmosphere with low-cost accommodation and unspoilt white sand beaches in Chintsa East, backed by forested dunes, lagoons and rivers.
