= Operation Resolve =

Operation Resolve may refer to:

- The South African search for the wreckage of South African Airways Flight 295 in 1987–1988
- The police investigation into the 1989 Hillsborough disaster in the United Kingdom, which began in 2012
