= Walter Bunyan =

Anglican priest

Walter Frederick Bunyan was a 20th-century Anglican priest.

Bunyan was born in 1917 and educated at King's College, London. He was ordained deacon in 1941, and priest in 1942. After Curacies in Gillingham and Felixstowe he was Rector of Komga from 1946 to 1949. and then of Uitenhage until 1954. Returning to England he was Vicar of Woodside from 1954 to 1958. Back in South Africa he served in Port Elizabeth and was its Archdeacon from 1964 to 1968. He was the Vicar of Kingsbury from 1969 to 1974; Archdeacon of Kroonstad from 1974 to 1980; and Vicar of Carbis Bay from 1981.
