= Goburdhun =

Goburdhun is a surname. Notable people with the surname include:

- Hurrylall Goburdhun (1919–2019), Mauritian lawyer and judge
- Ramchundur Goburdhun (1911–1992), Mauritian diplomat
