= Quenera Nature Reserve =

Riverine protected area in the Eastern Cape

- Nearest city: East London, Eastern Cape
- Coordinates: 32°57′39″S 27°57′05″E
- Area: 80.79 ha (199.6 acres)
- Established: November 18, 1988; 37 years ago
- Administrator: Eastern Cape Parks
- Quenera Nature Reserve (Eastern Cape) Quenera Nature Reserve (South Africa)

The Quenera Nature Reserve is a protected area in the Wild Coast region of the Eastern Cape in South Africa. It is situated on the last bend of the Quenera River, covering the estuary before joining with the Amathole Marine Protected Area, and by extension, the Amathole Offshore Marine Protected Area.

== History ==
This 80.79 ha reserve was created in 1988 along with the Nahoon Nature Reserve for the conservation of the region's fauna and flora.

== See also ==
- List of protected areas of South Africa
