= Cape Henderson Nature Reserve =

Coastal forest reserve in South Africa

- Type: Nature reserve
- Location: Wild Coast Region, Eastern Cape, South Africa
- Nearest city: Haga Haga
- Coordinates: 32°47′13″S 28°09′25″E
- Area: 240 hectares (590 acres)
- Created: 23 December 1983
- Administered by: Eastern Cape Parks

The Cape Henderson Nature Reserve, part of the greater East London Coast Nature Reserve, is a coastal forest reserve in the Wild Coast region of the Eastern Cape, South Africa.

== History ==
The 240-hectare (590-acre) reserve was created in 1983 along with the Gulu Nature Reserve and Kwelera Nature Reserve for the conservation of the region's fauna and flora.

== See also ==
- List of protected areas of South Africa
