= Nahoon Nature Reserve =

Riverine nature reserve in the Eastern Cape

- Type: Nature Reserve
- Nearest city: East London, Eastern Cape
- Coordinates: 32°58′51″S 27°56′15″E
- Area: 33 ha
- Established: 18 November 1988; 36 years ago
- Administered by: Eastern Cape Parks
- Nahoon Nature Reserve (South Africa) Nahoon Nature Reserve (Eastern Cape)

The Nahoon Nature Reserve, part of the greater East London Coast Nature Reserve, is a nature reserve in the Wild Coast region of the Eastern Cape. The reserve is located on the northern bank of the Nahoon River estuary.

== History ==
This 33 ha reserve was established in 1988 along with the Quenera Nature Reserve for the conservation of the region's fauna and flora.

== See also ==
- List of protected areas of South Africa
