= Kwelera National Botanical Garden =

National botanical garden in the Eastern Cape

- Nearest city: Gonubie
- Coordinates: 32.9085°S 28.0661°E
- Area: 10.48 ha
- Designated: 25 July 2014; 11 years ago
- Administered by: Eastern Cape Parks and South African National Biodiversity Institute
- Kwelera National Botanical Garden (Eastern Cape)

The Kwelera National Botanical Garden is located at the Kwelera Nature Reserve on the Wild Coast of the Eastern Cape. It lies at the mouth of the Kwelera River. The garden is the 10th national botanical garden established in South Africa and the first in the Eastern Cape.

== History ==
In 1994, the 6.96 ha (17.2 acres) Kwelera Island Local Nature Reserve was established as a protected area at the mouth of the Kwelera River. It is found opposite the garden.

In 2014, 10.48 ha of farmland beside the Kwelera Nature Reserve was purchased by SANBI for the creation of the Kwelera National Botanical Garden. This land was added to the existing Kwelera Nature Reserve which will serve as the natural portion of the botanical garden. It would be jointly managed by SANBI and Eastern Cape Parks.

== See also ==
- List of protected areas of South Africa
