= Komga =

- Location within Eastern Cape Location within South Africa Location within Africa
- Coordinates: 32.577°S 27.888°E
- Country: South Africa
- Province: Eastern Cape
- District: Amathole
- Municipality: Great Kei

Area
  - Total: 10.47 km^{2} (4.04 sq mi)

Population (2011)
  - Total: 8,090
  - Density: 773/km^{2} (2,000/sq mi)

Racial makeup (2011)
  - Black African: 91.0%
  - Coloured: 4.7%
  - Indian/Asian: 0.2%
  - White: 3.7%
  - Other: 0.3%

First languages (2011)
  - Xhosa: 88.6%
  - Afrikaans: 5.0%
  - English: 4.4%
  - Other: 1.9%
- Time zone: UTC+2 (SAST)
- Postal code (street): 4950
- PO box: 4950
- Area code: 043

Komga is a town in Amathole District Municipality in the Eastern Cape province of South Africa.

It is located 64 kilometres (40 mi) north of KuGompo City and 55 kilometres (34 mi) east of Stutterheim. It was founded as a farming centre in 1877 on the site of a military camp established in 1854, and acquired municipal status in 1904. Of Khoekhoen origin, the name probably does not mean 'brown', as has been stated, but 'lots of clay', 'clayey'.

It is also home to one of the oldest schools in the Eastern Cape, Komga Junior, as well as St. Paul's Anglican Church which is a national heritage site.

== Demographics ==
Komga is a diverse town that includes a neighbouring township, the residents of which speak many languages. The most commonly spoken language is Xhosa, followed by Afrikaans and English.
