= Bridle Drift Dam Nature Reserve =

Nature reserve in the Eastern Cape, South Africa

- Interactive map of Bridle Drift Dam Nature Reserve
- Type: Nature Reserve
- Nearest city: East London, Eastern Cape, South Africa
- Coordinates: 32°59′24″S 27°43′41″E
- Area: 552.58 ha (1,365.5 acres)
- Established: 21 December 1973
- Administrator: Eastern Cape Parks

The Bridle Drift Dam Nature Reserve is a reserve on the Bridle Drift Dam in the Wild Coast region of the Eastern Cape, South Africa. The reserve lies on the southern bank of the Buffalo River next to the Fort Pato Nature Reserve.

== History ==
The 552.58-hectare (1,365.5-acre) reserve was created in 1973 for the conservation of the dams's fauna and flora.

== See also ==
- List of protected areas of South Africa
