= Chalumna River =

River in the Eastern Cape, South Africa

- Location of the Chalumna River mouth
- Native name: Tyolomnqa (Xhosa)

Location
- Country: South Africa
- Province: Eastern Cape Province

Physical characteristics
- Source
  - location: Eastern Cape
- Source confluence: Qugwala River (W); Mtyolo River (E)
- Mouth: Indian Ocean
  - location: Near Kayser's Beach
  - coordinates: 33°14′S 27°35′E
  - elevation: 0 m (0 ft)
- Length: 78 km (48 mi)
- Basin size: 441 km^{2} (170 sq mi)

The Chalumna River (Xhosa: Tyolomnqa) is a river in the Eastern Cape, South Africa. It is approximately 78 km long, forming at the confluence of two small rivers, the Qugwala in the West and the Mtyolo in the East. It empties into the Indian Ocean through an estuary near Kayser's Beach.

Its catchment area of 441 km^{2} makes it one of the smallest river basins on South Africa's eastern coast. Its tributaries are Nyatyora, Nxwashu, Quru and Mpintso on the left and Rode, Twecu and Tsaba on the right. Its mouth is located about 45 km south west of the Buffalo Estuary at East London. The African longfin eel (Anguilla mossambica) is common in its waters.

== History ==
It was near the mouth of this river in 1938 that Captain Hendrik Goosen trawled a catch of fish, one of which Marjorie Courtenay-Latimer preserved. This fish was later identified as a coelacanth species, which was previously thought to be long extinct and was at that point in time only known from the fossil record. After the discovery, the name of the Chalumna River became part of the scientific name of the species, Latimeria chalumnae.

Historically the Chalumna River formed the northern border of the former Ciskei shoreline until 27 April 1994 when all the Apartheid era political regions were reincorporated into South Africa.

== See also ==
- List of rivers of South Africa
- List of estuaries of South Africa
