= Mnquma Local Municipality =

Coordinates: 32°19′S 28°08′E

Mnquma
- Local municipality
- Seal

- Location in the Eastern Cape
- Country: South Africa
- Province: Eastern Cape
- District: Amathole
- Seat: Butterworth
- Wards: 32

Government
  - Type: Municipal council

Area
  - Total: 3,270 km^{2} (1,260 sq mi)

Population (2011)
  - Total: 252,390
  - Density: 77.2/km^{2} (200/sq mi)

Racial makeup (2011)
  - Black African: 99.4%
  - Coloured: 0.2%
  - Indian/Asian: 0.1%
  - White: 0.2%

First languages (2011)
  - Xhosa: 96.1%
  - English: 1.4%
  - Other: 2.5%
- Time zone: UTC+2 (SAST)
- Municipal code: EC122

Mnquma Municipality (Xhosa: uMasipala wase Mnquma) is a local municipality within the Amatole District Municipality, in the Eastern Cape of South Africa.

== Main places ==
The 2001 census divided the municipality into the following main places:

Place	Code	Area (km^{2})	Population
Amabhele	21101	526.95	32,672
Amahlubi	21102	631.51	42,651
Amambalu	21103	21.21	1,562
Amazizi	21104	623.87	54,406
Butterworth	21105	26.88	45,900
Fingo	21106	105.70	6,481
Gcaleka	21107	61.93	5,898
Gqogqora	21108	39.39	2,302
Imidushane	21109	64.07	4,239
Jalamba	21110	90.71	7,795
Centane Part 1	21111	4.44	784
Centane Part 2	21131	2.99	528
Kwebulana	21112	9.66	630
Lindinxiwa	21113	55.14	2,602
Mac Vigar	21114	134.74	6,410
Mazeppa Bay	21115	0.57	42
Mazizini	21116	43.39	2,040
Mnquma	21117	56.03	727
Mtoto	21118	52.88	4,260
Ngqwara	21119	193.31	14,912
Ngubezulu	21120	17.93	1,793
Ngusi	21121	114.11	7,347
Nqadu	21122	3.71	231
Nqamakwe	21123	16.09	1,405
Ntshatshongo	21124	0.72	0
Qolora Mouth	21126	0.34	69
Qolora	21125	201.39	20,265
Springs	21127	0.80	116
Teko	21128	61.74	5,686
Tutura	21129	47.50	5,664
Tyhali	21130	113.68	8,359

== Politics ==
The municipal council consists of sixty-three members elected by mixed-member proportional representation. Thirty-two councillors are elected by first-past-the-post voting in thirty-two wards, while the remaining thirty-one are chosen from party lists so that the total number of party representatives is proportional to the number of votes received.

In the election of 4 November 2026 the African National Congress (ANC) lost its majority but won a plurality of thirty seats.

The following table shows the results of the election.

Party	Ward			List			Total seats
Party	Votes	%	Seats	Votes	%	Seats	Total seats
African National Congress	25,631	46.15	24	27,088	48.56	6	30
Pan Africanist Congress of Azania	8,943	16.10	4	8,708	15.61	6	10
United Democratic Movement	6,111	11.00	2	6,827	12.24	5	7
South African Communist Party	4,076	7.34	2	3,800	6.81	2	4
Economic Freedom Fighters	3,602	6.49	0	3,398	6.09	4	4
African Transformation Movement	2,170	3.91	0	2,189	3.92	3	3
Democratic Alliance	1,432	2.58	0	1,369	2.45	2	2
African Independent Congress	994	1.79	0	436	0.78	1	1
Batho Pele Movement	707	1.27	0	651	1.17	1	1
uMkhonto weSizwe Party	513	0.92	0	467	0.84	1	1
Independent candidates	297	0.53	0				0
8 other parties	1,057	1.90	0	854	1.53	0	0
Total	55,533	100.00	32	55,787	100.00	31	63
Valid votes	55,533	97.92		55,787	98.30		
Invalid/blank votes	1,177	2.08		967	1.70		
Total votes	56,710	100.00		56,754	100.00		
Registered voters/turnout	124,301	45.62		124,301	45.66		
