= Gulu Nature Reserve =

Coastal forest reserve in the Eastern Cape

- Type: Nature reserve
- Location: Wild Coast Region, Eastern Cape, South Africa
- Nearest city: East London, Eastern Cape
- Coordinates: 33°06′47″S 27°44′10″E
- Area: 350 hectares (860 acres)
- Established: 23 December 1983
- Administered by: Eastern Cape Parks

The Gulu Nature Reserve, part of the greater East London Coast Nature Reserve, is a coastal forest reserve in the Wild Coast region of the Eastern Cape, South Africa. The reserve lies between the Gxulu River estuary, located on its western side, and the Igoda River estuary on the eastern side.

== History ==
The 350-hectare (860-acre) reserve was created in 1983 along with the Cape Henderson Nature Reserve and the Kwelera Nature Reserve for the conservation of the region's fauna and flora.

== See also ==
- List of protected areas of South Africa
