= Hurrylall Goburdhun =

Mauritian lawyer and judge (1919–2019)

Judge
- In office 1973–1992

Director, Rose Hill Transport
- In office 1992–2019

Personal details
- Born: 1919 Port Louis, British Mauritius
- Died: 15 September 2019 (aged 100) Mauritius

Hurrylall Goburdhun (1919 - 15 September 2019), also known as "Harry Goburdhun", was a lawyer and Judge of the Supreme Court of Mauritius. He was also a Director of the transportation firm Rose Hill Transport.

Following the on crash of the South African Airways Flight 295 on 27 November 1987 Judge Goburdhun formed part of the commission of enquiry which was presided by South African Judge Cecil Margo. The board of enquiry of the Margo Commission also included Tompkins (USA), Wilkinson (UK), Funatso (Japan), Lung (Taiwan), Gilliland and Germishuys (South Africa).
