= Fort Pato Nature Reserve =

Forest nature reserve in the Eastern Cape, South Africa

- Interactive map of Fort Pato Nature Reserve
- Type: Nature Reserve
- Nearest city: East London, Eastern Cape, South Africa
- Coordinates: 33°00′07″S 27°40′01″E
- Area: 673.35 ha (1,663.9 acres)
- Established: 6 July 1973
- Administrator: Eastern Cape Parks

The Fort Pato Nature Reserve is one of two inland forest reserves in the greater East London Coast Nature Reserve, located in the Wild Coast region of the Eastern Cape, South Africa. The reserve lies on the southern bank of the Buffalo River next to the Bridle Drift Dam Nature Reserve and down to the R346.

== History ==
This 673.35-hectare (1,663.9-acre) reserve was created in 1973 for the conservation of the region's fauna and flora.

== See also ==
- List of protected areas of South Africa
