= Qolora Mouth =

- Location within Eastern Cape Location within South Africa
- Coordinates: 32.639°S 28.426°E
- Country: South Africa
- Province: Eastern Cape
- District: Amathole
- Municipality: Mnquma

Area
  - Total: 1.31 km^{2} (0.51 sq mi)

Population (2011)
  - Total: 137
  - Density: 105/km^{2} (271/sq mi)

Racial makeup (2011)
  - Black African: 76.6%
  - Coloured: 2.2%
  - White: 21.2%

First languages (2011)
  - Xhosa: 75.4%
  - English: 14.8%
  - Zulu: 8.2%
  - Sign language: 1.6%
- Time zone: UTC+2 (SAST)

Qolora Mouth is a town in Amathole District Municipality in the Eastern Cape province of South Africa.

A small resort at the mouth of the Qolora River, it is located in the vicinity of the pool of Nongqawuse, the Xhosa prophetess, and the wreck of the Jacaranda, which foundered on 18 September 1971 on the rocks off the coast.
