= Great Kei Local Municipality =

Coordinates: 32°35′30″S 27°53′02″E

Great Kei
- Local municipality
- Seal

- Location in the Eastern Cape
- Country: South Africa
- Province: Eastern Cape
- District: Amathole
- Seat: Qumrha
- Wards: 7

Government
  - Type: Municipal council
  - Mayor: Ngenisile Wellington Tekile (ANC)
  - Speaker: Ngenisile Wellington Tekile (ANC)
  - Chief Whip: Ndileka Kantshashe (ANC)

Area
  - Total: 1,736 km^{2} (670 sq mi)

Population (2011)
  - Total: 38,991
  - Density: 22.46/km^{2} (58.17/sq mi)

Racial makeup (2011)
  - Black African: 91.3%
  - Coloured: 1.3%
  - Indian/Asian: 0.1%
  - White: 7.1%

First languages (2011)
  - Xhosa: 88.8%
  - English: 7.0%
  - Afrikaans: 2.7%
  - Other: 1.5%
- Time zone: UTC+2 (SAST)
- Municipal code: EC123

Great Kei Municipality (Xhosa: uMasipala wase Great Kei) is a local municipality within the Amathole District Municipality, in the Eastern Cape province of South Africa. The word Kei is of Khoikhoi origin, meaning "great/big". The municipality is named after the Great Kei River.

== Main places ==
The 2001 census divided the municipality into the following main places:

Place	Code	Area (km^{2})	Population
Chintsa East	21202	3.80	1,317
Chintsa	21201	2.57	423
Cwili	21203	0.51	1,473
Haga Haga	21205	1.20	114
Kei Mouth	21206	3.20	284
Qumrha	21207	5.32	1,267
Kwelerha Point	21209	0.36	96
Kwelerha	21208	50.83	8,941
Mooiplaas	21210	145.07	17,281
Morgans Bay	21211	1.36	453
Ocean View	21212	0.17	67
Qumrha	21213	1.94	5,652
Remainder of the municipality	21204	1,519.30	7,087

== Politics ==
The municipal council consists of thirteen members elected by mixed-member proportional representation. Seven councillors are elected by first-past-the-post voting in seven wards, while the remaining six are chosen from party lists so that the total number of party representatives is proportional to the number of votes received.

In the election of 4 November 2026 the African National Congress (ANC) won a majority of seven seats.

The following table shows the results of the election.

Party	Ward			List			Total seats
Party	Votes	%	Seats	Votes	%	Seats	Total seats
African National Congress	6,000	47.00	6	6,225	49.67	1	7
Great Kei Community Movement	2,109	16.52	0	2,154	17.19	2	2
Democratic Alliance	2,089	16.37	1	2,093	16.70	1	2
Economic Freedom Fighters	711	5.57	0	856	6.83	1	1
South African Communist Party	604	4.73	0	596	4.76	1	1
Independent candidates	738	5.78	0				0
7 other parties	514	4.03	0	608	4.85	0	0
Total	12,765	100.00	7	12,532	100.00	6	13
Valid votes	12,765	97.64		12,532	95.85		
Invalid/blank votes	309	2.36		542	4.15		
Total votes	13,074	100.00		13,074	100.00		
Registered voters/turnout	20,818	62.80		20,818	62.80		
