= Morgan Bay =

Morgan Bay af: Morganbaai
- Gxarha
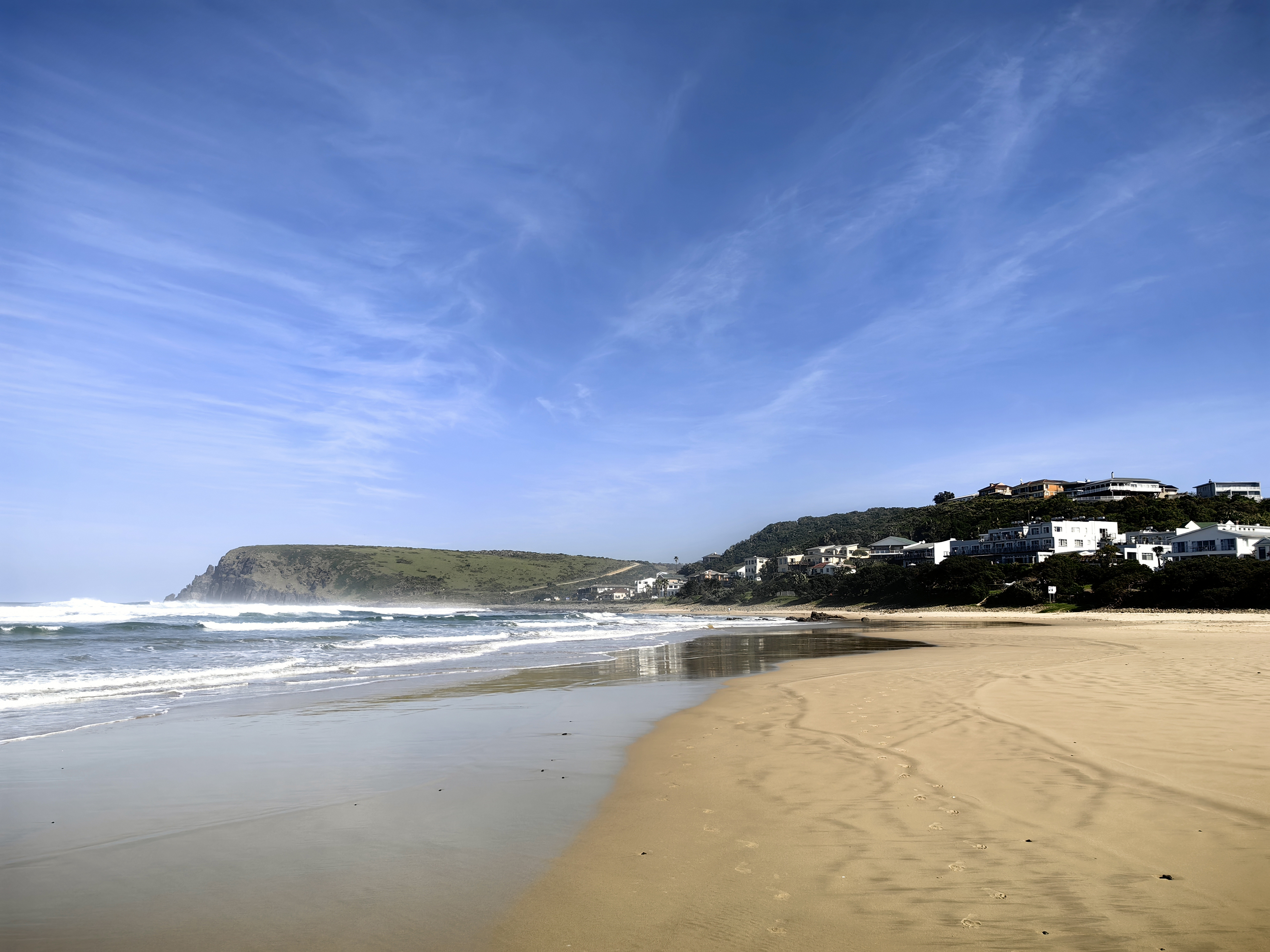
- Morgan Bay

- Location within Eastern Cape Location within South Africa Location within Africa
- Coordinates: 32.704°S 28.336°E
- Country: South Africa
- Province: Eastern Cape
- District: Amathole
- Municipality: Great Kei

Area
  - Total: 1.36 km^{2} (0.53 sq mi)

Population (2011)
  - Total: 321
  - Density: 236/km^{2} (611/sq mi)

Racial makeup (2011)
  - Black African: 47.5%
  - Coloured: 0.6%
  - Indian/Asian: 0.6%
  - White: 47.2%
  - Other: 4.1%

First languages (2011)
  - Xhosa: 47.9%
  - English: 40.7%
  - Afrikaans: 9.5%
  - Other: 1.9%
- Time zone: UTC+2 (SAST)
- Postal code (street): 5292
- PO box: n/a

Morgan Bay, officially renamed Gxarha in 2022, is a village in Amathole District Municipality in the Eastern Cape province of South Africa.

The holiday village of Morgan Bay was given its current name in 1822. It was named after A.F. Morgan, the master of the Barracouta, a survey ship of the Royal Navy. The ship was part of an expedition under Captain William Fitzwilliam Owen, sent out by the British Admiralty to survey the coast from Maputo to the mouth of the Keiskamma River. The nearby Bead Beach (Treasure Beach) at the Double Mouth Nature Reserve is the site of a 16th-century Portuguese shipwreck.

== Tourism ==
Morgan Bay is a popular holiday destination due to its picturesque setting, mile-long beach, estuary, sea cliffs and location at the southern end of the Wild Coast.

The 1.6 km-long (0.99 mi) sandy beach is patrolled by lifeguards during the festive season and is ideal for ball games such as cricket, rugby and tennis. A set of touch rugby and cricket tournaments are held between Christmas and New Year every year. The dunes are good for sandboarding and the beach is also popular with joggers and walkers.

The shallow Inchara river estuary, which hosts numerous water birds, is ideal for swimming and water sports like canoeing, board sailing and standup paddle boarding.

The Morgan Bay cliffs are popular with hikers and offer excellent vantage points for watching the sunrise or enjoying a sundowner with friends. The Morgan Bay cliffs is the largest sea cliff climbing location in South Africa with over 600 climbing routes and several bouldering problems.

The Morganville Motorcycle Museum which is located just 7 km (4.3 mi) from town, houses over 650 motorcycles, a Convair 880 passenger jet, several London buses and many other collectables. Owned and run by the former Eastern Cape Finance MEC, Billy Nel, the museum is opened to the public on the occasional open-day, which he holds for local charities, as well visiting motorcycle clubs during rallies.

Other activities in Morgan Bay include bird watching, hiking, mountain biking, township tours, fishing, surfing, game drives and horse riding.

The Cape Morgan Nature Reserve is a coastal forest reserve found between the Morgan Bay estuary and the Cwili estuary. The Strandloper Hiking Trail begins at the visitor centre found on the reserve.

== Gallery ==
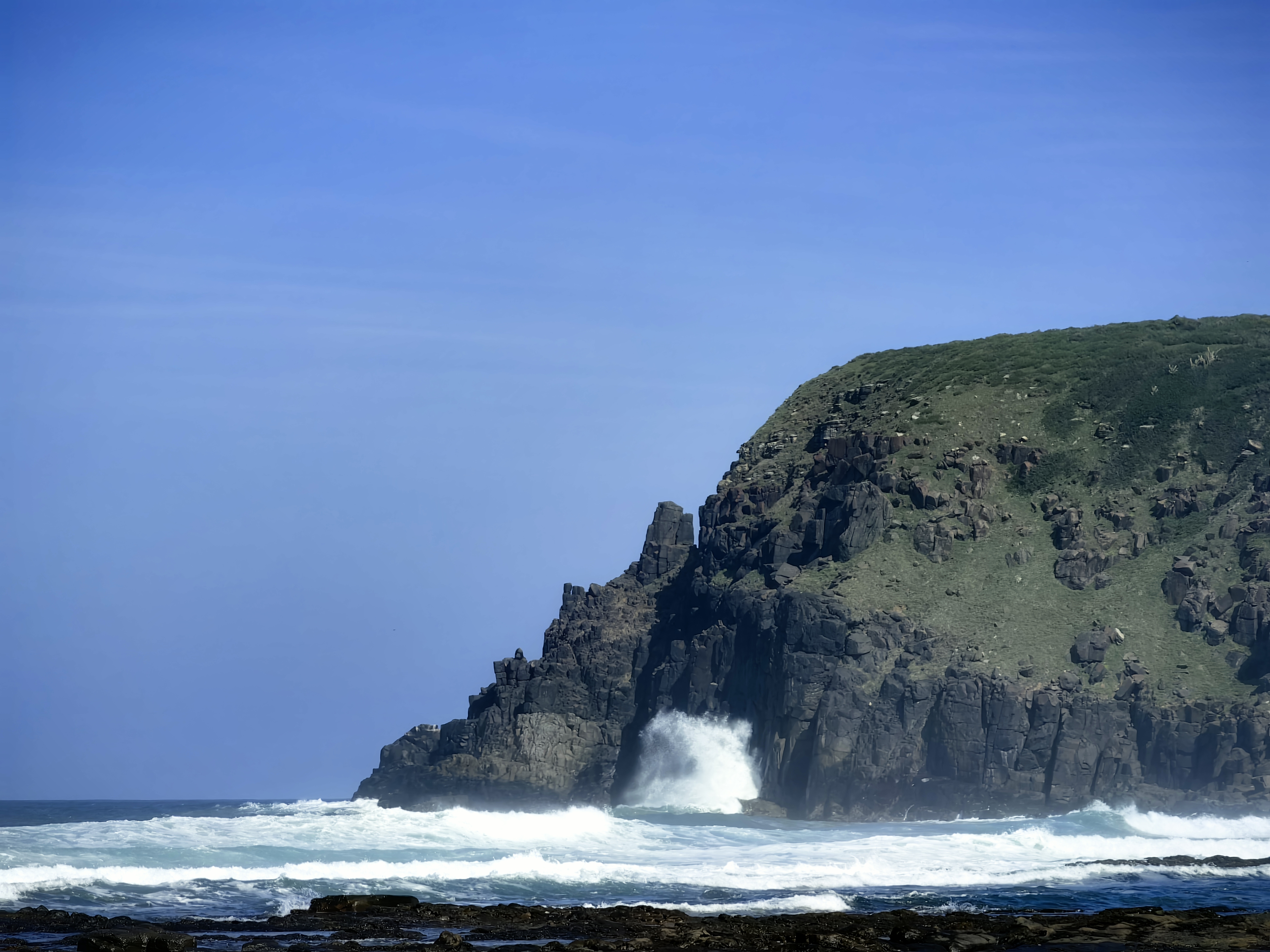
Keightly's Krantz in Morgan Bay

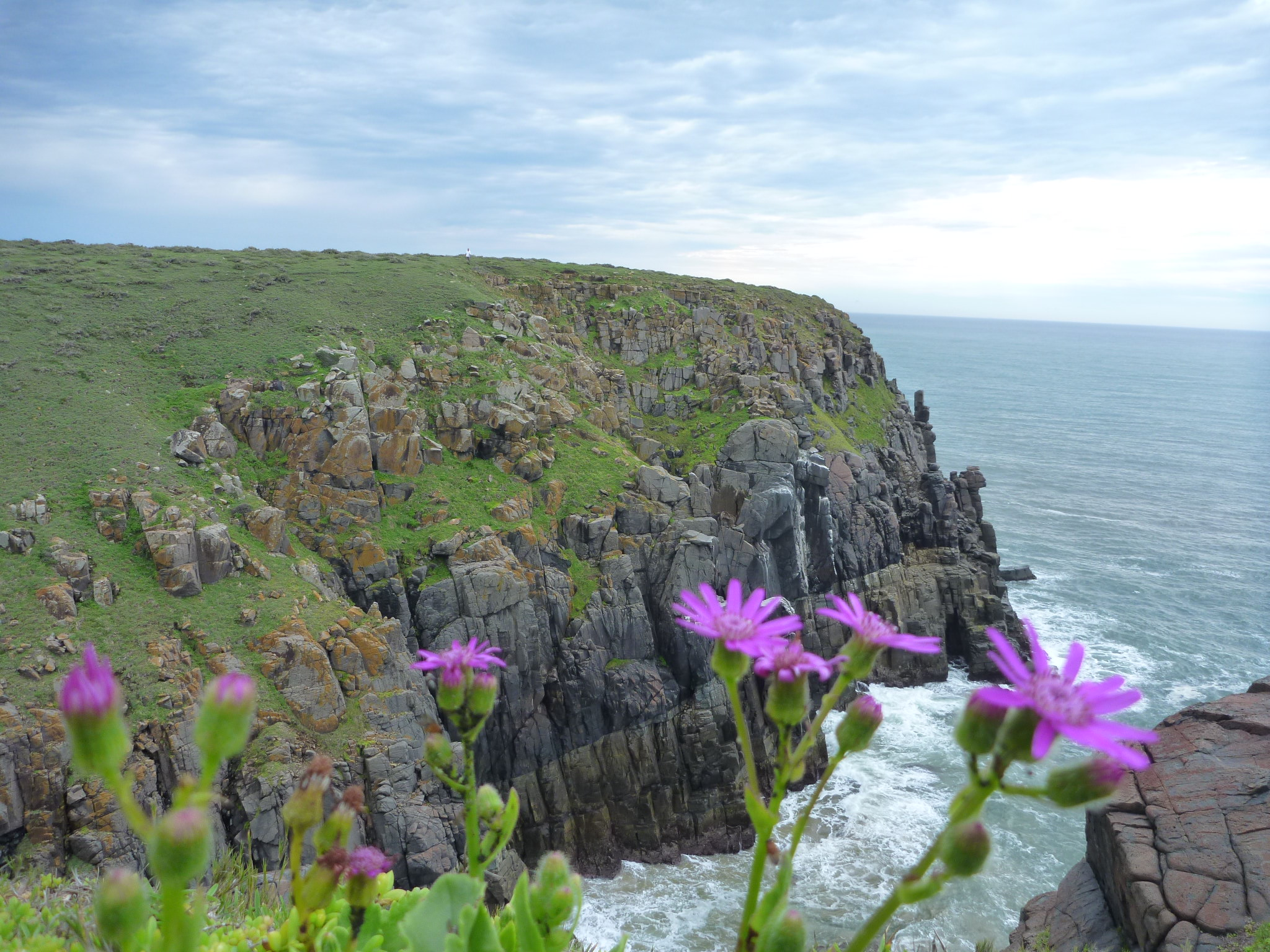
Morgan Bay cliffs

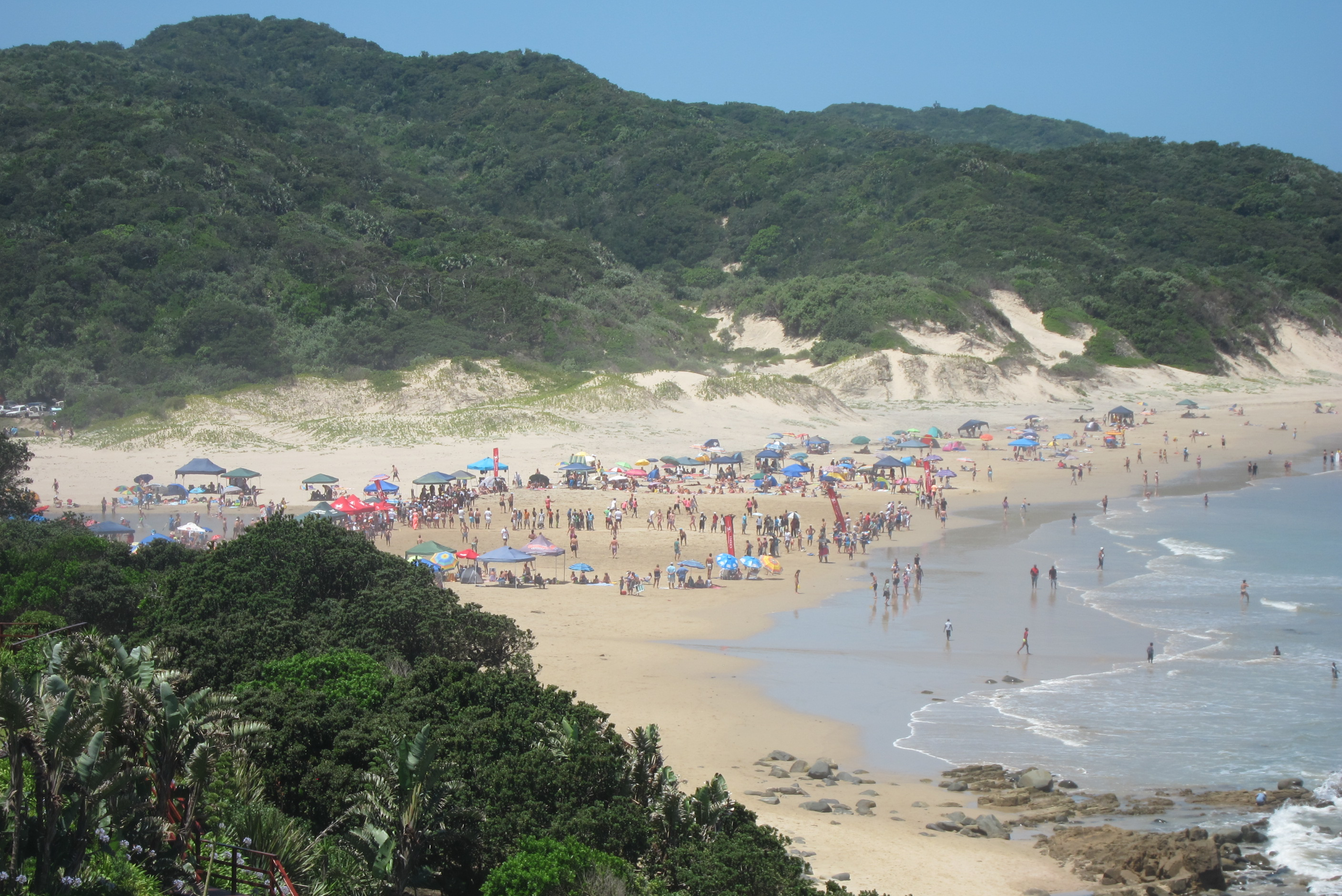
Morgan Bay beach and touch rugby competition
