= Ming presentation porcelain =

Historic Chinese pottery

Reverse view

Ming presentation porcelain was a variety of high quality Chinese porcelain items included among the gifts exchanged in foreign relations during the Ming Dynasty. Among the great number and variety of Chinese ceramics found in Thailand and greater Southeast Asia is a variety that closely resembles Ming official ware in its use of dragon and phoenix motifs and high quality materials with workmanship.

The scholar Liu Liangyou in an article entitled “Chinese Ceramics Excavated in Thailand” in the 49th issue of the National Palace Museum Monthly of Chinese Art, suggested that such finely executed ceramics could only be products of an official workshop and part of the gift system in place for Ming Dynasty foreign relations. Liang quotes the Ming Dynastic History (Mingshi) 339th chapter for Champa and Cambodia (Zhancheng Zhenla zhuan) for the year 1383. The Ming court presented Siam (Thailand) nineteen thousand items of ceramic ware. Three years later it is also noted that the court presented Cambodia with an unspecified quantity of ceramic items. We can assume that the number of items was significant also and the time period for such exchanged continued at least through the early Ming dynastic period.

The blue-and-white phoenix dish reproduced here, and discovered in Southeast Asia, is identical to the example in the Boston Museum of Fine Arts, dated mid 15th century.

== Xuande mark and period ==
Within all periods of the Ming Dynasty, the Xuande mark and period (1426-35) is often considered to be one of the most sophisticated periods in the history of Chinese Blue and White porcelain crafts.
