= Cecil Margo =

South African judge

Cecil Margo DSO DFC, QC, FRAeS
- Born: July 10, 1915; Johannesburg, Transvaal, Union of South Africa
- Died: November 19, 2000 (aged 85); Johannesburg, Gauteng, South Africa
- Occupations: World War II pilot, Supreme Court Justice
- Spouse: Marguerite Gisele Margo
- Children: 3

Cecil Stanley Margo DSO DFC, QC, FRAeS (10 July 1915 – 19 November 2000) was an Allied World War II hero. Margo was also a South African Supreme Court Justice who oversaw a number of international air-crash investigations, including into the crash of South African Airways Flight 295.

== Family ==
Cecil Margo was the fifth child of Saul Lewis Margo and Amelia Hilson, South African immigrants of Eastern European Jewish descent.

== Military career ==
During World War II, Margo assumed command of 24 Bomber Squadron, flying over 190 strike missions by day and night against the enemy in North Africa, the Middle East and Europe. Margo was awarded two of the most prestigious British Commonwealth medals - the Distinguished Service Order (DSO) presented to him personally by King George VI, and the Distinguished Flying Cross (DFC). The Mail & Guardian, 26 February, 1999. "In the annals of wartime bomber command, Margo's name remains of legend." (Ibid.). Operational flying was perilous for bomber crews in World War II - according to the Imperial War Museum 51% of bomber crews were killed in action and only 24% survived the war unscathed. This was the highest attrition rate of any Allied unit during World War II. Despite the risks, Margo volunteered for multiple tours of operations - far more than required. At the end of the war, Margo was chosen to lead the victory fly-past of the Royal Air Forces, and the U.S. Army Air Forces over Austria.

== Post War and Israel ==
In 1948, Margo had started a flourishing career as a trial lawyer aided by his record as a war hero. One day, he returned to his chambers from court and found an urgent telegram from David Ben-Gurion. Ben Gurion asked Margo to come out to Israel to serve as Ben Gurion's chief advisor on the establishment and organization of the Israeli Air Force.

Though Cecil Margo had been in combat for years as a pilot in World War II and now had a wife and small child, he later wrote in his memoirs that he felt he had to go. The newly declared State of Israel had been attacked by the armies of five Arab countries and its prospects for survival were dim. Ben Gurion, who knew that air power would be critical to Israel's immediate and long range survival, had heard of Margo from his commanders such as Yaakov Dori and Chaim Laskov. Margo's effectiveness as a squadron commander, his expertise in air warfare in both the Desert and Europe during World War II, and his experience of high-level command in the Royal Air Force as Operations Staff Officer, Advanced Air HQ, Desert Air Force, made Israel request his assistance.

When Margo arrived in Israel, he assessed the issues and needs of the fledgling Israeli Air Force and "threw himself into the problems of personnel, equipment, aerodromes, armaments, maintenance, training, operations, logistics and strategies. He hammered out plans for a small but efficient and powerful air force." Margo's plans became the foundation on which the modern-day Israeli Air Force was built. Ben Gurion, who developed an admiration and fondness for Margo, asked him to remain in Israel as commander of the Israeli Air Force with the rank of "Aluf" Major General. But Margo declined, preferring to return to the Union of South Africa to resume his legal practice. Upon returning to South Africa, he participated in formulating and monitoring the Advanced Pilots Training Course in Germiston, where South Africans were trained as pilots for the Israeli Air Force. He remained a staunch supporter of Israel through the years, often returning and visiting Air Force bases.

== Appointment to the Supreme Court of South Africa ==
His assignment in Israel completed, Margo returned to the Johannesburg Bar and began legal practice. In 1959, he took silk and became a Queen's Counsel. In 1971, Margo was appointed to the bench as a Justice of the Supreme Court of South Africa. Soon after his appointment, Margo issued a landmark interdict against South Africa's notorious security police to protect the life of anti-apartheid activist Salim Essop.

As a Justice, Margo also chaired commissions that reformed South Africa's tax, corporate and securities laws, as well as its aviation system.

=== Aircraft accident investigations and death ===
Margo participated and led investigations into major air crashes. He was appointed to investigate the following high-profile air disasters:

- the DC-6 accident, on September 18, 1961 near Ndola in what was the Central African Federation, and in which the then Secretary General of the United Nations, Dag Hammarskjöld was killed;
- the loss of the Rietbok, an SAA Viscount airliner, which crashed into the sea off East London in 1967;
- the crash of the Pretoria, an SAA Boeing 707 which crashed after take-off from Windhoek, South West Africa in 1968;
- the Tupolev Tu-134 air disaster in 1986 just inside South African territory, which killed Samora Machel, the then President of Mozambique, and 34 others;
- the Helderberg air disaster of 1987 which claimed 159 lives when an SAA Boeing 747-200, the Helderberg, crashed into the sea north-east of Mauritius.

While the Margo Commission could not determine a definite cause of the fire in the cargo hold that caused the Helderberg disaster, its findings resulted in changes that have reduced the risks of fires on international airliners and enhanced safety of aircraft that carry both passengers and cargo. Rumours about a cover-up of the cause of the Helderberg crash abounded for years - including the suggestion that the fire was caused by illicit cargo of rocket fuel and ammunition. But the credibility of the Margo Commission and its international panel of experts, including Astronaut and Eastern Airlines CEO Frank Borman, suggested otherwise. So did the fact that Margo insisted that the Helderberg's cockpit voice recorder be recovered from the wreckage, which lay on the ocean floor at a depth greater than that of the Titanic. Years later, South Africa's Truth and Reconciliation Commission extensively investigated the findings of the Margo Commission and found that there was no evidence to justify repudiating the findings.

Cecil Margo received numerous awards during his lifetime and was an honorary fellow of the South African Institute of Mechanical Engineers; Honorary Deputy President of the International Association of Jewish Lawyers and Jurists; Honorary Fellow of the Hebrew University of Jerusalem and a Fellow Of The Royal Aeronautical Society in London. He continued flying until his late 70's and died in 2000. He is survived by three sons from his marriage to Marguerite Gisele Margo and four grandchildren. He was remarried to Marjorie Margo, who died in Sydney, Australia.

== Controversies ==
Margo was criticised for discrediting testimonies of black witnesses during the investigation into the 1961 Ndola United Nations DC-6 Crash that killed Dag Hammarskjöld. Charcoal burners of the township of Twapia testified that they saw a second plane in the air, but were considered unreliable. Board secretary of Twapia, Timothy Kankasa, testified to Margo that he alerted the Rhodesian authorities of the location of the wreck, six hours before the wreck was found. This testimony was "ridiculed" by Margo.
