= Doornkop Fish and Wildlife Reserve =

Park in Carolina, USA

Coordinates: 25.929485°S 30.240115°E

Doornkop Fish and Wildlife Reserve is a nature reserve and game park located near Carolina, Mpumalanga, 3 hours from Johannesburg and 2.5 hours from Pretoria.

Activities in the reserve include fly fishing, walks, birding, tennis, game viewing swimming pool, games room and horse riding.
