= South African Airways Flight 295 =

1987 aviation accident in the Indian Ocean

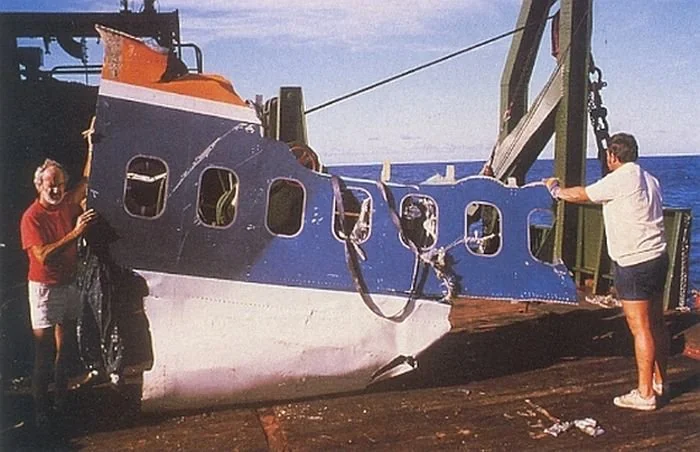
- A piece of aircraft fuselage recovered from the Indian Ocean

Accident
- Date: 28 November 1987
- Summary: In-flight fire in cargo hold leading to loss of control and in-flight breakup
- Site: Indian Ocean, 248 kilometres (134 NM) northeast of Plaisance Airport, Mauritius.; 19°10′30″S 59°38′0″E

Aircraft
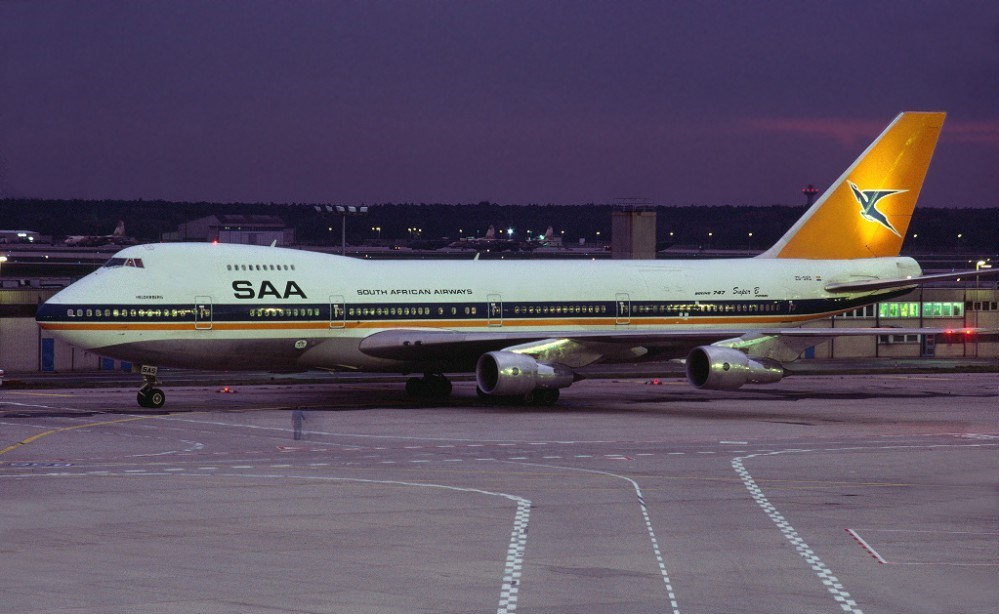
- ZS-SAS, the aircraft involved in the accident, pictured in 1983
- Aircraft type: Boeing 747-244BM Combi
- Aircraft name: Helderberg
- Operator: South African Airways
- IATA flight No.: SA295
- ICAO flight No.: SAA295
- Call sign: SPRINGBOK 295
- Registration: ZS-SAS
- Flight origin: Chiang Kai-shek International Airport, Taipei, Taiwan
- Stopover: Plaisance Airport, Plaine Magnien, Mauritius
- Destination: Jan Smuts International Airport, Johannesburg, South Africa
- Occupants: 159
- Passengers: 140
- Crew: 19
- Fatalities: 159
- Survivors: 0

South African Airways Flight 295, sometimes referenced and known as the Helderberg disaster, was a scheduled international passenger flight from Chiang Kai-shek International Airport, Taipei, Taiwan, to Jan Smuts International Airport, Johannesburg, South Africa, with a stopover in Plaisance Airport, Plaine Magnien, Mauritius. On November 28, 1987, the aircraft serving the flight, a Boeing 747 named Helderberg, experienced a catastrophic in-flight fire in the cargo area, broke up in mid-air, and crashed into the Indian Ocean east of Mauritius, killing all 159 passengers and crew on board while it was around half an hour away from landing into Mauritius . An extensive salvage operation was mounted to try to recover the aircraft's flight recorders, one of which was recovered from a depth of 16,100 feet (4,900 m).

The official inquiry, headed by Judge Cecil Stanley Margo, was unable to determine the cause of the fire. This lack of a conclusion led to theories, debates, and speculation about the nature of Flight 295's cargo, as well as a subsequent post-apartheid investigation and calls from relatives of those on the flight to re-open the investigation in the years following the accident. Following the accident, South African Airways (SAA) stopped using the Combi version of the Boeing 747 due to safety concerns about the main deck cargo compartment.

== Aircraft and crew ==
The aircraft involved was a 7-year-old Boeing 747-244BM Combi registered ZS-SAS and named Helderberg. This was the 488th 747 built, made its first flight on 12 November 1980 and was delivered to SAA on 24 November 1980.

The Boeing 747-200B Combi model permits the mixing of passengers and cargo on the main deck according to load factors on any given route and Class B cargo compartment regulations.

Flight 295 had 140 passengers and six pallets of cargo on the main deck. The master waybills stated that 47,000 kilograms (104,000 lb) of baggage and cargo were loaded on the aircraft. A Taiwanese customs official performed a surprise inspection of some of the cargo; he did not find anything that could be characterised as suspicious. According to Tinus Jacobs who was SAA's manager in Taiwan at the time of Flight 295, the flight crew appeared relaxed and "happy to fly" before takeoff and did not display any concerns about the cargo.

The captain of Flight 295 was 49-year-old Dawid Jacobus Uys, a former South African Air Force pilot with 13,843 hours' experience of which 3,884 hours was on the Boeing 747 series airplanes. Uys was described by colleagues as having a professional, skilled and friendly personality, and at the time of the accident was considering retiring to take up a role with the South African Pilots' Association. The flight crew also consisted of 36-year-old first officer David Attwell and 37-year-old relief first officer Geoffrey Birchall, with 7,362 and 8,749 hours' experience (including 4,096 and 4,555 hours on the Boeing 747) respectively; and 45-year-old flight engineer, Giuseppe "Joe" Bellagarda and 34-year-old relief flight engineer, Alan Daniel, with 7,804 hours and 1,595 hours (4,254 and 227 of them on the Boeing 747) of experience respectively.

== Accident ==
Flight 295 took off at 14:23 UTC (22:23 local time) on 27 November 1987 from Chiang Kai Shek International Airport near Taipei on a flight to Johannesburg via Mauritius.

Thirty-four minutes after departure, the crew contacted Hong Kong air traffic control to obtain clearance from waypoint ELATO (22°19′N 117°30′E) to ISBAN. A position report was made over ELATO at 15:03:25, followed by waypoints SUNEK at 15:53:52, ADMARK at 16:09:54 and SUKAR (12°22′N 110°54′E) at 16:34:47. The aircraft made a routine report to the SAA base at Johannesburg at 15:55:18.

At some point during the flight, believed to be during the beginning of its landing approach to Mauritius, a fire started in the cargo section on the main deck which was probably not extinguished before impact. The 'smoke evacuation' checklist calls for the aircraft to be depressurized, and for two of the cabin doors to be opened. No direct evidence exists that the checklist was followed or that the doors were opened; however, Air Traffic Control communications and the cockpit voice recording suggest either one or both actions may have taken place. A crew member may have also gone into the cargo hold to try to fight the fire. A charred fire extinguisher was later recovered from the wreckage on which investigators found molten metal and melted cargo netting.

The following communication was recorded with Mauritius air traffic control, located at Plaisance Airport near Port Louis:

Transcript of communication with Mauritius air traffic control
Time	Speaker	Dialog	Comment from official inquiry
23:48:51	295	Eh, Mauritius, Mauritius, Springbok Two Niner Five.	
23:49:00	ATC	Springbok Two Nine Five, eh, Mauritius, eh, good morning, eh, go ahead.	
23:49:07	295	Eh, good morning, we have, eh, a smoke, eh, eh, problems and we're doing emergency descent to level one five (in error), eh, one four zero. (flight level 140 is 14,000 feet)	
23:49:18	ATC	Confirm you wish to descend to flight level one four zero.	
23:49:20	295	Ja, we have already commenced, an, due to [a] smoke problem in the aeroplane.	Ja means yes in Afrikaans
23:49:25	ATC	Eh, roger, you are clear to descend immediately to flight level one four zero.	
23:49:30	295	Roger, we will appreciate if you can alert the fire, ehp, ehp eh (inhale) eh	
23:49:40	ATC	Do you wish to eh, do you request a full emergency?	
23:49:48	295	Okay Joe, kan jy...vir ons	[in Afrikaans] can you...for us
23:49:51	ATC	Springbok Two Nine Five, Plaisance.	
23:49:54	295	Sorry, go ahead?	
23:49:56	ATC	Do you, eh, request a full emergency please, a full emergency?	
23:50:00	295	Affirmative, that's Charlie Charlie.	
23:50:02	ATC	Roger, you declare a full emergency, roger.	
23:50:04	295	Thank you.	
23:50:40	ATC	Springbok Two Nine Five, Plaisance.	
23:50:44	295	Eh, go ahead.	
23:50:46	ATC	Request your actual position please and your DME distance?	
23:50:51	295	Eh, we haven't got the DME yet.	
23:50:55	ATC	Eh, roger and your actual position please.	
23:51:00	295	Eh, say again.	
23:51:02	ATC	Your actual position.	
23:51:08	295	Now we've lost a lot of electrics, we haven't got anything on the, on the aircraft now.	
23:51:12	ATC	Eh, roger, I declare a full emergency immediately.	
23:51:15	295	Affirmative.	
23:51:18	ATC	Roger.	
23:52:19	ATC	Eh, Springbok Two Nine Five, do you have an Echo Tango Alfa Plaisance please?	
23:52:30	ATC	Springbok Two Nine Five, Plaisance.	
23:52:32	295	Ja, Plaisance?	
23:52:33	ATC	Do you have an Echo Tango Alfa Plaisance please?	
23:52:36	295	Ja, eh, zero zero, eh eh eh three zero.	
23:52:40	ATC	Roger, zero zero three zero, thank you.	
23:52:50	295	Hey Joe, shut down the oxygen left.	Inadvertent transmission from the aircraft
23:52:52	ATC	Sorry, say again please?	
00:01:34	295	Eh, Plaisance, Springbok 295, we've opened the door[s] to see if we (can?)...we should be OK	
00:01:36	295	Look there (?)	Exclamation by someone else, and is said over the last part of the previous sentence
00:01:45	295	Donnerse deur t...	[in Afrikaans] Close the bloody door (More directly translated: Damned door c...)
00:01:57	295	Joe, switch up quickly, then close the hole on your side.	
00:02:10	295	Pressure(?) twelve thousand	
00:02:14	295	...Genoeg is...Anders kan ons vlug verongeluk	[in Afrikaans] ...Is enough...otherwise our flight could come to grief (More directly translated: ...enough is... otherwise our flight might crash)
00:02:25	295	(Carrier wave only)	
00:02:38	295	Eh Plaisance, Springbok Two Nine Five, do [did] you copy?	
00:02:41	ATC	Eh negative, Two Nine Five, say again please, say again.	
00:02:43	295	We're now sixty five miles.	
00:02:45	ATC	Confirm sixty five miles.	Incorrectly understood by air traffic control to mean that the aircraft was 65 miles from the airport; in fact it was 65 miles from waypoint XAGAL, and 145 miles from the airport.
00:02:47	295	Ja, affirmative Charlie Charlie.	
00:02:50	ATC	Eh, Roger, Springbok eh Two Nine Five, eh re you're recleared flight level five zero. Recleared flight level five zero.	
00:02:58	295	Roger, five zero.	
00:03:00	ATC	And, Springbok Two Nine Five copy actual weather Plaisance Copy actual weather Plaisance. The wind one one zero degrees zero five knots. The visibility above one zero kilometres. And we have a precipitation in sight to the north. Clouds, five oktas one six zero zero, one okta five thousand feet. Temperature is twenty two, two two. And the QNH one zero one eight hectopascals, one zero one eight over.	
00:03:28	295	Roger, one zero one eight.	
00:03:31	ATC	Affirmative, eh and both runways available if you wish.	
00:03:43	ATC	And two nine five, I request pilot's intention.	
00:03:46	295	Eh, we'd like to track in eh, on eh one three.	
00:03:51	ATC	Confirm runway one four.	
00:03:54	295	Charlie Charlie	
00:03:56	ATC	Affirmative and you're cleared, eh direct to Foxtrot Foxtrot. You report approaching five zero	Clearance granted to the Flic-en-Flac non-directional navigation beacon.
00:04:02	295	Kay	Last transmission from the aircraft
00:08:00	ATC	Two Nine Five, Plaisance	
00:08:11	ATC	Springbok Two Nine Five, Plaisance	
00:08:35	ATC	Springbok Two Nine Five Plaisance	No answer

The fire began to destroy the aircraft's important electrical systems, resulting in loss of communication and control of the aircraft. At exactly 00:07 UTC (4:07 local time), the aircraft broke apart mid-air, the tail section breaking off first when the fire began to burn the structure of the aircraft, and crashed into the Indian Ocean, about 134 nautical miles (154 mi; 248 km) from the airport. Other theories given for the ultimate demise of the aircraft were that the flight crew eventually became incapacitated by the smoke and fire or extensive damage to the 747's control systems rendered the plane uncontrollable before it hit the ocean.

After communication with Flight 295 was lost for thirty-six minutes, at 00:44 (04:44 local time), air traffic control at Plaisance Airport formally declared an emergency. All 140 passengers and 19 crew members aboard died in the crash.

== Search and salvage ==
Map of the Indian Ocean, showing the origin of the flight in Taiwan, stopover in Mauritius, destination of Johannesburg and accident site near Mauritius

When Flight 295 last informed Plaisance air traffic control of its position, its report was incorrectly understood to be relative to the airport rather than its next waypoint, which caused the subsequent search to be concentrated too close to Mauritius. The United States Navy sent aircraft from Diego Garcia, which were used to conduct immediate search and rescue operations in conjunction with the French Navy. By the time the first surface debris was located twelve hours after impact, it had drifted considerably from the impact location. Oil slicks and eight bodies showing signs of extreme trauma appeared in the water. There were no survivors.

After recovery of the wreckage from 4,500 m (14,800 ft) below the surface of the ocean, the aircraft's fuselage and cabin interior were partly reassembled in one of SAA's hangars at Jan Smuts Airport, where it was examined and finally opened for viewing to the airline's staff and selected members of the public. In November 2025, as part of the 38th anniversary commemoration of the disaster, these portions of the wreckage were handed over to the South African Airways Museum at Rand Airport. The material, which had previously been inaccessible to the public, was displayed during a memorial event attended by victims' families, and members of the public.

== Investigation ==
Rennie Van Zyl, South Africa's head crash investigator, examined three wristwatches from baggage recovered from the surface; two of the watches were still running according to Taiwan time. Van Zyl deduced the approximate time of impact at 00:07:00, around three minutes after the last communication with air traffic control.

Immediately after the crash, the press and public opinion suspected that terrorism brought down Flight 295. South Africa, then under the control of the apartheid government, was the target of terrorism both domestically and internationally. Offices for SAA, the country's flag carrier, had previously been attacked and targeted by anti-apartheid protests. A year before, an angry crowd had ransacked the office of South African Airways in Harare. Experts searched for indicators of an explosion on the initial pieces of wreckage discovered, such as surface pitting, impact cavities and spatter cavities caused by white-hot fragments from explosive devices that strike and melt metal alloys found in aircraft structures. Experts found none of this evidence. The investigators drew blood samples from two of the recovered bodies and found that the bodies had soot in their tracheae, indicating that at least two had died from smoke inhalation before the aircraft had crashed, and concluded that some of the passengers would have already lost their lives even if the pilots had successfully reached the airport.

South Africa mounted an underwater search, named 'Operation Resolve', to try to locate the wreckage. The underwater locator beacons (ULBs) attached to the flight recorders were not designed for deep ocean use; nevertheless, a two-month-long sonar search for them was carried out before the effort was abandoned on 8 January 1988 when the ULBs were known to have stopped transmitting (at the time a ULB had to generate sonic pulses for thirty days). Steadfast Oceaneering, a specialist deep-ocean recovery company in the US, was contracted at great expense to find the site and recover the flight recorders. The search area is described as being comparable in size to that of the wreck of the Titanic, with the water at 4,900 metres (16,000 ft) being considerably deeper than any previously successful salvage operation. The wreckage was found on 28 January, within two days of Steadfast Oceaneering commencing its search.

Three debris fields were found: 19°10′30″S 59°38′0″E, 19°9′53″S 59°38′32″E and 19°9′15″S 59°37′25″E. These locations were spread 1.5 km (0.93 mi), 2.3 km (1.4 mi) and 2.5 km (1.6 mi) apart, indicating that the aircraft broke apart in mid-air (it was suggested that the tail separated first). On 6 January 1989, the cockpit voice recorder (CVR) was salvaged successfully from a record depth of 4,900 metres (16,100 ft) by the remotely operated vehicle (ROV) Gemini, but the flight data recorder was never found.

Van Zyl took the voice recorder to the US National Transportation Safety Board (NTSB) in Washington, DC, both to show his goodwill and to ensure neutral observers. Van Zyl believes that if he had kept the CVR in South Africa he could have been accused of covering up the truth. At the NTSB, Van Zyl felt frustration that the degraded (but still functional) CVR, which had been in the deep ocean for fourteen months, did not initially yield any useful information. Around twenty-eight minutes into the recording the CVR indicated that the fire alarm sounded. Fourteen seconds after the fire alarm, the circuit breakers began to pop. Investigators believe that around eighty circuit breakers failed. The CVR cable failed eighty-one seconds after the alarm. The recording revealed the extent of the fire.

Van Zyl discovered that the front-right pallet located in the main deck's cargo hold was the origin of the fire. The flight manifest said that pallet mostly comprised computers in polystyrene packaging. The investigators said that the localised fire likely came in contact with the packaging and produced gases that accumulated near the ceiling. They also said that gases ignited into a flash fire that affected the entire cargo hold. The fire did not burn lower than one metre above the cargo floor. The walls and ceiling of the cargo hold received severe fire damage. Van Zyl ended his investigation without discovering why the fire started.

The official report noted the presence of the computer equipment, and suggested that a possible cause could have been the batteries contained in the computers exploding or spontaneously combusting, although this was not given as a conclusive cause of the fire.

=== Margo commission ===
An official commission of inquiry was chaired by South African Judge Cecil Margo, with co-operation from the NTSB and the aircraft's manufacturer, Boeing. The board of the "Margo Commission" consisted of Judge Cecil S. Margo, Judge Hurrylall Goburdhun (Mauritius), George N. Tompkins Jr (USA), G.C. Wilkinson (UK), Dr Y. Funatsu (Japan), J.J.S. Germisuys (South Africa), Dr J. Gilliland (South Africa), and Colonel Liang Lung (Taiwan).

The official report determined that while Flight 295 was over the Indian Ocean, a fire had occurred in the cargo hold of the main deck, originating in the front right-hand cargo pallet. Aircraft parts recovered from the ocean floor showed fire damage with sustained temperatures over 300 °C (570 °F); tests showed that temperatures of 600 °C (1,100 °F) would have been required to melt a carbon-fibre tennis racket recovered from the crash site. The fire also damaged and destroyed the aircraft's electrical systems resulting in the loss of many of the instruments on the flight deck and rendering the crew unable to determine their position. The reason for the aircraft's loss was not identified beyond doubt, but there were two possibilities detailed in the official report: firstly, that the crew became incapacitated by smoke that penetrated into the cockpit; and secondly, that the fire weakened the structure so that the tail separated, leading to impact with the ocean. The commission concluded that it was not possible to apportion blame to any one individual for the fire, removing any terrorism concerns. Boeing is quoted in the report as having "contested" any scenario that involved a break-up of the aircraft, hence the commission went no further than simply mentioning the two possible scenarios in its final report, as incidental to the primary cause of the accident.

The commission determined that inadequate fire detection and suppression facilities in the class B cargo bays (the type used aboard the 747-200 Combi) were the primary cause of the aircraft's loss. The accident alerted aviation authorities worldwide that the regulations regarding class B cargo bays had lagged far behind the growth in their capacity. The exact source of ignition was never determined, but the report concluded that there was sufficient evidence to confirm that the fire had burned for some considerable time and that it might have caused structural damage.

=== Combi design ===
The crash was the first fire incident on the 747 Combi and one of few fires on widebody aircraft. Fred Bereswill, the investigator from Boeing, characterised the Flight 295 fire as significant for this reason. Barry Strauch of the NTSB visited Boeing's headquarters to inquire about the Combi's design. Boeing's fire test in the Combi models did not accurately match the conditions of Flight 295's cargo hold; in accordance with federal US rules, the Boeing test involved setting a bale of tobacco leaves ablaze. The fire stayed within the cargo hold. The air in the passenger cabin was designed to have a marginally higher pressure than cargo area hold, so if a crew member opened the door to the cargo hold, the air from the passenger cabin would flow into the cargo hold, stopping any smoke or gases from exiting through the door.

Investigators devised a new test involving a cargo hold with conditions similar to the conditions of Flight 295; the plastic covers and extra pallets provided fuel for the fire, which would spread quickly before generating enough smoke to activate smoke alarms. The hotter flame achieved in the new test heated the air in the cargo hold. This heated air had a higher pressure than normal, and overcame the pressure differential between the cargo hold and the passenger cabin. When the door between the passenger and cargo holds was open, smoke and gases therefore flowed into the passenger cabin.

The test, as well as evidence from the accident site, proved to the investigators that the 747 Combi's use of a class B cargo hold did not provide enough fire protection to the passengers. The US Federal Aviation Administration (FAA) confirmed this finding in 1993 with its own series of tests.

After the accident, SAA discontinued use of the Combi and the FAA introduced new regulations in 1993 specifying that manual firefighting must not be the primary means of fire suppression in the cargo compartment of the main deck. The new regulations banned larger cargo hold variants of the 747 Combi; the smaller variants also needed to comply with these new standards, which required weight increases that made the 747 Combi less efficient. Nevertheless, the Combi variants remained in the 747 product line up until 2002, when the last 747-400 Combi was delivered to KLM.

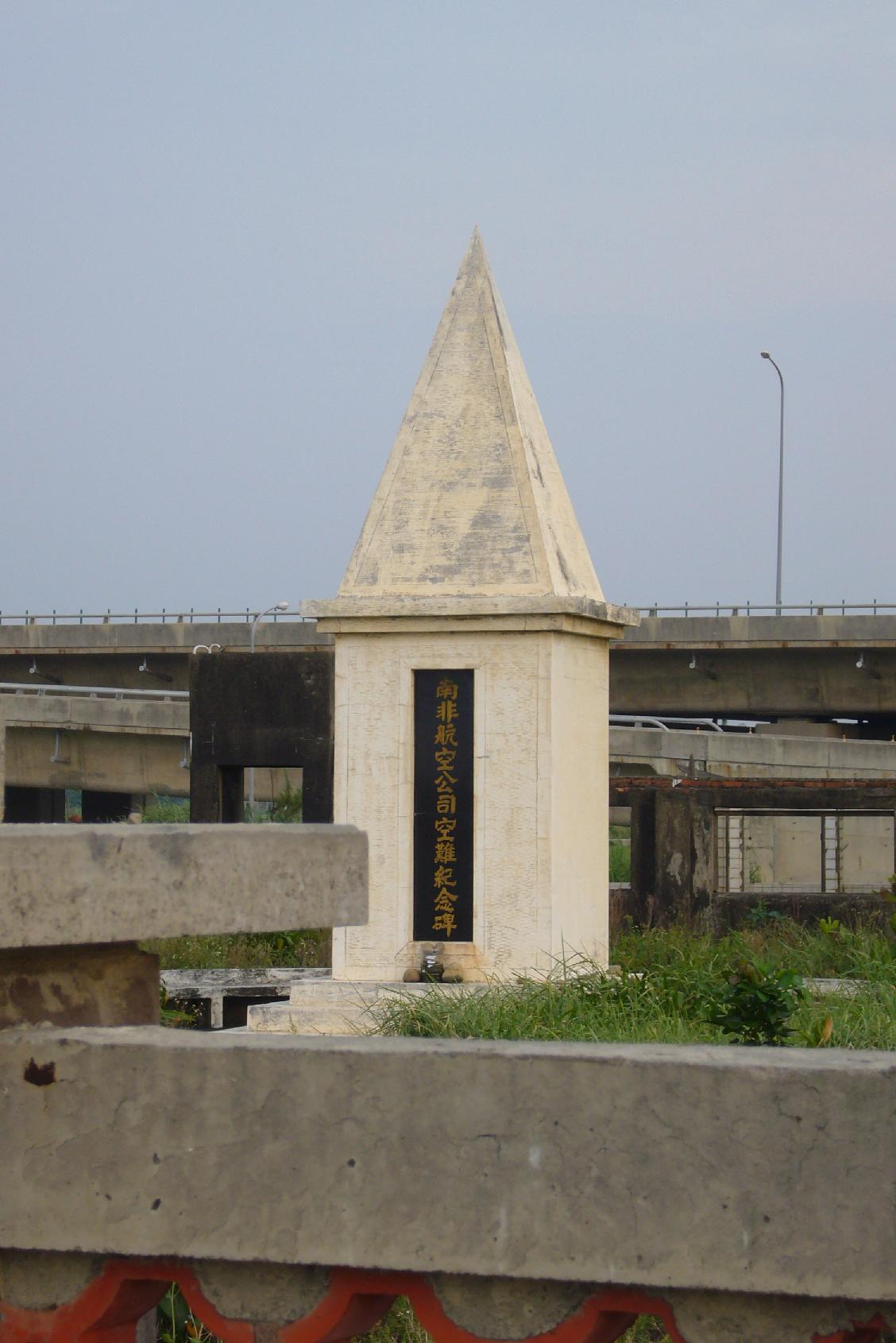
The cenotaph of the South African Airways 295 accident, located near Taiwan Taoyuan International Airport. The cenotaph reads: 南非航空公司空難紀念碑 (Hanyu Pinyin: Nánfēi Hángkōng Gōngsī Kōngnàn Jìnìanbēi, lit. 'South African Airways Air Disaster Cenotaph')

== Fire origin theories ==
In January 1992, the journal of the Royal Aeronautical Society (RAeS) reported that the inquiry into the in-flight fire that destroyed Flight 295 might be reopened because SAA had allegedly confirmed that its passenger jets had carried cargo for Armscor, a South African arms manufacturer. The RAeS journal, Aerospace, asserted: "It is known that the crew and passengers were overcome by a main deck cargo fire, and the ignition of missile rocket fuel is one cause now under suspicion." A complaint against the newspaper that first published the allegations, Weekend Star, was lodged by Armscor.

The inquiry was not reopened, which likely led to the proliferation of a number of conspiracy theories concerning the nature of the cargo that caused the fire, which subsequently increased public doubts about the outcome of the initial inquiry. Examples of such theories include:

- The South African Defence Force was smuggling the hoax substance red mercury on Flight 295 for its atomic bomb project.
- Reports from the Project Coast investigation suggested there was a waybill showing that 300 grams of activated carbon had been placed on board Flight 295, leading to speculation that this substance had caused the fire.

In 2000, the South African television program Carte Blanche dedicated an investigation to a number of these allegations.

A South African government chemist examined a microscopic particle on the nylon netting next to the front-right pallet on Flight 295. The chemist found that the airflow patterns on the iron suggested that it travelled at a high velocity while in a molten state; therefore the fire on Flight 295 may have not been a flash fire triggered by packaging. Fred Bereswill, the investigator from Boeing, said that this would suggest that the source of the fire would have had properties like a sparkler, with the source including its own oxidising agent. A British fire and explosion analyst examined the exterior skin of the aircraft which had been located above the pallet; the analyst found that the skin became as hot as 300 degrees Celsius. Bereswill said that it would be difficult for a fire to burn through the skin of an aircraft in-flight because of the cool airflow outside the aircraft.

David Klatzow, forensic scientist who worked on the case by Boeing's counsel theorized that the fire likely involved substances that would not normally be carried on a passenger aircraft such as wood, cardboard, or plastic, and instead ammonium perchlorate, a chemical compound used in missile propellant from a rocket system loaded on board. South Africa was under an arms embargo at the time and therefore had to buy arms clandestinely.

== Post-apartheid investigation ==
In 1996, the Truth and Reconciliation Committee (TRC), established by the post-apartheid South African government, investigated apartheid-era atrocities. In particular, Flight 295 was investigated to determine if there was any truth behind conspiracy theories that asserted that the Margo Commission had covered up or missed any evidence that might implicate the previous government. Klatzow was invited by the TRC to explain his theories and cross-examine witnesses. Unlike most other hearings of the TRC, the hearing into Flight 295 was conducted in camera, and without any representation from the South African Civil Aviation Authority (CAA); Klatzow considered the CAA untrustworthy because it had participated in the official enquiry, which he considered flawed. A number of key aspects of Klatzow's theory hinged on his criticism of the actions of Judge Margo during the official enquiry, yet Judge Margo was not summoned to answer any of the allegations made against him.

The TRC concluded that nothing listed in the flight manifest could have caused the fire, a conclusion that was met with controversy within the public. Following public pressure, the TRC records were released into the public domain in May 2000. Upon receiving the documents, Transport Minister Dullah Omar stated that the inquiry would be reopened if any fresh evidence was discovered. The South African Police Service were tasked to investigate whether there was any new evidence, and to make a recommendation to the minister. In October 2002, the minister announced that no new evidence had been found to justify re-opening the enquiry.

On the 25th anniversary of the crash, Peter Otzen Jnr, the son of one of the victims, announced that he was approaching the Constitutional Court of South Africa in an attempt to have the commission of inquiry into the disaster reopened. In pursuit of this, he had obtained affidavits from former SAA employees who had never given any evidence before. An Australian national named Allan Dexter who had worked in public relations for SAA gave a sworn statement to Otzen claiming that he had been informed by the SAA manager at Taipei airport that Flight 295 was carrying rocket fuel which caused it to crash, and that the Captain had expressed concerns about the safety of the cargo but had been ordered from Johannesburg to fly the plane. In a 2014 interview, some of the accusations were disputed by Tinus Jacobs, SAA's manager in Taiwan who saw Flight 295 off. Jacobs claimed that due to Taiwan's status under martial law at the time, only one telephone at the airport (located in the office of China Airlines) could be used to make international calls and that none of Flight 295's crew had access to it. Jacobs furthermore claimed that Captain Uys and the other crew members appeared relaxed and routine both the previous day and on the evening of the flight's departure.

== Newer theories ==
David Klatzow also contended that fire started above the South China Sea, shortly after takeoff based on the pilots' conversation of dinner. The captain did not immediately land and was instead ordered to continue on to Mauritius, many hours away, in hope of making it there before the aircraft's structural integrity gave in. These points have been refuted because the severity of the fire as recorded on the CVR was enough to destroy the wiring to many electrical systems including the recorder and also would have certainly damaged the windows in the cargo hold to the point where pressurization could not be maintained, precluding continuous flight at high altitude.

In 2014, South African investigative journalist Mark D. Young presented a theory that a short circuit in the onboard electronics may have started the fire. The so-called wet arc tracking arises from the action of moisture when the insulation of live wires is damaged. A leakage current to another damaged wire with the respective potential difference may form. The resulting flashover may reach temperatures of up to 5,000 °C (9,000 °F). This temperature is sufficient to ignite the thermal-acoustic insulation blankets that were in use at the time until the late 1990s. Such a short circuit may have caused the fire on board Swissair Flight 111, resulting in the crash of the aircraft in 1998. According to the Austrian journalist and aviation expert Patrick Huber, however, a short circuit is unlikely to be the cause of the fire. According to experts consulted by the author, this problem only existed in the Boeing 747 with older cables. However, the "Helderberg" was only seven years old.

== Passengers and crew ==
Passengers and crew nationalities on board SAA Flight 295:

Nationality	Passengers	Crew	Total
Australia	2	0	2
Hong Kong	2	0	2
Denmark	1	0	1
Japan	47	0	47
Mauritius	2	0	2
Netherlands	1	0	1
South Africa	52	19	71
South Korea	1	0	1
Taiwan	30	0	30
United Kingdom	1	0	1
West Germany	1	0	1
Total	140	19	159

Taiwanese authorities stated that 58 passengers began flying in Taipei, including 30 Taiwanese citizens, 19 South Africans, 47 Japanese, two Mauritians, one Dane, one Dutch, one Briton, and one German. The other passengers transferred from other flights arriving in Taipei, and as such their nationalities were not known to Taiwanese authorities.

At least two passengers died of smoke inhalation. The rest died from the extreme trauma sustained in the crash.

Among the passengers was Kazuharu Sonoda, a Japanese professional wrestler also known as Haru Sonoda and Magic Dragon, and his wife, who were travelling as part of their honeymoon. They were offered and sent on the flight by All Japan Pro-Wrestling president Giant Baba to appear on a wrestling show in South Africa, promoted by fellow wrestler Tiger Jeet Singh.

== Dramatization ==
The crash was featured in Season 5 of the Canadian-made, internationally distributed documentary series Mayday, in the episode "Fanning the Flames."

== See also ==
- List of unrecovered and unusable flight recorders
- UPS Airlines Flight 6, another Boeing 747-400 Freighter that crashed because of an onboard fire
- Asiana Airlines Flight 991, another Boeing 747-400 Freighter that crashed into the East China Sea after experiencing in-flight fire
