= Kayser's Beach =

- Location within Eastern Cape Location within South Africa
- Coordinates: 33°12′26″S 27°36′37″E
- Country: South Africa
- Province: Eastern Cape
- Municipality: Buffalo City

Area
  - Total: 2.36 km^{2} (0.91 sq mi)

Population (2011)
  - Total: 697
  - Density: 295/km^{2} (765/sq mi)

Racial makeup (2011)
  - Black African: 45.3%
  - Coloured: 1.0%
  - White: 53.6%
  - Other: 0.1%

First languages (2011)
  - English: 45.0%
  - Xhosa: 40.9%
  - Afrikaans: 12.2%
  - Sign language: 1.0%
  - Other: 0.9%
- Time zone: UTC+2 (SAST)

Kayser's Beach is a small village on the shore of the Indian Ocean, 35 kilometres (22 mi) southwest of East London in the Eastern Cape province of South Africa. According to the census of 2011 it had 697 inhabitants.

On 13 March 1967, the South African Airways Flight 406 crashed into the sea at Kayser's Beach, resulting in the loss of 25 lives.
