= Amathole Marine Protected Area =

Marine conservation area in the Eastern Cape in South Africa

- Amathole MPA location
- Location: Eastern Cape, South Africa
- Nearest city: East London
- Coordinates: 33°14′S 27°59′E
- Established: 2011
- Governing body: Eastern Cape Parks and Tourism Agency
- Amathole Marine Protected Area (South Africa)

The Amathole Marine Protected Area is an inshore conservation region in the territorial waters of South Africa, near East London on the coast of the Eastern Cape.

== History ==
The MPA was proclaimed in 2011 by Edna Molewa, then Minister of water and Environment affairs, in terms of the Marine Living Resources Act, 18 of 1998 and transferred in 2014 by presidential pronouncement to Section 22A of the National Environmental Management: Protected Areas Act 2003.

== Purpose ==
A marine protected area is defined by the IUCN as "A clearly defined geographical space, recognised, dedicated and managed, through legal or other effective means, to achieve the long-term conservation of nature with associated ecosystem services and cultural values".

Thus MPA is intended as a sanctuary for over-exploited fish and invertebrate species, particularly Sparidae, shad, whales and dolphins, and to provide a baseline for research. Habitats protected include intertidal and subtidal rocky reefs, sandy beach and nearshore and estuarine unconsolidated benthos.

== Extent ==
The MPA protects about 54 km of shoreline and about 248 km^{2} of ocean in three separate sections, Gxulu, Gonubie and Kei.

=== Boundaries ===
There are three parts to the Amathole MPA. Boundaries are defined with reference to the WGS 84 datum in degrees and decimal minutes.

The Gxulu area:

- The sea from the high water mark for a distance about three nautical miles seaward between:
- a line running at 149°T from Christmas Rock at S33º11.560′, E027º38.626′, to S33º14.018′, E027º40.422′, (the south western boundary), and * a line running at 144ºT from the Gxulu River mouth at S33º07.145′, E027º43.893′ to S33º09.513′, E027º45.913′, (the north eastern boundary), and
- the line between the outer ends of the NE and SW boundaries from S33º09.513′, E027º45.913′ to S33º14.018′, E027º40.422′, (the south-eastern boundary), and excludes estuaries.

The Gonubie area:

- The sea from the high water mark for a distance about three nautical miles seaward between:
- a line running at 145°T from Nahoon Point at S32º59.778′, E027º57.096′, to S33°02.213′, E027°59.119′, (the south western boundary), and
- a line running at 145ºT from Gonubie Point at S32º56.485′, E028º02.120′ to S33º09.513′, E027º45.913′, (the north eastern boundary), and
- the line between the outer ends of the NE and SW boundaries from S33º09.513′, E027º45.913′ to S32°58.955′ E028°04.125′, (the south-eastern boundary), and excludes estuaries.

The Kei area:

- The sea offshore of the high water mark from the mouth of the Kei River at S32°40.816′, E028°23.193′ to the mouth of the Nyara River at S32°47.000′, E028°10.883′ and
- inshore of a series of straight lines joining eight offshore positions in the sequence listed below ending at the mouth of the Kei River.
  - S32°49.464′, E28°12.877′,
  - S32°49.332′, E28°14.245′,
  - S32°48.679′, E28°16.369′,
  - S32°47.807′, E28°18.335′,
  - S32°44.925′, E28°22.487′,
  - S32°44.695′, E28°24.200′,
  - S32°44.380′, E28°24.691′,
  - S32°42.833′, E28°25.266′,
- The south-western boundary bears 146°T from the mouth of the Nyara River, and the north-eastern boundary bears 139°T from the mouth of the Kei River.

=== Zonation ===
All three sections of the MPA are controlled zones.

== Management ==
The marine protected areas of South Africa are the responsibility of the national government, which has management agreements with a variety of MPA management authorities, in this case, Eastern Cape Parks (ECPTA), which manages the MPA with funding from the SA Government through the Department of Forestry, Fisheries and the Environment (DFFE), which is responsible for issuing permits, quotas and law enforcement.

The MPA has not been assigned an IUCN Category. Fishing, spearfishing and bait collection from the shore are allowed but no extractive resource use by boat is allowed.

As of 2021, a management plan was awaiting review by ECPTA before submission to DFFE.

== Ecology ==
Marine ecoregions of the South African Exclusive Economic Zone: Amathola Marine Protected Area is in the Agulhas ecoregion

The MPA is in the warm temperate Agulhas inshore marine bioregion to the east of Cape Point which extends eastwards to the Mbashe River. There are a large proportion of species endemic to South Africa along this coastline.

Three major habitats exist in the sea in this region, distinguished by the nature of the substrate. The substrate, or base material, is important in that it provides a base to which an organism can anchor itself, which is vitally important for those organisms which need to stay in one particular kind of place. Rocky shores and reefs provide a firm fixed substrate for the attachment of plants and animals. Some of these may have Kelp forests, which reduce the effect of waves and provide food and shelter for an extended range of organisms. Sandy beaches and bottoms are a relatively unstable substrate and cannot anchor kelp or many of the other benthic organisms. Finally there is open water, above the substrate and clear of the kelp forest, where the organisms must drift or swim. Mixed habitats are also frequently found, which are a combination of those mentioned above. There are no significant estuarine habitats in the MPA.

Rocky shores and reefs There are rocky reefs and mixed rocky and sandy bottoms. For many marine organisms the substrate is another type of marine organism, and it is common for several layers to co-exist. Examples of this are red bait pods, which are usually encrusted with sponges, ascidians, bryozoans, anemones, and gastropods, and abalone, which are usually covered by similar seaweeds to those found on the surrounding rocks, usually with a variety of other organisms living on the seaweeds.

The type of rock of the reef is of some importance, as it influences the range of possibilities for the local topography, which in turn influences the range of habitats provided, and therefore the diversity of inhabitants. Sandstone and other sedimentary rocks erode and weather very differently, and depending on the direction of dip and strike, and steepness of the dip, may produce reefs which are relatively flat to very high profile and full of small crevices. These features may be at varying angles to the shoreline and wave fronts. There are fewer large holes, tunnels and crevices in sandstone reefs, but often many deep but low near-horizontal crevices.

Sandy beaches and bottoms (including shelly, pebble and gravel bottoms) Sandy bottoms at first glance appear to be fairly barren areas, as they lack the stability to support many of the spectacular reef based species, and the variety of large organisms is relatively low. The sand is continually being moved around by wave action, to a greater or lesser degree depending on weather conditions and exposure of the area. This means that sessile organisms must be specifically adapted to areas of relatively loose substrate to thrive in them, and the variety of species found on a sandy or gravel bottom will depend on all these factors. Sandy bottoms have one important compensation for their instability, animals can burrow into the sand and move up and down within its layers, which can provide feeding opportunities and protection from predation. Other species can dig themselves holes in which to shelter, or may feed by filtering water drawn through the tunnel, or by extending body parts adapted to this function into the water above the sand.

The open sea The pelagic water column is the major part of the living space at sea. This is the water between the surface and the top of the benthic zone, where living organisms swim, float or drift, and the food chain starts with phytoplankton, the mostly microscopic photosynthetic organisms that convert the energy of sunlight into organic material which feeds nearly everything else, directly or indirectly. In temperate seas there are distinct seasonal cycles of phytoplankton growth, based on the available nutrients and the available sunlight. Either can be a limiting factor. Phytoplankton tend to thrive where there is plenty of light, and they themselves are a major factor in restricting light penetration to greater depths, so the photosynthetic zone tends to be shallower in areas of high productivity. Zooplankton feed on the phytoplankton, and are in turn eaten by larger animals. The larger pelagic animals are generally faster moving and more mobile, giving them the option of changing depth to feed or to avoid predation, and to move to other places in search of a better food supply.

=== Endemism ===
The MPA is in the warm temperate Agulhas ecoregion to the east of Cape Point which extends eastwards to the Mbashe River. There are a large proportion of species endemic to South Africa along this coastline.

== Threats ==
Threats include poaching of fish and abalone, and there is limited compliance capacity for dealing with illegal, unreported and unregulated fishing (IUU) in the MPA by trawlers and ski-boats, complicated by 15 boat launch sites in the area. There is also land-based pollution from rivers, agriculture, urban runoff, and inappropriate coastal development.

== See also ==
Marine protected areas of South Africa

- List of protected areas of South Africa
- Marine protected areas of South Africa – Protected areas of coastline or ocean in the EEZ of South Africa
