= Haga Haga =

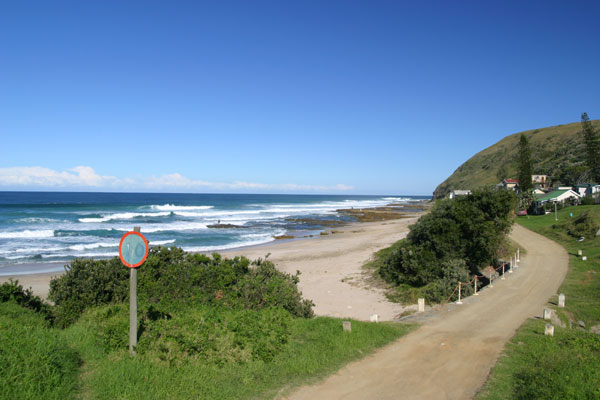
- The view of Whale Point from Haga Haga

- Location within Eastern Cape Location within South Africa Location within Africa
- Coordinates: 32.762°S 28.250°E
- Country: South Africa
- Province: Eastern Cape
- District: Amathole
- Municipality: Great Kei
- Established: 1920

Area
  - Total: 1.75 km^{2} (0.68 sq mi)
- Elevation: 3 m (9.8 ft)

Population (2011)
  - Total: 134
  - Density: 76.6/km^{2} (198/sq mi)

Racial makeup (2011)
  - Black African: 40.3%
  - Coloured: 0.7%
  - White: 59.0%

First languages (2011)
  - English: 51.1%
  - Xhosa: 36.8%
  - Afrikaans: 8.3%
  - Zulu: 2.3%
  - Other: 1.5%
- Time zone: UTC+2 (SAST)
- PO box: 5272

Haga Haga is a village on the Eastern Cape Wild Coast of South Africa, 60 km east of East London.

Hagahaga originates from the word 'haga' which is the number four in Khoikhoi with 'hagahaga' meaning to make to four.

The village has been declared a conservancy owing to a number of rare indigenous species found in the area, such as the Cape clawless otter and the blue duiker.
