= Gonubie =

- Location within Eastern Cape Location within South Africa Location within Africa
- Coordinates: 32.943°S 28.008°E
- Country: South Africa
- Province: Eastern Cape
- Municipality: Buffalo City

Area
  - Total: 10.11 km^{2} (3.90 sq mi)

Population (2011)
  - Total: 11,471
  - Density: 1,135/km^{2} (2,939/sq mi)

Racial makeup (2011)
  - Black African: 26.7%
  - Coloured: 2.6%
  - Indian/Asian: 1.4%
  - White: 68.5%
  - Other: 0.8%

First languages (2011)
  - English: 56.6%
  - Afrikaans: 20.5%
  - Xhosa: 19.7%
  - Other: 3.2%
- Time zone: UTC+2 (SAST)
- Postal code (street): 5256
- PO box: 5256
- Area code: 043

Gonubie is a beachside town in the Eastern Cape province of South Africa.

Named after the Gqunube River to the north, the name is said to be derived from Khoekhoen and to mean 'bramble river', after Royena growing there.

== About Gonubie ==
Gonubie has about 11,500 residents, who reside in the lower income area of Mzamomhle, the middle income area of Riegerton Park, and the majority of the residents residing in the middle to upper income bracket avenues and streets. Gonubie has 18 avenues and 12 streets. There is also the lavish riverside area, which is a popular tourist destination. Gonubie main beach is a beautiful sandy beach with a boardwalk of international standard. In 2010/11 Gonubie Beach was awarded the prestigious Blue Flag beach award. The river serves as a great place for activities such as canoeing and kayaking.

Gonubie is today being developed as a residential exurb just outside the city of KuGompo City and has become a bedroom community with much of its working population commuting to East London to work or study.

== Geography ==
Gonubie is situated approximately 18 kilometres (11,2 miles) north-east of KuGompo City on the mouth of the Gqunube River.

== Transport ==
Gonubie is bypassed by the major N2 freeway to the west, routing traffic heading north from KuGompo City towards Mthatha. Gonubie is connected to the N2 by Main Road at the exit 1054.

Main Road (M10) is the sole access route into Gonubie and serves as the main thoroughfare through the coastal town leading from the main beach towards Beacon Bay and East London to the south.
