= Amathole District Municipality =

Amathole Amatola District
- District municipality
- Seal

- Location in South Africa
- Interactive map of Amathole District Municipality (2026)
- Coordinates: 32°30′S 27°30′E
- Country: South Africa
- Province: Eastern Cape
- Seat: East London
- Local municipalities: List: Mbhashe; Mnquma; Great Kei; Amahlathi; Ngqushwa; Raymond Mhlaba

Government
  - Type: Municipal council
  - Mayor: Anele Ntsangani (ANC)

Area
  - Total: 21,595 km^{2} (8,338 sq mi)

Population (2011)
  - Total: 892,637
  - Density: 41.335/km^{2} (107.06/sq mi)

Racial makeup (2011)
  - Black African: 97.2%
  - Coloured: 1.5%
  - Indian/Asian: 0.1%
  - White: 1.0%

First languages (2011)
  - Xhosa: 93.6%
  - English: 2.3%
  - Afrikaans: 2.1%
  - Other: 2%
- Time zone: UTC+2 (SAST)
- Municipal code: DC12

The Amathole District Municipality (Xhosa: uMasipala weSithili sase Amathole) is one of the 7 districts of the Eastern Cape province of South Africa. The seat is East London. As of 2011, over 90% of its 892,637 inhabitants spoke isiXhosa. The district code is DC12. Amathole means "calves", the name of the mountain range and forest which form the northern boundary of the district.

== Government ==
The Executive Mayor of Amathole District Municipality since 2016 is Anele Ntsangani, [] and the Municipal Manager is [Dr Bhekisisa J Mthembu].

== Geography ==
=== Neighbours ===
Amathole is surrounded by:

- Chris Hani District (DC13) to the north
- OR Tambo District (DC15) to the north-east
- the Indian Ocean to the south-east
- Sarah Baartman District (DC10) to west

=== Local municipalities ===
The district contains the following local municipalities:

Local municipality	Population	%
Mnquma	252,390	28.27%
Mbhashe	254,909	28.56%
Amahlathi	122,778	13.75%
Ngqushwa	72,190	8.09%
Great Kei	38,991	4.37%
Raymond Mhlaba	151,379	16.96%

Raymond Mhlaba Local Municipality, following amalgamation of Nxuba (24,264; 2.72%) and Nkonkobe (127,115; 14.24%)] municipalities.

== Demographics ==
The following statistics are from the 2011 census.

=== Languages ===
Language	Population	%
Xhosa	817,395	93.62%
English	19,647	2.25%
Afrikaans	18,230	2.09%
Sign language	5,164	0.59%
Zulu	2,637	0.30%
Other	2,391	0.27%
Sotho	2,069	0.24%
Northern Sotho	1,741	0.20%
Ndebele	1,691	0.19%
Tswana	1,167	0.13%
Venda	401	0.05%
Swati	345	0.04%
Tsonga	250	0.03%

=== Gender ===
Gender	Population	%
Female	473,389	53.03%
Male	419,247	46.97%

=== Ethnic group ===
Ethnic group	Population	%
Black African	868,017	97.24%
Coloured	13,133	1.47%
White	8,949	1.00%
Indian/Asian	1,126	0.13%

=== Age ===
Age	Population	%
000 - 004	147,098	8.84%
005 - 009	192,361	11.56%
010 - 014	216,586	13.01%
015 - 019	208,995	12.56%
020 - 024	146,750	8.82%
025 - 029	115,632	6.95%
030 - 034	99,327	5.97%
035 - 039	96,666	5.81%
040 - 044	92,560	5.56%
045 - 049	77,430	4.65%
050 - 054	59,027	3.55%
055 - 059	47,029	2.83%
060 - 064	53,352	3.21%
065 - 069	38,858	2.33%
070 - 074	31,716	1.91%
075 - 079	18,830	1.13%
080 - 084	15,262	0.92%
085 - 089	4,022	0.24%
090 - 094	2,026	0.12%
095 - 099	559	0.03%
100 plus	173	0.01%

== Politics ==
=== Election results ===
Election results for Amathole in the South African general election, 2004.

- Population 18 and over: 979,166 [58.83% of total population]
- Total votes: 630,953 [37.91% of total population]
- Voting % estimate: 64.44% votes as a % of population 18 and over

Party	Votes	%
African National Congress	523,630	82.99%
United Democratic Movement	50,559	8.01%
Democratic Alliance	32,467	5.15%
Pan Africanist Congress of Azania	7,627	1.21%
African Christian Democratic Party	4,492	0.71%
Independent Democrats	3,680	0.58%
New National Party	2,600	0.41%
Freedom Front Plus	795	0.13%
Inkhata Freedom Party	785	0.12%
Azanian People's Organisation	765	0.12%
SOPA	740	0.12%
United Christian Democratic Party	625	0.10%
EMSA	407	0.06%
Peace and Justice Congress	400	0.06%
UF	293	0.05%
National Alliance	269	0.04%
Christian Democratic Party	257	0.04%
TOP	236	0.04%
Keep It Straight and Simple Party	132	0.02%
New Labour Party	109	0.02%
Minority Front	85	0.01%
Total	630,953	100.00%

== Maladministration ==
As of January 2024, the municipality is under administration, one of 32 in the country, and three in the Eastern Cape where the provincial executive has intervened due to maladministration
