= KwaZulu–Cape coastal forest mosaic =

Subtropical moist broadleaf forest ecoregion of South Africa

KwaZulu-Cape coastal forest mosaic
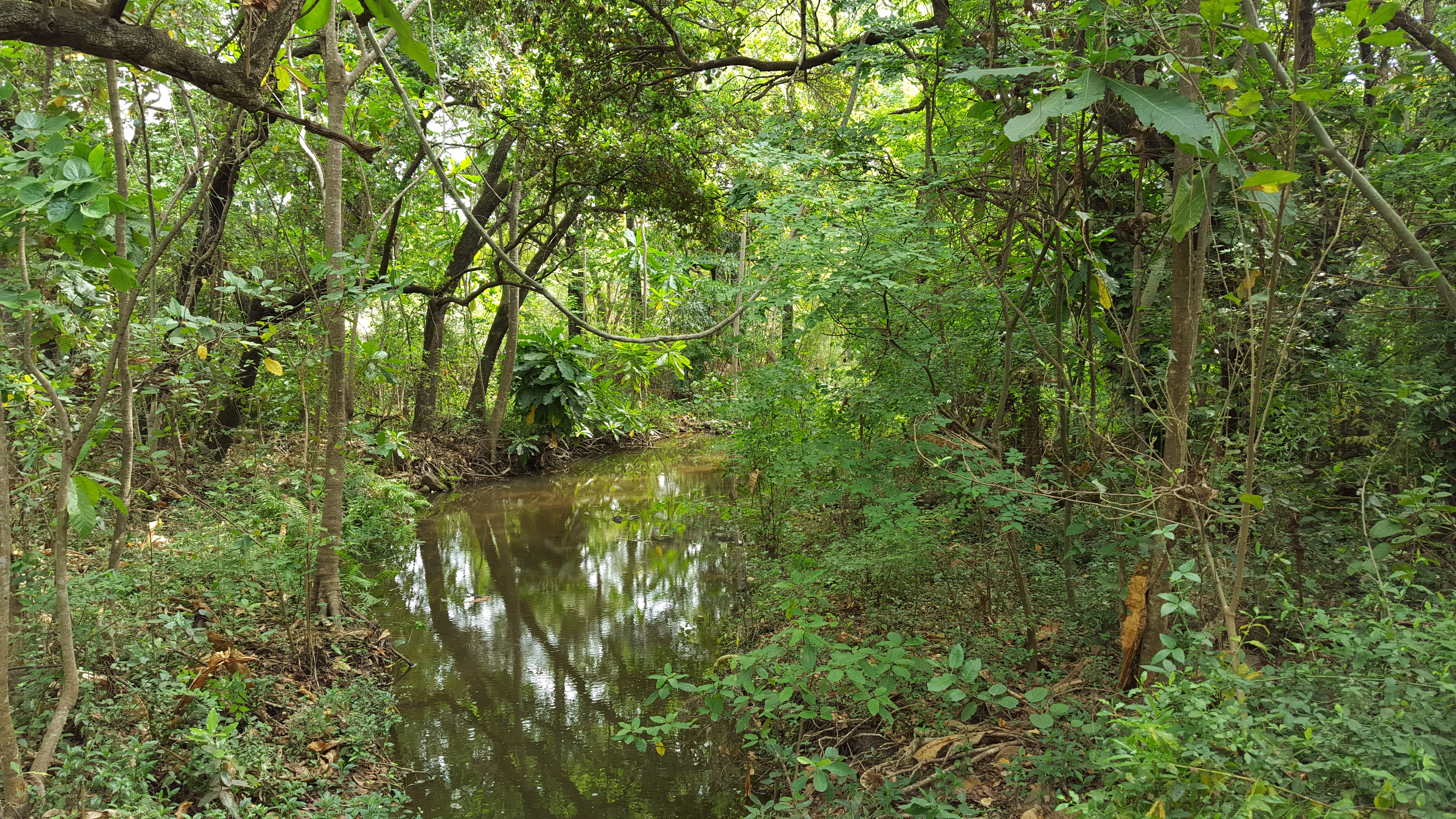
- Umkomaas Forest south of Durban

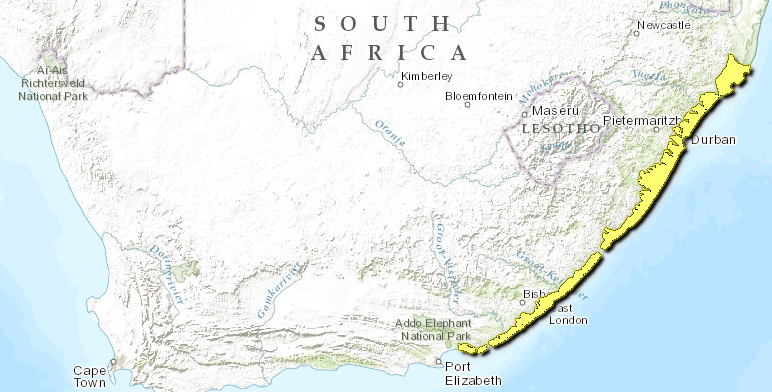
- Map of the KwaZulu-Cape coastal forest mosaic

Ecology
- Realm: Afrotropical
- Biome: tropical and subtropical moist broadleaf forests
- Borders: Albany thickets; Drakensberg montane grasslands, woodlands, and forests; Maputaland coastal forest mosaic; Maputaland-Pondoland bushland and thickets

Geography
- Area: 17,870 km^{2} (6,900 sq mi)
- Country: South Africa
- Coordinates: 30.4°S 30.53°E

Conservation
- Conservation status: Critical/endangered
- Protected: 9%

The Kwazulu-Cape coastal forest mosaic is a subtropical moist broadleaf forest ecoregion of South Africa. It covers an area of 17,800 square kilometers (6,900 sq mi) in South Africa's Eastern Cape and KwaZulu-Natal provinces.

== Limits ==
The Kwazulu-Cape coastal forest mosaic occupies the humid coastal strip between the Indian Ocean and the foothills of the Drakensberg mountains. It is part of a strip of moist coastal forests that extend along Africa's Indian Ocean coast from southern Somalia to South Africa. The northern limit of the ecoregion is at the St. Lucia estuary in KwaZulu Natal, where the forests transition to the Maputaland coastal forest mosaic. The southern limit is at Cape St. Francis, east of Port Elizabeth in the Eastern Cape Province, where the KwaZulu-Cape forests transition to the Albany thickets.

== Climate ==
The ecoregion has a seasonally-moist subtropical climate. Rainfall ranges from 1500 mm to 900 mm per year. The northern portion is generally receives more rainfall, typically in the summer months, while the southern portion receives most of its rainfall in the winter months, which is typical of the Mediterranean climate region to the west. Rainfall diminishes away from the coast, and the coastal forest mosaic yields to the drier Maputaland-Pondoland bushland and thickets in the Drakensberg foothills, above 300 to 450 meters elevation.

== Flora ==
The ecoregion comprises a mosaic of different plant communities, including coastal belt forest, sand forest, dune forest, short, dry forests known as Alexandria forest, grasslands, palm woodlands, and thorn scrublands. Forests are typically made up of evergreen trees, interspersed with dry-season semi-deciduous and deciduous trees.

Endemics include Rhynchocalyx.

== Protected areas ==
Approximately 9% of the ecoregion is in protected areas. Protected areas include Addo Elephant National Park, Amatikulu Nature Reserve, Dwesa-Cwebe Nature Reserve, East London Coast Nature Reserve, Great Fish River Nature Reserve, Geelkrans Nature Reserve, Hluleka Nature Reserve, Kap River Nature Reserve, Mansfield Game Reserve, Mbumbazi Nature Reserve, Mkhambathi Nature Reserve, Richards Bay Nature Reserve, Sunshine Coast Nature Reserve, Vernon Crookes Nature Reserve, and Woody Cape Nature Reserve.

== See also ==
- Coastal forests of eastern Africa – Tropical moist forest region in Africa
- Tropical and subtropical moist broadleaf forests – Habitat type defined by the World Wide Fund for Nature
