= Eastern Cape Parks =

Body responsible for Parks in the Eastern Cape, South Africa

Eastern Cape Parks are the national parks, marine protected areas, nature reserves and other nature conservation areas in the Eastern Cape province of South Africa. Eastern Cape Parks and Tourism Agency (ECPTA) is the governmental organisation responsible for maintaining wilderness areas and public nature reserves in the Eastern Cape, based in East London.

== National Parks situated in the Eastern Cape ==
- Camdeboo National Park
- Addo Elephant National Park
- Mountain Zebra National Park
- Garden Route National Park, consisting of:
  - Knysna National Lake Area (Western Cape)
  - Tsitsikamma National Park (Eastern Cape)
  - Wilderness National Park (Western Cape)

== Mega Parks in the making, predominantly in the Eastern Cape ==
- Greater Addo Elephant National Park
  - Addo Elephant National Park
  - Woody Cape Nature Reserve
  - Addo Elephant National Park Marine Protected Area
    - Bird Island
    - St. Croix Island, Algoa Bay
- Baviaanskloof Mega Reserve
  - Baviaanskloof Reserve (Western Cape)
  - Baviaanskloof Provincial Nature Reserve
  - Baviaanskloof Wilderness Area, privately owned.
  - Baviaanskloof Conservation Area
  - Guerna Wilderness Nature Reserve
  - Kouga Wilderness Area
  - Kouga private Nature Reserve
  - Berg Plaatz Provincial Reserve
  - Sepree River Private Nature Reserve
  - Beakosneck Private Natur Reserve
  - Berg Plaatz Provincial Nature Reserve

== Parks managed by Eastern Cape Parks and Tourism Agency ==
- Cape Morgan Nature Reserve
- Commando Drift Nature Reserve
- Dwesa Nature Reserve also known as the Dwesa-Cwebe Provincial Nature Reserve
  - Dwesa-Cwebe Marine Protected Area
- East London Coast Nature Reserve
- Fort Fordyce Nature Reserve
- Great Fish River Nature Reserve
  - Andries Vosloo Kudu Reserve
  - Double Drift Nature Reserve
  - Sam Knott Nature Reserve
- Great Kei Nature Reserve
  - Kei Mouth Reserve
  - Great Kei River Private Nature Reserve
- Hluleka Nature Reserve also known as Hluleka Provincial Nature Reserve
  - Hluleka Marine Protected Area
- King William's Town Nature Reserve
- Mkhambathi Nature Reserve also known as Mkambati
  - Pondoland Marine Protected Area
- Mpofu Nature Reserve also known as Mpofu Provincial Game Reserve
- Oviston Nature Reserve
- Silaka Nature Reserve also known as Silaka Provincial Wilderness Reserve
- Thomas Baines Nature Reserve
- Tsolwana Nature Reserve
- Water's Meeting Nature Reserve

== Natural Heritage Sites ==
- Barville Park Natural Heritage Site
- Elmhurst Natural Heritage Site
- Glendour Natural Heritage Site
- Kasouga Farm Natural Heritage Site
- Kruizemuntfontein Natural Heritage Site

== Private and Other Parks ==
- Aberdeen Nature Reserve
- Alexandria Coast Reserve
- Amakhala Game Reserve
- Amalinda Nature Reserve
- Asanta Sana Game Reserve
- Aylesbury Nature Reserve
- Beggar's Bush Nature Reserve
- Bayeti Game Reserve
- Beakosneck Private Nature Reserve
- Buffelspruit Nature Reserve
- Makana Coleridge Game Reserve
- Citruslandgoed Game Farm
- Christmas Rock to Gxulu River Marine Protected Area
- Dorn Boom Game Farm
- East Cape Game Farm
- Emlanjeni Private Game Reserve
- Groendal Wilderness Nature Reserve (Mierhoopplaat)
- Guerna Wilderness Nature Reserve see Baviaanskloof Mega Reserve
- Hoeksfontein Game Farm
- Hillside Safaris Game Farm
- Hopewell Game Reserve
- Hunters Lodge Game Farm
- Hunts Hoek Safaris Game Farm
- Inkwenkwezi Private Game Reserve
- Inthaba Lodge Game Farm
- Jarandi Safaris Game Farm
- Karoo Safaris Game Farm
- Kingsdale Game Farm
- Koedoeskop Game Farm
- Kuzuko Game Reserve
- Kwandwe Private Game Reserve
- Lady Slipper Nature Reserve
- Lanka Safaris Game Farm
- Loerie Dam Nature Reserve
- Lottering Coast Reserve
- Luchaba Wildlife Reserve
- Mbumbazi Nature Reserve
- Mierhoopplaat Nature Reserve
- Minnawill Game Farm
- Monteaux Game Farm
- Mpofu Provincial Game Reserve
- Nyara River Mouth Marine Area
- Oudekraal Game Farm
- Rockdale Game Farm
- Rupert Game Farm
- Samara Private Game Reserve
- Scotia Safaris Game Farm
- Schuilpatdop Game Farm
- Sepree River Private Nature Reserve
- Shamwari Game Reserve
- Stinkhoutberg Nature Reserve
- Timbili Game Reserve
- Tregathlyn Game Farm
- Trumpeter's Drift Game Farm

== Forest Reserves ==
- Andrews State Forest
- Blue Lily's Bush Forest Reserve
- Hankey State Forest
- Hogsback State Forest
- Inyarha (Nyara) Forest Reserve
- Isidenge State Forest
- Katberg State Forest
- Kologha Forest Reserve
- Koomans Bush State Reserve
- Kruisrivier Forest Reserve
- Kubusi Indigenous State Forest
- Longmore State Forest
- Lottering Forest Reserve
- Plaatbos Forest Nature Reserve
- Robbe Hoek Forest Reserve
- Storms River Forest, part of the Tsitsikamma National Park
- Welbedacht State Forest
- Witelsbos State Forest

== See also ==
- South African National Parks
- Protected areas of South Africa
