= Maputaland–Pondoland bushland and thickets =

Montane shrubland ecoregion in South Africa

Coordinates: 30°40′S 29°24′E

Maputaland-Pondoland bushland and thickets
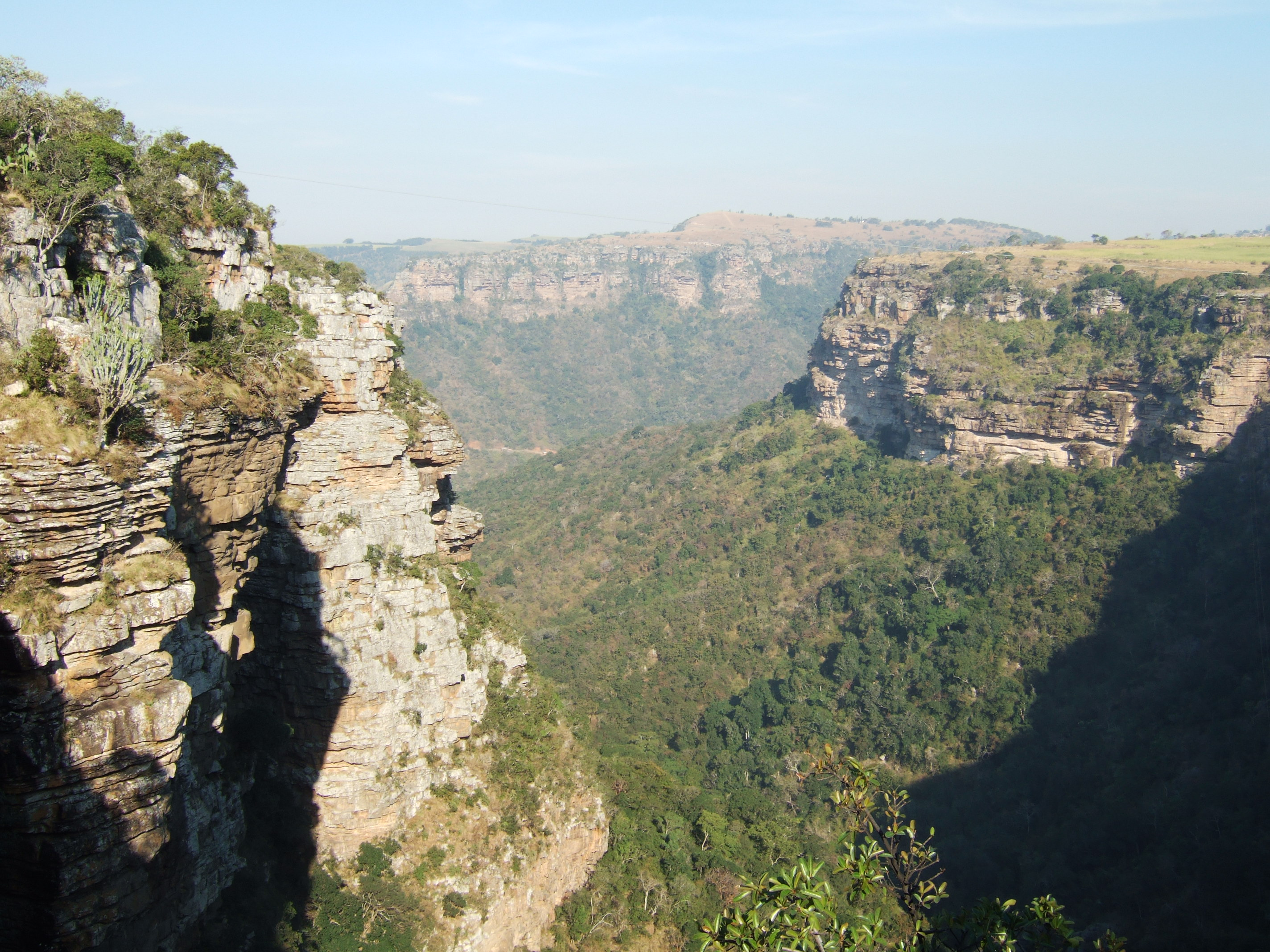
- Oribi Gorge

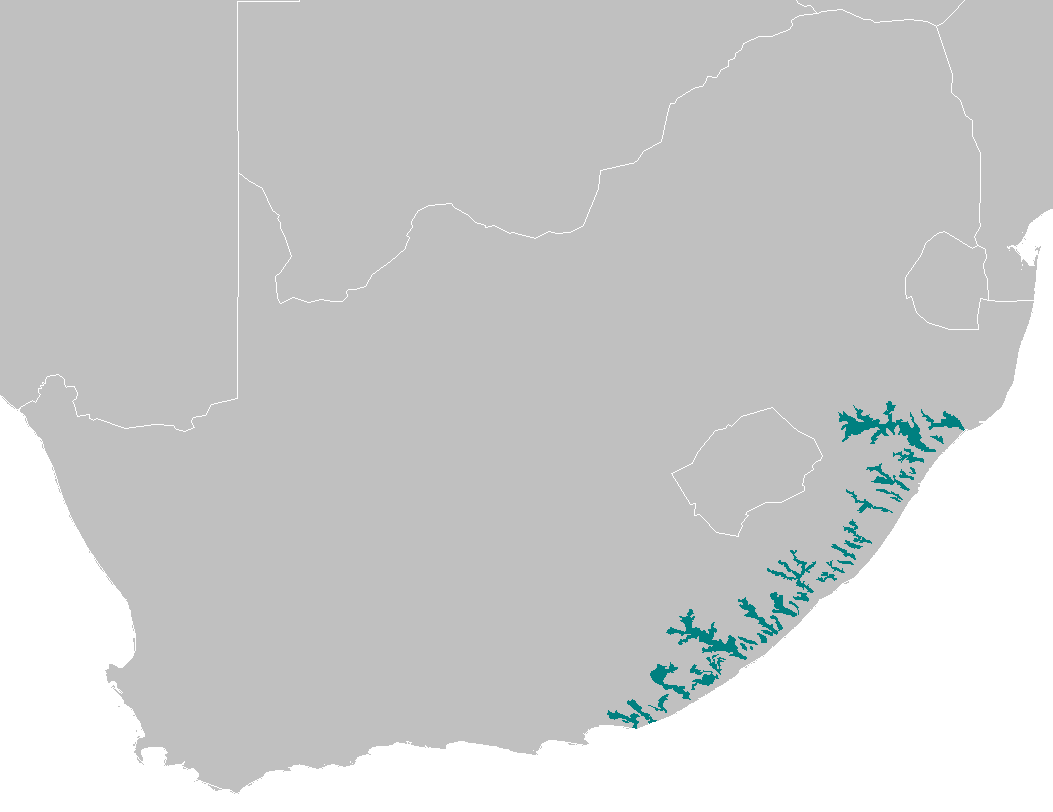
- Map of the Maputaland-Pondoland bushland and thickets

Ecology
- Realm: Afrotropical
- Biome: montane grasslands and shrublands
- Borders: Albany thickets; Drakensberg montane grasslands, woodlands, and forests; Kwazulu-Cape coastal forest mosaic, Nama Karoo

Geography
- Area: 19,400 km^{2} (7,500 mi^{2})
- Countries: South Africa

Conservation
- Conservation status: Critical/endangered

The Maputaland–Pondoland bushland and thickets is one of the ecoregions of South Africa. It consists of the montane shrubland biome.

== Geography ==
The ecoregion occupies the foothills of the Drakensberg mountains, covering an area of 19,500 square kilometers (7,500 sq mi) in South Africa's Eastern Cape and KwaZulu-Natal provinces. It is bounded on the east by the KwaZulu-Cape coastal forest mosaic, which lies in the humid coastal strip along the Indian Ocean; to the west it is bounded by the higher-elevation Drakensberg montane grasslands, woodlands and forests. To the south, it transitions to the drier Albany thickets, which are characterized by more succulent and spiny plants.

== Climate ==
The ecoregion experiences a dry subtropical climate characterised by varying rainfall levels, ranging from 1200 mm to 800 mm per year. 60% of its rainfall occurs during the summer.

== Flora ==
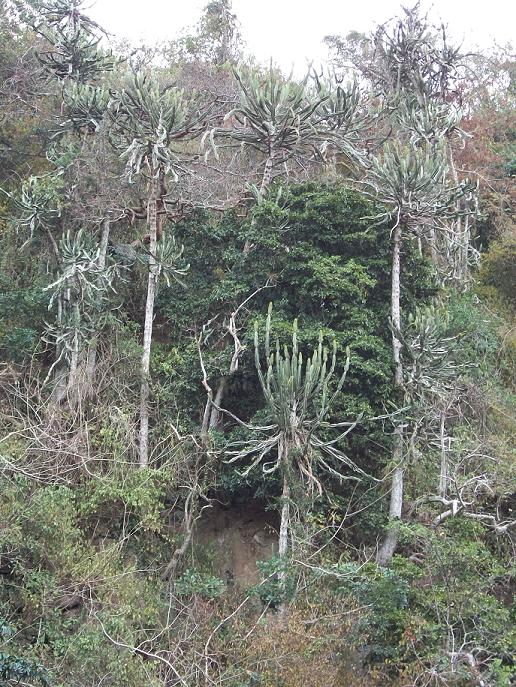
Euphorbias in valley bushveld

The typical vegetation is of the semi-succulent type, which are densely packed and up to three meters in height. The ecoregion, which is in a transition between moist and dry, montane and lowland, and temperate and tropical, has a rich diversity of species, with many endemics.

== Fauna ==
The ecoregion is home to a variety of animal species, including endangered black rhinos (Diceros bicornis) and white rhinos (Ceratotherium simum).

== Protected areas ==
A 1994 survey found that about 7.5% of the ecoregion is in protected areas. Protected areas include the Great Fish River Nature Reserve, Oribi Gorge Nature Reserve, and Thomas Baines Nature Reserve.

== See also ==
- Maputaland-Pondoland-Albany Hotspot – Southern Africa biodiversity hotspot
- Maputaland – Natural region in South Africa in northern KwaZulu-Natal
- EmaMpondweni, also known as Pondoland
- Wild Coast – Section of the coast of the Eastern Cape, South Africa
