= Peripatopsis collarium =

Scientific classification
- Kingdom: Animalia
- Phylum: Onychophora
- Family: Peripatopsidae
- Genus: Peripatopsis
- Species: P. collarium

Binomial name
- Peripatopsis collarium Barnes & Daniels, 2024

Species of velvet worm

Peripatopsis collarium is a species of velvet worm in the Peripatopsidae family. Also known as the white collar velvet worm, this species is a point endemic known only from a small sample found in the Van Stadens Wild Flower Reserve in South Africa. The species name of P. collarium refers to a distinctive white head collar present in all specimens of this velvet worm. This species was discovered as a clade within the Peripatopsis sedgwicki species complex.

== Discovery ==
This species was first described in 2024 by the zoologists Aaron Barnes and Savel R. Daniels of Stellenbosch University in South Africa. They discovered this species as a result of a phylogenetic analysis of the P. sedgwicki species complex using molecular data. They based the original description of this species on a female holotype and two paratypes (one male and one female) that they collected in 2019. They found these three specimens as well as another male specimen inside or under decaying indigenous logs in the Van Stadens Wild Flower Reserve in the Eastern Cape province in South Africa. The type specimens are deposited in the South African Museum.

== Phylogeny ==
Using molecular data, Barnes and Daniels identified this species as one of four clades in the P. sedgwicki species complex. Each clade represents a separate species, each with a different geographic distribution in South Africa. The molecular evidence indicates that the species P. orientalis is the closest relative of P. collarium. The closely related species P. orientalis is also close in terms of geography, with a range that surrounds the type locality of P. collarium. These two species form a sister group for P. sedgwicki s.s. (sensu stricto, that is, as narrowly understood), which emerges as the next closest relative. The species P. sedgwicki s.s. is found in a narrow range in the Western Cape province, more distant from the type locality of P. collarium. Finally, these three species form a sister group for the fourth species, P. margaritarius, which appears on the most basal branch of a phylogenetic tree in this species complex. The species P. margaritarius is a point endemic found only in the Fort Fordyce Nature Reserve in the Eastern Cape province, with a range isolated from the other three species.

== Description ==
All specimens of P. collarium feature a prominent white head collar that is absent in the other three species in the P. sedgwicki species complex. The dorsal surface of P. collarium varies from blue-grey and slate grey to orange or dark brown, whereas the ventral surface is white. When preserved, however, the dorsal color fades to a dark purple, the ventral surface turns pink, and the lateral surfaces become purple.

All four specimens of this species feature 20 pairs of legs. The males range from 19 mm to 28 mm in length and from 4.6 mm to 5.2 mm in width. The females range from 26 mm to 29 mm in length and from 5.5 mm to 5.9 mm in width. The male genital opening is cruciform, and the female genital opening is a horizontal and small vertical slit.

The integument features dome-shaped dermal papillae on the dorsal surface. The primary dorsal papillae have ten scale ranks, whereas the dorsal accessory papillae have five scale ranks. The ventral papillae are shaped like low pyramids with concentrated scale ridges. The primary ventral papillae have six scale ranks.

This species shares many traits with other velvet worms in the genus Peripatopsis. These shared traits include features considered characteristic for the genus, such as a cruciform genital opening in the male and variable color. This species shares more traits with the other three species in the P. sedgwicki species complex. For example, all four species feature not only identical accessory papillae on the ventral surface but also a female genital opening that takes the form of a horizontal and small vertical slit.

Furthermore, P. collarium features specimens of each sex with 20 leg pairs, like its two closest relatives, P. sedgwicki s.s. and P. orientalis. Both P. sedgwicki and P. orientalis can have either 19 or 20 leg pairs, unlike the more distant relative P. margaritarius, which ranges from 21 to 23 leg pairs. Moreover, P. collarium features dorsal accessory papillae with five scale ranks, like its closest relative P. orientalis and unlike the more distant relatives P. sedgwicki s.s. and P. margaritarius, which feature only four scale ranks on these papillae.

The species P. collarium can be distinguished from its closest relatives based on other traits. For example, P. collarium features a white head collar that is absent in all other clades of the P. sedgwicki species complex. Furthermore, the dorsal primary papillae in P. collarium features ten scale ranks, unlike these papillae in P. orientalis (with only nine scale ranks), P. sedgwicki s.s. (with eight scale ranks), and P. margaritarius (with seven scale ranks).
