= Game drive =

Game drive may refer to:

- Game drive system, a hunting strategy
- Game drive (Wildlife tourism), viewing wildlife from a vehicle
