= Mpofu Nature Reserve =

Nature reserve in the Amatole district of the Eastern Cape Province, South Africa

- Location within Eastern Cape
- Location: Eastern Cape, South Africa
- Nearest city: Balfour
- Coordinates: 32°37′16″S 26°35′28″E
- Area: 7,500 ha (19,000 acres)
- Governing body: Eastern Cape Parks
- Website: www.ecparks.co.za/parks-reserves/mpofu/index.html

Mpofu Nature Reserve is a nature reserve in the Amatole district of the Eastern Cape Province, South Africa that is managed by Eastern Cape Parks.

Mpofu is situated roughly 25 km (16 miles) northwest of Fort Beaufort and 20 km (12 miles) west of Balfour. It lies on the escarpment and lower valleys of the Katberg Mountains and covers 7,500 ha (19,000 acres) with altitudes varying from 550 to 1,384 metres (1,804 to 4,541 ft). The reserve was established in 1985 from land purchased from families who were descended from the 1820 settlers.

== Geography and Climate ==
Mpofu occupies the valleys and escarpments between the Katberg and Amatole mountain ranges. Some areas of the reserve are on steep terrain as a result. The reserve experiences its rainy season between November and March and summers are hot and humid. Autumn and winter are mainly dry and cool, and snowfalls occasionally occur on the surrounding mountain ranges. The nature reserve, like the rest of the Eastern Cape, is a malaria-free zone.

== Vegetation ==
The vegetation of the reserve comprises Grassland, Forest, and Albany Thicket biomes. Many species of flora found in these biomes are endemic to South Africa. Bush encroachment by Acacia karoo is currently a threat to the biodiversity of Mpofu nature reserve.

== Wildlife ==
There is a large variety of mammals found in the reserve including the endangered White Rhino. Other species include Burchell's zebra, Giraffe, Bushbuck, African Buffalo, Eland, and Black-backed jackal. The bird life is also diverse, and there are many insect and reptile species found in the reserve.

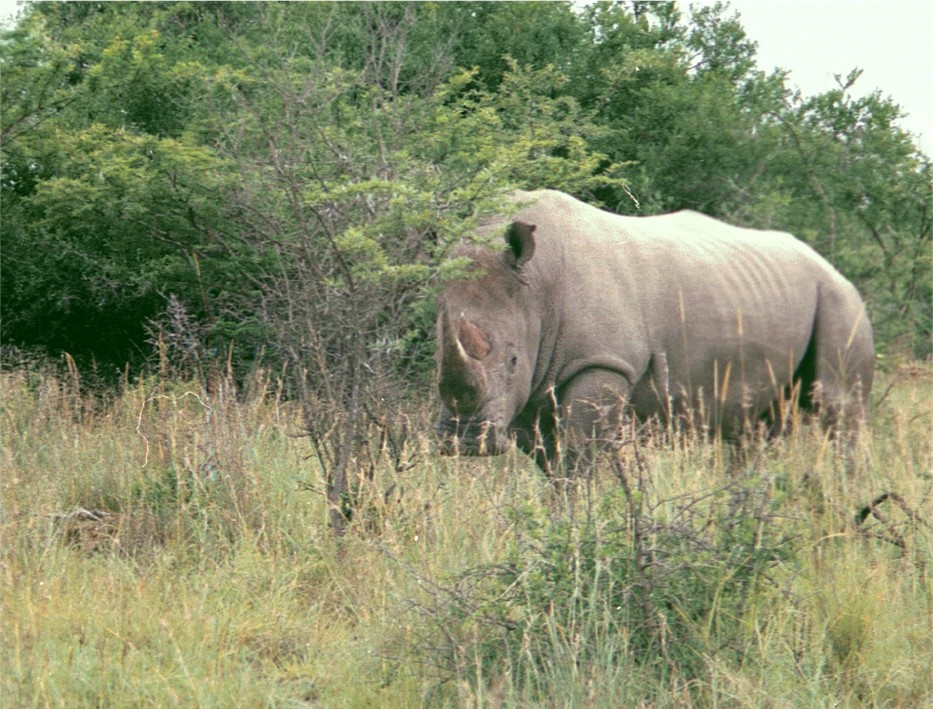
A White Rhino at the Mpofu Nature reserve

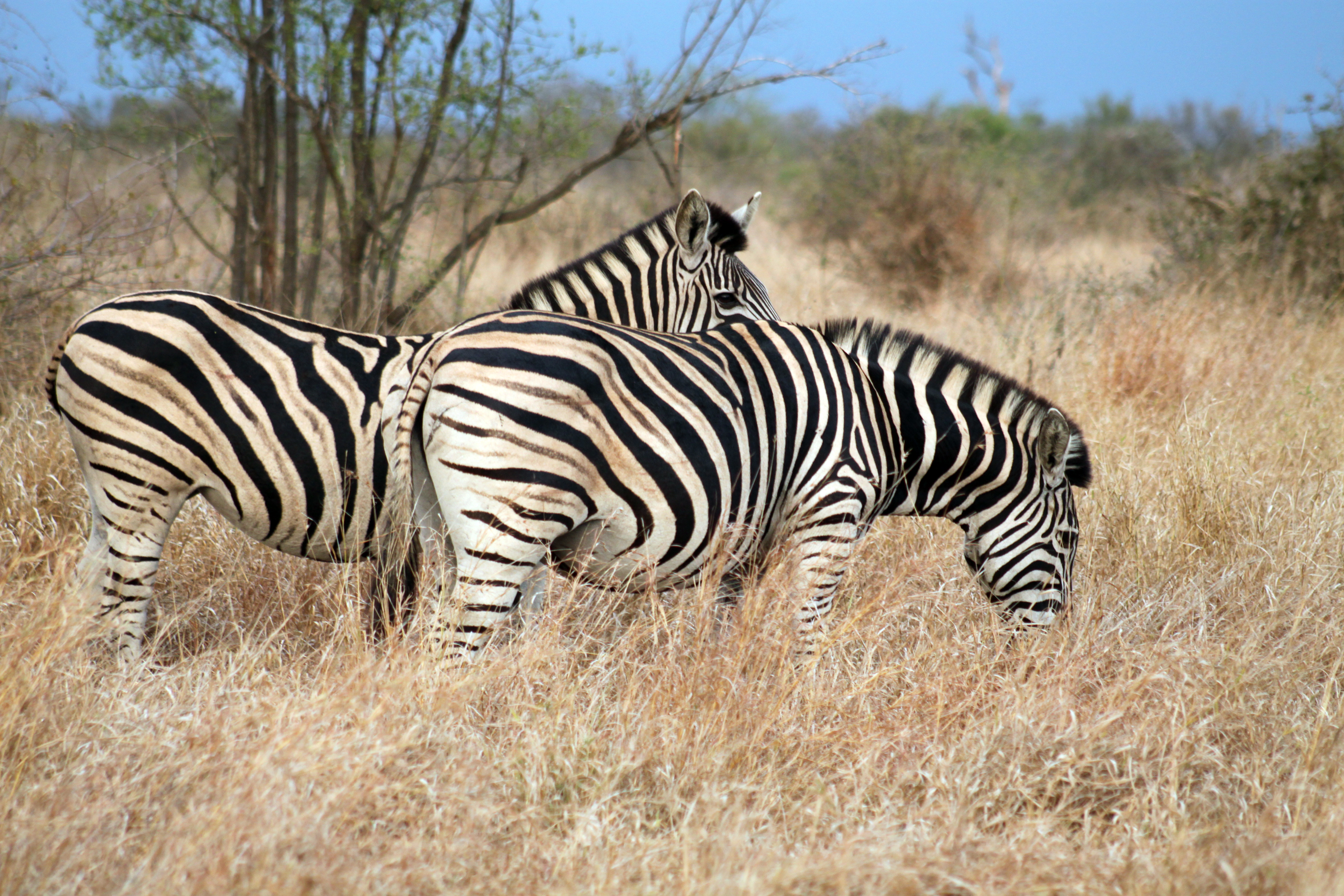
Burchell's zebra

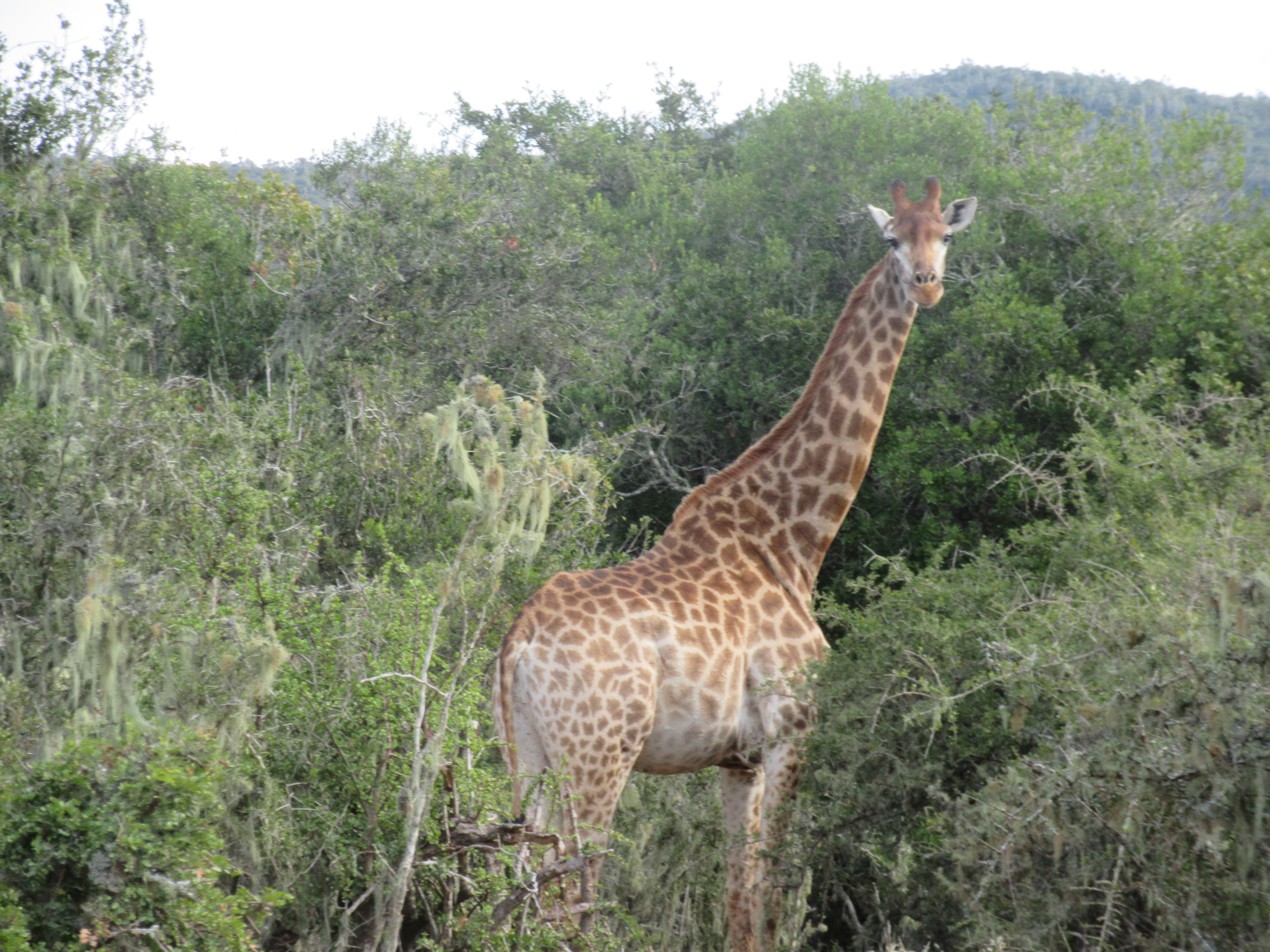
Cape giraffe

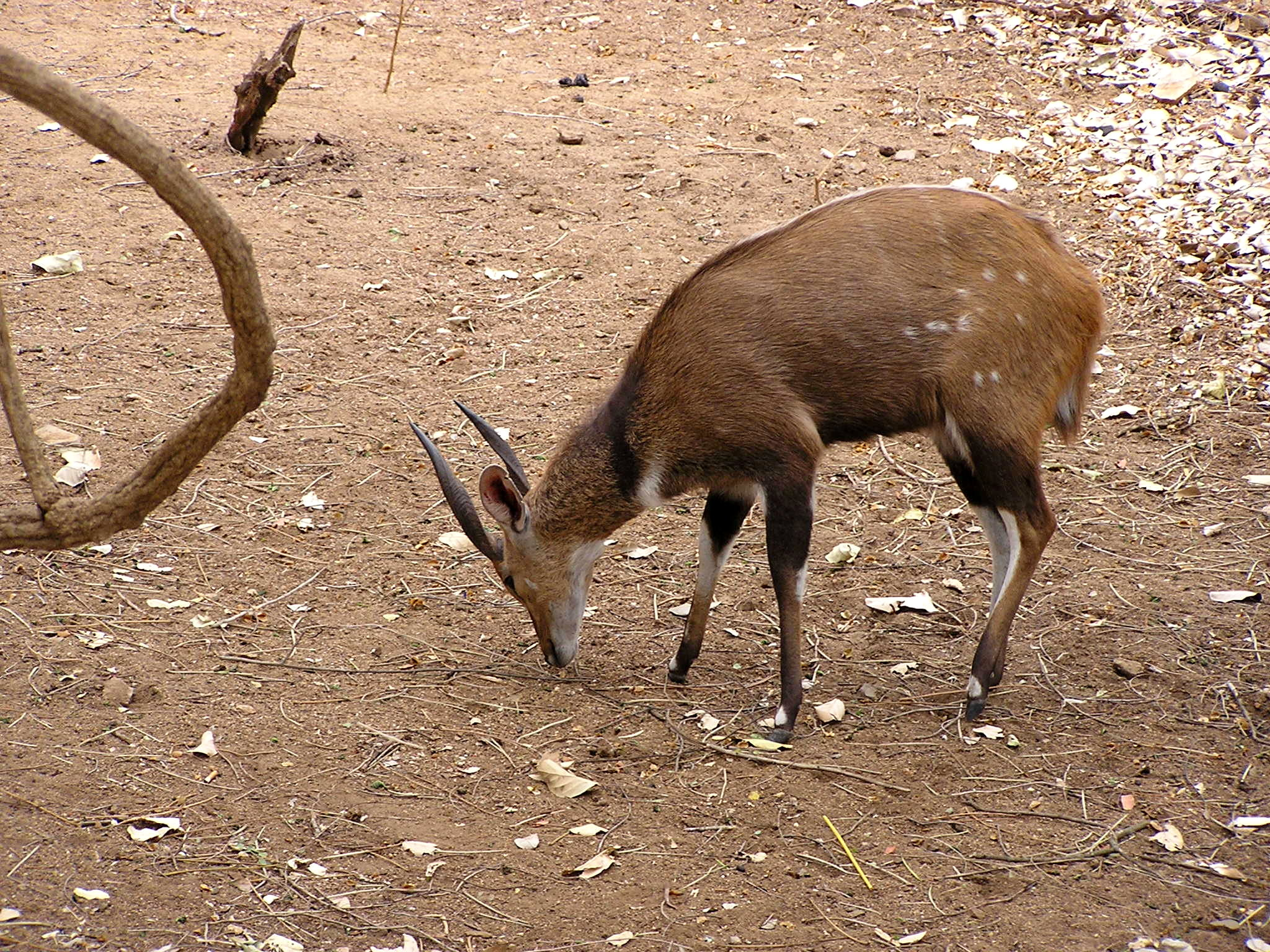
Bushbuck

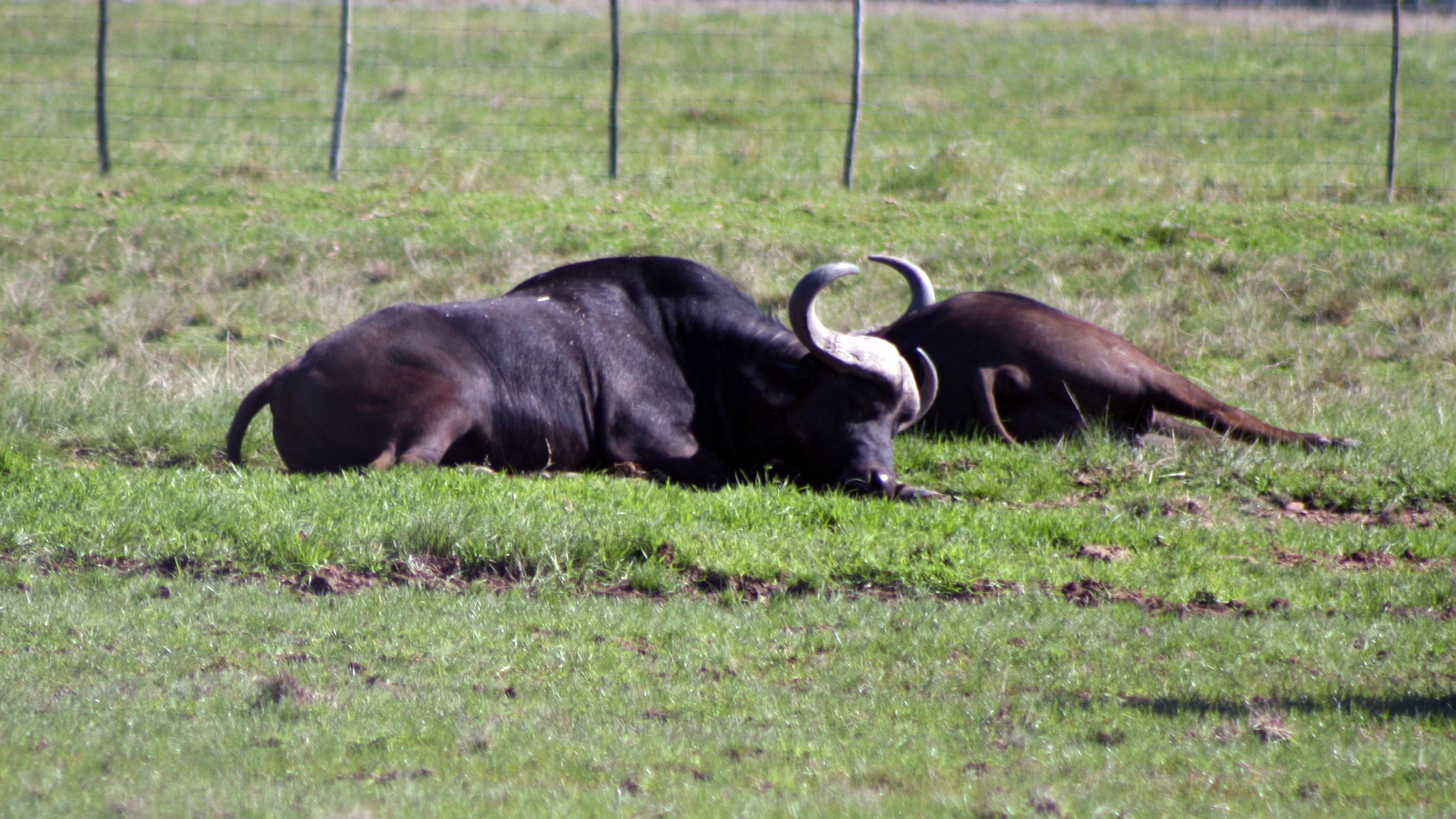
Cape Buffalo

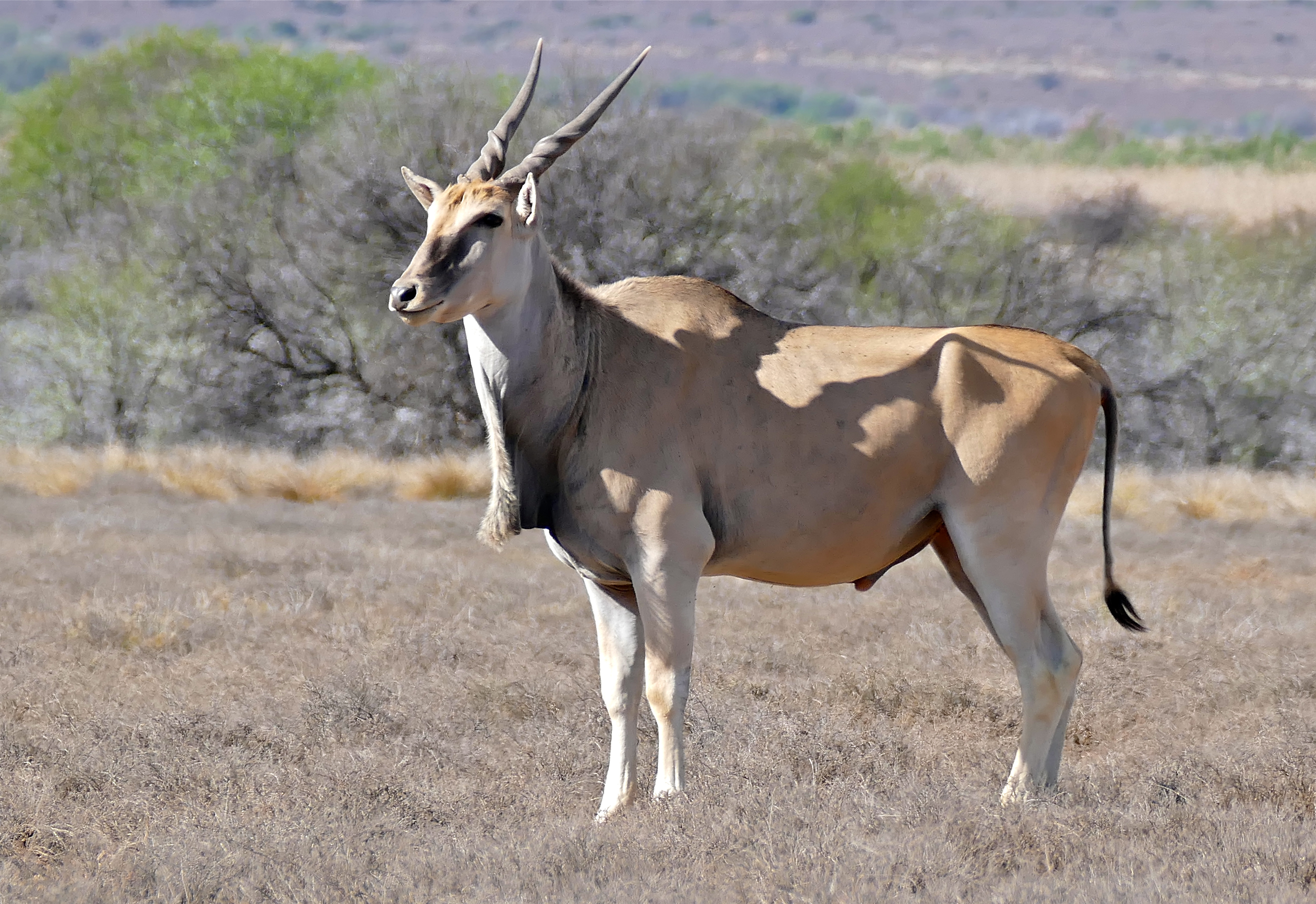
Eland

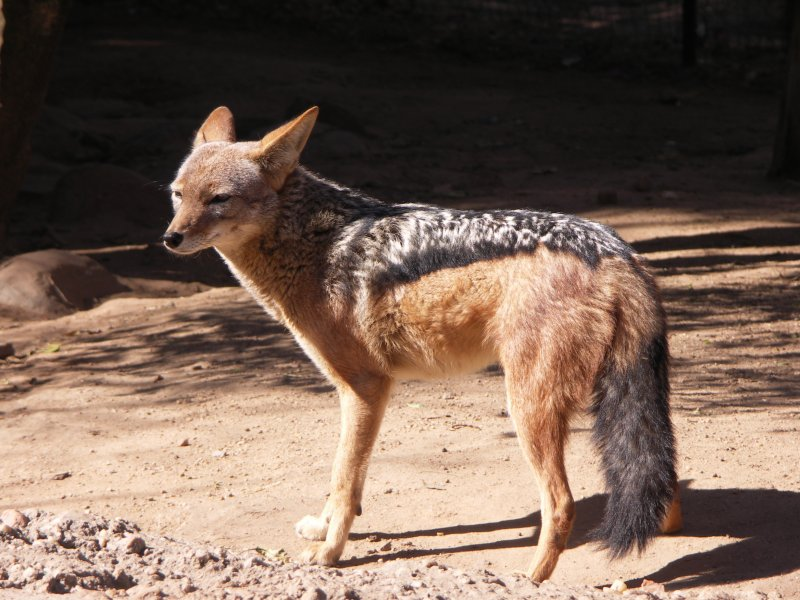
Black backed jackal

== Activities ==
The reserve hosts several hiking and walking trails, including the Katberg hiking trail. There is also bird watching, educational tours and game drives available. Nearby attractions include the mountain village, Hogsback, and Khoisan rock art in Waylands.

== Mountain Passes ==
There are three passes which traverse between the Mpofu Nature reserve and the Fort Fordyce Nature Reserves:

=== Blinkwater Pass ===
The Blinkwater Pass is a 19 kilometre gravel pass which goes northward up the Amathola escarpment across the reserve. The entrance to this pass is free, however, there are gated control points. This is the longest of the three local passes that traverse the Mpofu and Fort Fordyce Nature Reserves.

=== Fuller's Hoek Pass ===
Fuller's Hoek Pass lies off the R67 northwest of Fort Beaufort within the Fort Fordyce Nature Reserve. It is 8 km in length and has many curves and bends. The road passes rare afromontane forest. Snow often falls in this area during the winter.

=== Bosnek Pass ===
The Bosnek Pass is a 9 km gravel pass. The altitude variance is 418 metres and the summit is at a height of 1121 metres. The road is engineered with a 1:8 gradient. The road is subject to washaways and corrugation.

== Mythology ==
The Blinkwater Monster is said to visit the reserve regularly. The Blinkwater Monster refers to a fossil of Pareiasaurus serridens, a mammal-like reptile, which was named and discovered by Andrew Geddes Bain, a geologist and palaeontologist who discovered many fossils in the areas surrounding the reserve. He was awarded £200 by the British government in 1845 for his research.

== See also ==
- Maria Moroka Nature Reserve
- QwaQwa National Park – National park in South Africa
- South African National Parks – Body responsible for managing South Africa's national parks
- List of protected areas of South Africa
