= Peripatopsis margaritarius =

Scientific classification
- Kingdom: Animalia
- Phylum: Onychophora
- Family: Peripatopsidae
- Genus: Peripatopsis
- Species: P. margaritarius

Binomial name
- Peripatopsis margaritarius Barnes & Daniels, 2024

Species of velvet worm

Peripatopsis margaritarius is a species of velvet worm in the Peripatopsidae family. Also known as the Fort Fordyce velvet worm, this species is a point endemic found only in the Fort Fordyce Nature Reserve in South Africa. This species was discovered as a clade within the Peripatopsis sedgwicki species complex. This velvet worm can have from 21 to 23 pairs of legs, unlike the other three species in the P. sedgwicki species complex, which have only 19 or 20 leg pairs.

== Discovery ==
This species was first described in 2024 by the zoologists Aaron Barnes and Savel R. Daniels of Stellenbosch University in South Africa. They discovered this species as a result of a phylogenetic analysis of the P. sedgwicki species complex using molecular data. They based the original description of this species on a female holotype and 25 paratypes (including thirteen females and eight males). Danels found these specimens in 2016 inside or under decaying indigenous logs in patches of Afrotemperate forest in the Fort Fordyce Nature Reserve, on a high plateau in the Eastern Cape province of South Africa. The type specimens are deposited in the South African Museum. This species is named in honor of the biologist Margaretha Hofmeyr of the University of the Western Cape.

== Phylogeny ==
Using molecular data, Barnes and Daniels identified this species as one of four clades in the P. sedgwicki species complex. Each clade represents a separate species, each with a different geographic distribution in South Africa. The molecular evidence places P. margaritarius on the most basal branch of a phylogenetic tree in this species complex, with the other three species, P. sedgwicki s.s. (sensu stricto, that is, as narrowly understood), P. orientalis, and P. collarium, forming a sister group. The species P. margaritarius is found only in the Fort Fordyce Nature Reserve in the interior of the Eastern Cape province, with a range isolated from the other three species.

== Description ==
The species P. margaritarius can have from 21 to 23 pairs of legs. Specimens range from 15 mm to 46 mm in length and from 3.0 mm to 7.0 mm in width, but the male specimens reach a smaller maximum size, only 31 mm in length and 5.4 mm in width. The male genital opening is cruciform, and the female genital opening is a horizontal and small vertical slit.

The dorsal surface varies from dark brown to black, whereas the ventral surface is white. When preserved, however, the lateral surfaces become orange, and the legs turn blue. The integument on the dorsal surface features dermal papillae that are pyramidal or shaped like domes. The dorsal primary papillae are moderately spaced and feature seven scale ranks. The dorsal accessory papillae feature only four scale ranks. The ventral papillae are moderately spaced and shaped like low-rise pyramids. The ventral primary papillae feature seven scale ranks.

This species shares many traits with other velvet worms in the genus Peripatopsis. These shared traits include features considered characteristic for the genus, such as a cruciform genital opening in the male and variable color. This species shares more traits with the other three species in the P. sedgwicki species complex. For example, all four species feature not only identical accessory papillae on the ventral surface but also a female genital opening that takes the form of a horizontal and small vertical slit.

The species P. margaritarius can be distinguished from its closest relatives based on other traits. For example, P. margaritarius has 21 to 23 leg pairs, whereas the other three species have either 19 or 20 leg pairs. Furthermore, the dorsal primary papillae in P. margaritarius feature seven scale ranks, unlike these papillae in P. collarium (with ten scale ranks), P. orientalis (with nine scale ranks), and P. sedgwicki s.s. (with eight scale ranks).
