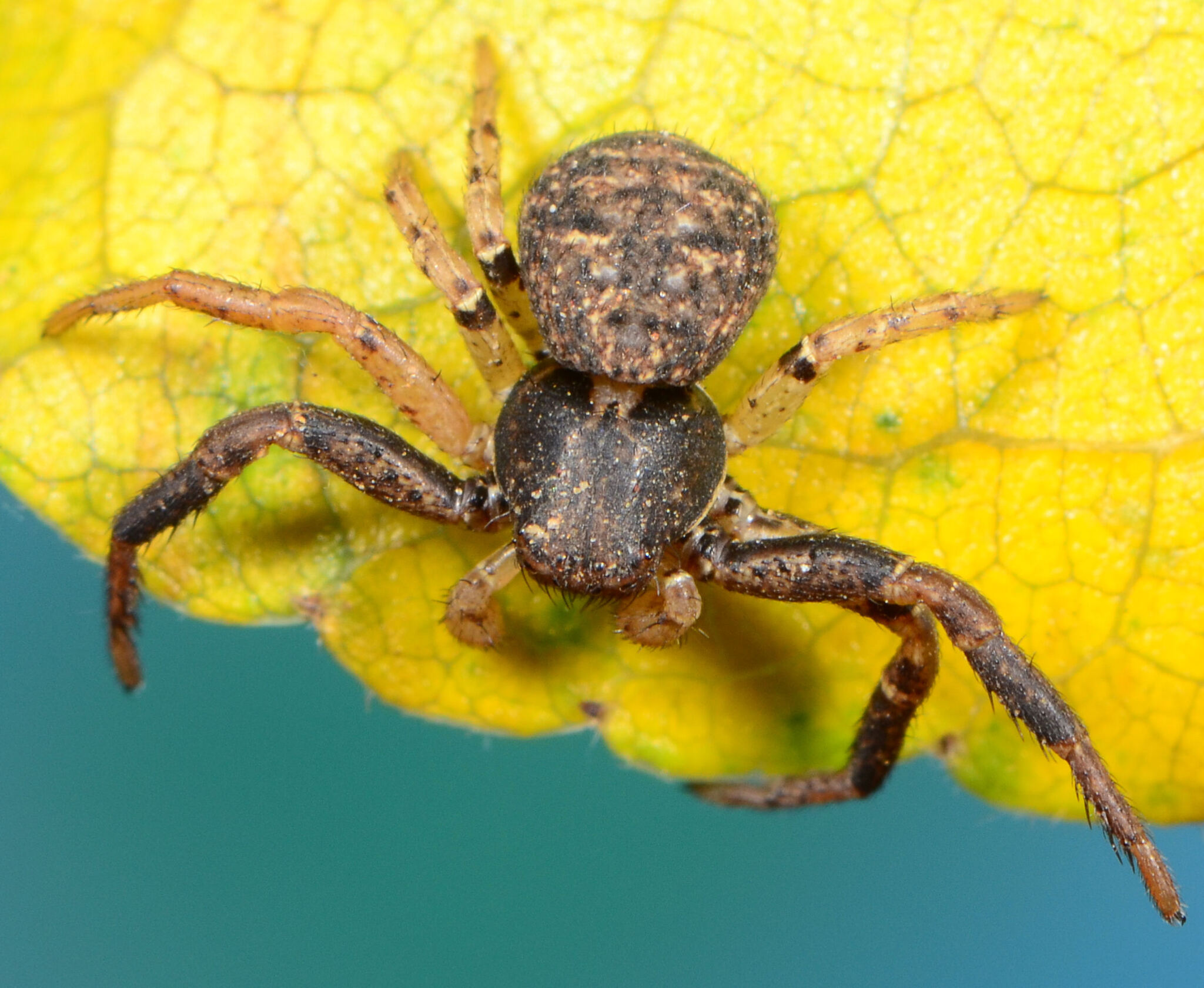
- Juvenile male
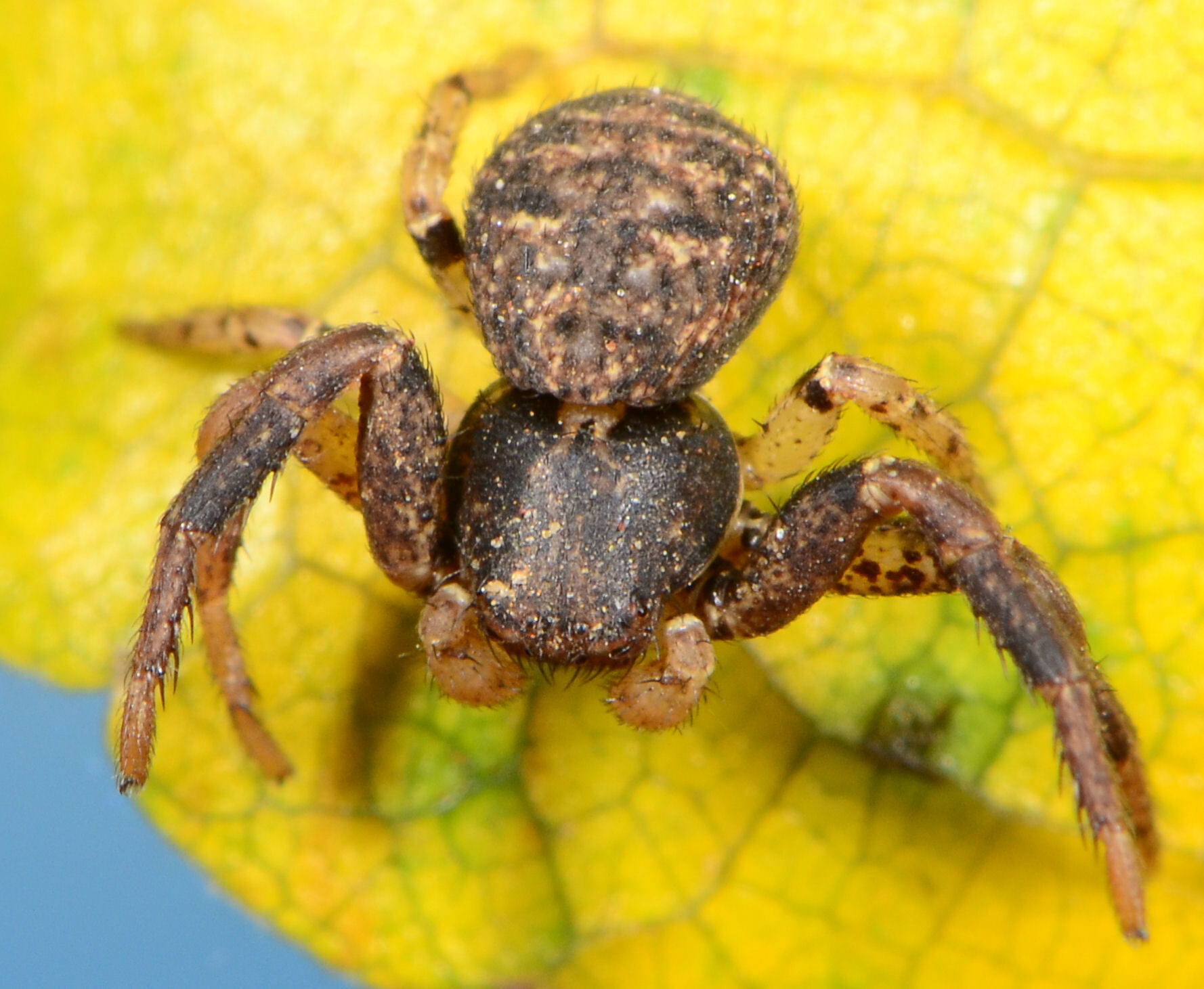
- juvenile male

Scientific classification
- Kingdom: Animalia
- Phylum: Arthropoda
- Subphylum: Chelicerata
- Class: Arachnida
- Order: Araneae
- Infraorder: Araneomorphae
- Family: Thomisidae
- Genus: Xysticus
- Species: X. mulleri

Binomial name
- Xysticus mulleri Lawrence, 1952

= Xysticus mulleri =

Muller's Xysticus Ground Crab Spider

Species of spider

Xysticus mulleri is a species of spider in the family Thomisidae. It occurs in Lesotho, Eswatini, and South Africa, and is commonly known as Muller's xysticus ground crab spider.

== Distribution ==
Xysticus mulleri occurs across three southern African countries: Lesotho, Swaziland (now Eswatini), and South Africa. In South Africa, the species is distributed across six provinces: Eastern Cape, Limpopo, KwaZulu-Natal, Mpumalanga, Northern Cape, and North West. The species occurs at altitudes ranging from 279 to 2,985 m above sea level.

Notable South African locations include Resolution farm in Albany District, Fort Fordyce Nature Reserve, Springbok Flats, Lephahlale, Newcastle, Sani Pass, Verloren Vallei Nature Reserve, Steenkampsberg, Tswalu Kalahari Reserve, and Kgaswane Mountain Reserve.

== Habitat and ecology ==
Xysticus mulleri are ground dwellers that inhabit grassland, savanna, and thicket biomes.

== Conservation ==
Xysticus mulleri is listed as Least Concern by the South African National Biodiversity Institute due to its wide geographical range. The species is protected in four protected areas, Fort Fordyce Nature Reserve, Verloren Vallei Nature Reserve, Tswalu Kalahari Reserve, and Kgaswane Mountain Reserve.

== Taxonomy ==
The species was originally described by Reginald Frederick Lawrence in 1952 from Newcastle in KwaZulu-Natal. African species of Xysticus have not been revised. The species is known only from the female, and more sampling is needed to collect the male.
