= Peripatopsis orientalis =

Scientific classification
- Kingdom: Animalia
- Phylum: Onychophora
- Family: Peripatopsidae
- Genus: Peripatopsis
- Species: P. orientalis

Binomial name
- Peripatopsis orientalis Barnes & Daniels, 2024

Species of velvet worm

Peripatopsis orientalis is a species of velvet worm in the Peripatopsidae family. This species was discovered as one of four clades within the Peripatopsis sedgwicki species complex. Each clade represents a separate species, each with a different geographic distribution in South Africa. The species P. orientalis has the broadest distribution among the four species in this species complex. The specific name refers to the relatively eastern distribution of this species within this species complex.

== Discovery ==
This species was first described in 2024 by the zoologists Aaron Barnes and Savel R. Daniels of Stellenbosch University in South Africa. They discovered this species as a result of a phylogenetic analysis of the P. sedgwicki species complex using molecular data. They based the original description of this species on a female holotype and six paratypes (two females, two males, and two juveniles) that they collected in 2019 in Nature's Valley in South Africa. They also studied a large sample of additional specimens of this species found at 17 different sites, from as far west as Nature's Valley to as far east as Grahamstown in the Eastern Cape province. They found these specimens inside or under decaying indigenous logs. The type specimens are deposited in the South African Museum.

== Phylogeny ==
Using molecular data, Barnes and Daniels identified this species as one of four in the P. sedgwicki species complex. The molecular evidence indicates that the species P. collarium is the closest relative of P. orientalis. These close relatives are also close in terms of geography, as P. collarium is a point endemic confined to the Van Stadens Wild Flower Reserve, which is surrounded by the broader range of P. orientalis in the Eastern Cape province. These two species form a sister group for P. sedgwicki s.s. (sensu stricto, that is, as narrowly understood), which emerges as the next closest relative. The species P. sedgwicki s.s. is found in a narrow range in the Western Cape province. Finally, these three species form a sister group for the fourth species, P. margaritarius, which appears on the most basal branch of a phylogenetic tree in this species complex. The species P. margaritarius is a point endemic found only in the Fort Fordyce Nature Reserve in the Eastern Cape province, with a range isolated from the other three species.

== Description ==
The species P. orientalis can have either 19 or 20 pairs of legs, but usually has 20 leg pairs: Out of 17 different localities sampled for this species, all samples featured specimens with 20 leg pairs, and only four included specimens with 19 leg pairs. Specimens range from 9 mm to 33 mm in length. The male genital opening is cruciform, and the female genital opening is a horizontal and small vertical slit.

The dorsal surface of P. orientalis varies from dark blue to grey or orange, whereas the ventral surface is usually white but can also be light pink. When preserved, however, the dorsal color fades to a dark brown. The integument on the dorsal surface features dermal papillae that are conical or shaped like domes. The primary dorsal papillae are densely spaced and feature nine scale ranks. The ventral papillae are also densely spaced; their shape can be either conical or pyramidal.

This species shares many traits with other velvet worms in the genus Peripatopsis. These shared traits include features considered characteristic for the genus, such as a cruciform genital opening in the male and variable color. This species shares more traits with the other three species in the P. sedgwicki species complex. For example, all four species feature not only identical accessory papillae on the ventral surface but also a female genital opening that takes the form of a horizontal and small vertical slit.

Furthermore, P. orientalis includes specimens with 20 leg pairs, like its two closest relatives, P. sedgwicki s.s. and P. collarium. The species P. collarium is known from only a small sample in one locality, with 20 leg pairs recorded in four specimens (two males and two females). The species P. sedgwicki can have either 19 or 20 leg pairs, unlike the more distant relative P. margaritarius, which ranges from 21 to 23 leg pairs. Moreover, P. orientalis features dorsal accessory papillae with five scale ranks, like its closest relative P. collarium and unlike the more distant relatives P. sedgwicki s.s. and P. margaritarius, which feature only four scale ranks on these papillae.

The species P. orientalis can be distinguished from its closest relatives based on other traits. For example, P. collarium features a white head collar that is absent in P. orientalis. Furthermore, the dorsal primary papillae in P. orientalis features nine scale ranks, unlike these papillae in P. collarium (with ten scale ranks), P. sedgwicki s.s. (with eight scale ranks), and P. margaritarius (with seven scale ranks).
