= Peripatopsis sedgwicki =

Scientific classification
- Kingdom: Animalia
- Phylum: Onychophora
- Family: Peripatopsidae
- Genus: Peripatopsis
- Species: P. sedgwicki

Binomial name
- Peripatopsis sedgwicki Purcell, 1899

Synonyms
- Peripatus dewaali (Weber, 1898)

Species of velvet worm

Peripatopsis sedgwicki is a species of velvet worm in the Peripatopsidae family. Also known as the Tsitsikamma velvet worm, this species has a narrow geographic distribution in South Africa but is especially abundant in the indigenous forest of the Tsitsikamma mountains. Recent phylogenetic analysis using molecular data finds that Peripatopsis sedgwicki as traditionally understood based on morphology (sensu lato) is a species complex that contains four different species: P. sedgwicki s.s. (sensu stricto, that is, as more narrowly defined), P. orientalis, P. collarium, and P. margaritarius.

== Discovery ==
This velvet worm was first described under the name Peripatus dewaali by the Dutch zoologist Max Weber in 1898 based on specimens he collected near the town on Knysna in the Western Cape province of South Africa. In 1899, the South African zoologist William F. Purcell provided a more detailed description based on a male and eleven females that he found in 1896 in rotten wood in the forest and under heaps of weeds on farms near the town of Knysna. He named this species Peripatopsis sedgwicki for the British zoologist Adam Sedgwick. Although Peripatopsis sedgwicki is a junior synonym of Peripatus dewaali, authorities favor the name Peripatopsis sedgwicki based on its long usage, deeming Peripatus dewaali to be a nomen oblitum and designating Peripatopsis sedgwicki a nomen protectum.

== Taxonomic revision and distribution ==
In 2024, the zoologists Aaron Barnes and Savel R. Daniels conducted a phylogenetic study using molecular data from a large sample of specimens of Peripatopsis sedgwicki (sensu lato). They find that this species complex contains four clades, each representing a different species. Type specimens of each species are deposited in the South African Museum. Each of these species has a different geographic distribution within the range of this species complex in South Africa.

The species P. sedgwicki s.s. (that is, as narrowly understood) is endemic to a small area confined to the Afrotemperate forest of the Western Cape province near the original type locality Knysna. Given the absence of any original type material, Barnes and Daniels designate a female specimen as the neotype and three other female specimens as paraneotypes. These specimens were collected from the Diepwalle forest in Knysa. Other specimens in the same clade were collected in three nearby localities (the Homtini River in Rheenendal as well as Harkerville and the Garden of Eden in Plettenberg Bay).

The species P. orientalis has the broadest distribution within this species complex, ranging from Nature's Valley to Grahamstown in the Eastern Cape province. Barnes and Daniels base the original description of this species on a female holotype and six paratypes (including two males and two females). These specimens were collected in Nature's Valley. The specific name refers to the relatively eastern distribution of this species.

The species P. collarium is a point endemic found only in the Van Stadens Wild Flower Reserve in the Eastern Cape province. Barnes and Daniels based the original description of this species on a female holotype and two paratypes (one male and one female) found there. The molecular data indicate that this species is most closely related to P. orientalis and that these two species form a sister group for P. sedgwicki s.s.

The species P. margaritarius is a point endemic found only in the Fort Fordyce Nature Reserve on a high plateau in the interior of the Eastern Cape province. Barnes and Daniels base the original description of this species on a female holotype and 25 paratypes (including thirteen females and eight males) found there. Phylogenetic analysis of this species complex places this species on the most basal branch of a phylogenetic tree, with the other three species forming a sister group. This species is named in honor of the biologist Margaretha Hofmeyr of the University of the Western Cape.

== Description ==
Although Purcell originally described Peripatopsis sedgwicki with 20 pairs of legs, which was long considered characteristic of this species, more recent studies find that velvet worms in the P. sedgwicki species complex can have as few as 19 or as many as 23 leg pairs. Leg number is diagnostic for the Fort Fordyce species P. margaritarius, which features 21 to 23 leg pairs, as only 19 or 20 leg pairs are recorded elsewhere in the rest of the species complex. For example, P. sedgwicki s.s. can have either 19 or 20 leg pairs in most localities. Although 20 leg pairs are usually observed in P. orientalis, some localities (four out of 17 localities sampled) yielded samples of this species with 19 pairs as well as 20 pairs. Finally, P. collarium is known from only a small sample in one locality, with 20 leg pairs recorded in four specimens (two males and two females).

All specimens of P. collarium feature a prominent white head collar that is absent in the other three species. The name P. collarium refers to this diagnostic trait. Color is otherwise highly variable in this species complex, even within a single clade, with the ventral surface varying from white to light pink and the dorsal colors ranging from dark blue, grey, or brown to bright orange or red. Thus, coloration proves to be generally unreliable as a basis for distinguishing among clades within this species complex.

Although gross morphology is of limited use in identifying individual species within this species complex, scanning electron microscopy reveals diagnostic differences beyond those noted above. For example, each species features a different number of scale ranks on the dorsal primary papillae, with seven in P. margaritarius, eight in P. sedgwicki s.s., nine in P. orientalis, and ten in P. collarium. In terms of gross morphology, however, the velvet worms in this species complex generally share the features associated with P. sedgwicki (sensu lato) as described below.

These velvet worms are relatively large: Females range in size from 12 mm to 68 mm in length, whereas males range from 10 mm to 46 mm in length. The outer blade of the jaw may have only one accessory tooth or no such tooth, and rarely may have two such teeth. The inner blade of the jaw features four to seven accessory teeth. The male genital opening is cruciform, and the female genital opening is a horizontal and small vertical slit.

The last leg pair (the genital pair) features claws, like those on the pregenital pairs, and is well developed compared to those in some other species in the genus Peripatopsis. The last leg pair, however, is smaller than the preceding leg pair and reduced more in the male than in the female. Each leg feature three or four spinous pads except for the last leg pair, which feature only one to three pads on each leg. The feet also feature three distal papillae (two anterior and one posterior).

These velvet worms share many traits with other species in the genus Peripatopsis. These shared traits include features considered characteristic for the genus, such as the reduced last (genital) leg pair, feet with three distal papillae (two anterior and one posterior), the cruciform genital opening in the male, and variable color. In 2009, a phylogenetic analysis of Peripatopsis species using molecular data found P. sedgwicki (sensu lato) to be most closely related to P. moseleyi, which has also since been found to be a species complex. Like the velvet worms in the P. moseleyi species complex, those in the P. sedgwicki species complex do not curl up into a spiral when initially exposed.

The velvet worms in the P. sedgwicki species complex can be distinguished from their close relatives in the P. moseleyi species complex based on marked differences in the last leg pair. This leg pair in the P. sedgwicki species complex is relatively well developed and features claws in both sexes, whereas this leg pair in the P. moseleyi species complex is rudimentary and reduced to mere tubercles. At most, this leg pair in the P. moseleyi species complex may feature a single claw (never two) on one or two of these legs in the female.

== Reproduction and life cycle ==
Like other velvet worms in the genus Peripatopsis, those in the P. sedgwicki species complex exhibit matrotrophic viviparity, that is, mothers in this genus retain eggs in their uteri and supply nourishment to their embryos, but without any placenta. Females in the P. sedgwicki species complex produce eggs with almost no yolk, and embryos develop large "trophic organs" or "trophic vesicles" that may function as means to absorb nourishment from the mother. The female gives birth to her first batch of young when she is about two years old. About a month before the birth of each batch, the next batch of eggs are fertilized. The young reach their maximum size when they are about three years old. These velvet worms have a life span of about six to seven years.
