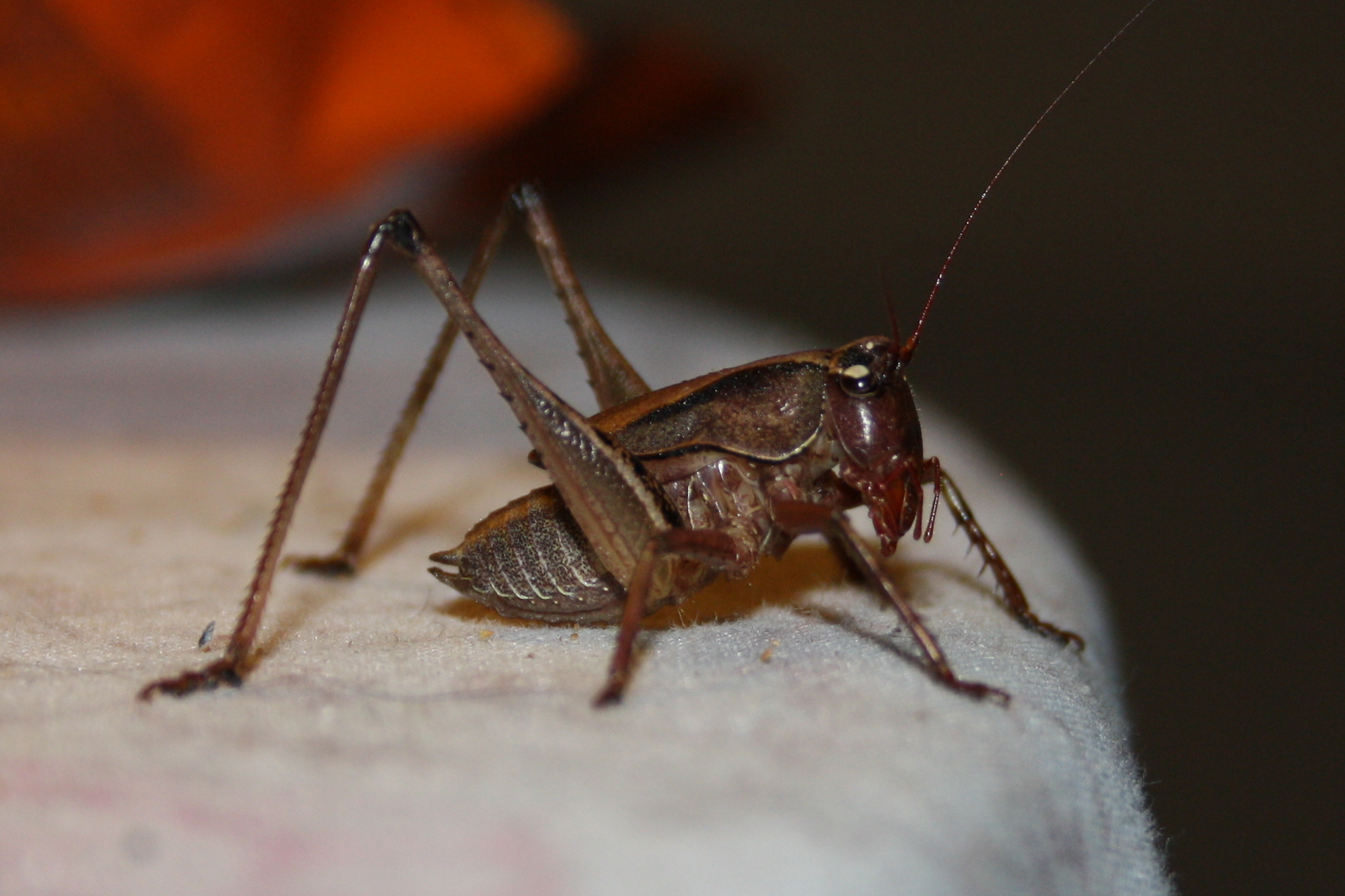
- Alfredectes semiaeneus in George, Western Cape

Conservation status
- Least Concern (IUCN 3.1)

Scientific classification
- Domain: Eukaryota
- Kingdom: Animalia
- Phylum: Arthropoda
- Class: Insecta
- Order: Orthoptera
- Suborder: Ensifera
- Family: Tettigoniidae
- Genus: Alfredectes
- Species: A. semiaeneus

Binomial name
- Alfredectes semiaeneus (Serville, 1838)

Synonyms
- Thyreonotus semi-aeneus Serville, 1838

= Alfredectes semiaeneus =

Species of cricket-like animal

Alfredectes semiaeneus, or Alfred's shieldback, is a species of katydid that is widespread in the Western Cape and Eastern Cape of South Africa. It is found in lowland and coastal fynbos, up to 1400 m elevation. It is threatened with habitat destruction, but can be found in protected areas such as Baviaanskloof Mega Reserve and Tsitsikamma National Park.
