= Thomas Baines Nature Reserve =

Nature reserve in Eastern Cape, South Africa, near Grahamstown

- Location within Eastern Cape
- Location: Eastern Cape, South Africa
- Nearest city: Grahamstown
- Coordinates: 33.3910°S 26.487°E
- Area: 1,005 ha (2,480 acres)
- Established: 1961; 65 years ago
- Administrator: Eastern Cape Parks
- Website: visiteasterncape.co.za/parks/thomas-baines/

Thomas Baines Nature Reserve is a 1,005-hectare (2,480-acre) nature reserve in the Eastern Cape, South Africa that is managed by Eastern Cape Parks. It was created as a municipal reserve in 1961 and upgraded to a provincial reserve in 1980. It is named after the artist and explorer Thomas Baines who recorded the region's flora and fauna.

The northern shore of the Settlers Dam forms the southern boundary of the reserve.

== Fauna ==
Mammals found within the reserve are:

- African buffalo
- Chacma baboon
- Common eland
- Greater kudu
- Oribi
- Red hartebeest
- Vervet monkey
- Warthog
- Zebra

Besides these mammals, 175 bird species have been recorded in the park.

== Flora ==
Along with fynbos vegetation, the reserve contains Albany thicket woodland.

== Activities ==
There are various featured activities found within the park such as game drives, canoeing, camping, bird watching, sailing, bass fishing, environmental education and hiking.

== See also ==
- South African National Parks – Body responsible for managing South Africa's national parks
- List of protected areas of South Africa
