= Samara Private Game Reserve =

Private game reserve near Graaff-Reinet in the Eastern Cape, South Africa

Samara Private Game Reserve is a 28,300 hectare private game reserve, located near Graaff-Reinet in the Eastern Cape, South Africa. Previously a network of 11 livestock farms, Samara was created in 1997 with the vision to restore the area to its natural state. This is being achieved by slowly rehabilitating the land and reintroducing the natural biodiversity. The South African cheetahs are at the forefront of Samara's conservation initiatives, and forms part of the Cheetah Metapopulation Programme, managed by the Endangered Wildlife Trust.

== Research projects ==
Samara promotes research on the reserve, and is currently supporting the following research projects:

- Cheetah and Jackal research, through the Centre for African Carnivore Ecology at Nelson Mandela Metropolitan University
- Vervet monkey research through the University of the Witwatersrand and the University of Lethbridge.

== Tracker Academy ==
Samara is home to South Africa's first Tracker Academy, aimed at teaching outstanding underprivileged individuals the art of tracking. Samara Volunteer Programme is also based on the property, aimed at giving individuals the opportunity to contribute to hands-on conservation.

== Vuyani Safe Haven ==
Samara supports Vuyani Safe Haven as its community initiative.

== See also ==
- Eastern Cape Parks
- Protected areas of South Africa
