= Silaka Nature Reserve =

Nature reserve in Eastern Cape Province, South Africa, near Port St Johns

- Location within Eastern Cape
- Location: Wild Coast, Eastern Cape, South Africa
- Nearest city: Port St Johns
- Coordinates: 31°39′11″S 29°30′29″E

Location of Silaka N.R. in South Africa.

Silaka Nature Reserve is a nature reserve in Eastern Cape Province, South Africa, close to the town of Port St Johns, and managed by Eastern Cape Parks. The park has a small area, only 400 ha, featuring grassland and magnificent indigenous coastal forests. It lies about 7 km south of the town of Port St Johns.

== See also ==
- South African National Parks – Body responsible for managing South Africa's national parks
- List of protected areas of South Africa
