= Dwesa-Cwebe Marine Protected Area =

Coastal marine conservation area in the Eastern Cape, South Africa

- Dwesa-Cwebe MPA location
- Location: Eastern Cape province, South Africa
- Nearest city: between East London and Port St Johns
- Coordinates: 32°19.92′S 28°58.11′E
- Area: 199 km^{2} (77 sq mi)
- Established: 1989
- Governing body: Eastern Cape Parks and Tourism Agency
- Dwesa-Cwebe Marine Protected Area (South Africa)

The Dwesa-Cwebe Marine Protected Area is an inshore and offshore conservation region, off the coast of the Dwesa-Cwebe Nature Reserve in the Eastern Cape province, in the territorial waters of South Africa.

== History ==
The area was initially declared as a marine reserve in 1989 by the Transkei government. The MPA was proclaimed by the Minister of Environmental Affairs and Tourism, Mohammed Valli Moosa, in Government Gazette No. 21948 of 29 December 2000 in terms section 43 of the Marine Living Resources Act, 18 of 1998. The extension was proclaimed by Bomo Edith Edna Molewa, Minister of Environmental Affairs under Section 22A of the National Environmental Management: Protected Areas Act, 2003 (Act No. 57 of 2003) to take effect on the 1 December 2015.

== Purpose ==
A marine protected area is defined by the IUCN as "A clearly defined geographical space, recognised, dedicated and managed, through legal or other effective means, to achieve the long-term conservation of nature with associated ecosystem services and cultural values".

The MPA was established to offer a crucial transition area between the Agulhas and Natal Ecoregions, offer safe passage between the Nqabaqa Estuary, the Suku Estuary, and the Mbashe Estuary. The area is a spawning ground for endangered white steenbras and is a juvenile nursery for dusky kob, among countless other invertebrates, fish, and marine animals.

== Extent ==
The MPA protect about 14 km of coastline and 193 km^{2} of sea area.

=== Boundaries ===
The original boundaries of the MPA as proclaimed in 2000 are:

- Inshore boundary is the high-water mark
- Offshore boundary is six nautical miles seawards of the high-water mark
- Northern boundary: A line at 135° true from the western bank of the mouth of the Suku River in the district of Elliotdale
- Southern boundary: A line at 135° true from Human's Rock in the district of Willowvale
- The tidal portion of the Mbashe River as far as the northwestern boundary of the Dwesa forest reserve and the south-western boundary of the Cwebe forest reserve.

The revised boundaries as proclaimed in 2015 are:

- Inshore boundary is the high-water mark between Human's Rock at S32°18.934′, E28°49.549′ and the Ntlonyane River mouth at S32°11.884′, E28°57.435′
- Offshore south-eastern boundary is about twelve nautical miles seawards of the high-water mark between S32°28.049′, E28°58.685′ and S32°20.831', E29°06.770′
- South-western boundary: A line at 135° from Human's Rock S32°18.934′, E28°49.549′ to S32°28.049′, E28°58.685′
- North-eastern boundary, a line drawn 135° from the Ntlonyane River mouth. S32°11.884′, E28°57.435′ to S32°20.831', E29°06.770′
- All tidal estuaries between Human's Rock and Ntlonyane River mouth are included as far upstream as the 5 m depth contour extends.

=== Zonation ===
In 2000 Dwesa-Cwebe was proclaimed as a no take MPA, but political pressure by the historical inhabitants led to a rezoning in November 2015 with three controlled fishing zones, subject to a small-scale or recreational fishing permit, and three restricted zones where no fishing is allowed.

==== Restricted areas ====
The Northern (inshore) restricted zone:

- Inshore boundary: From, but excluding the Mpenzu estuary, at S32°14.625′, E28°54.830′ to S32°16.830′, E28°52.692′, including the Mendu estuary, *Offshore boundary: 500 meters offshore from the high-water mark
- Estuarine border: The tidal portion of the Mbashe River upstream as far as the inland borders of the Dwesa and Cwebe forest reserves at S32°14.247′, E28°53.415′ and S32°13.693′, E28°51.677′

The Southern (inshore) restricted zone:

- Inshore border: From the Dwesa cliffs S32°17.732′, E28°51.454′ to the southern border of the Dwesa cliffs A5 S32°19.041°, E28°50.693′
- Offshore border: 500 meters offshore from the high-water mark

The offshore restricted zone:

- Inshore boundary: 500 meters offshore from the high-water mark
- Offshore boundary: The offshore boundaries of the MPA as proclaimed.

==== Controlled areas ====
The northern (inshore) controlled zone:

- Inshore boundary: From the tidal influence of the Ntlonyane estuary at S32°11.884′, E28°57.435′ to the tidal influence of the Mpenzu estuary at S32°16.830′, E28°52.692′
- Offshore boundary: 500 meters offshore from the high-water mark

The central (inshore) controlled zone:

- Inshore boundary: From the tidal influence of the Mendu estuary at A3 S32°16.830′, E28°52.692′ to the northern border of the Dwesa Cliffs at S32°17.732′, E28°51.454′
- Offshore boundary: 500 meters offshore from the high-water mark

The southern (inshore) controlled zone:

- Inshore boundary: From the southern border of the Dwesa Cliffs at S32°19.041°, E28°50.693′ to Human's Rock at S32°18.934′, E28°49.549′
- Offshore boundary: 500 meters offshore from the high-water mark

The tidal portion of all estuaries excluding the Mendu estuary and the lower reaches of the Mbashe estuary form part of the controlled zones.

== Management ==
The marine protected areas of South Africa are the responsibility of the national government, which has management agreements with a variety of MPA management authorities, in this case, Eastern Cape Parks and Tourism Agency, which manages the MPA with funding from the SA Government through the Department of Environmental Affairs (DEA).

The Department of Agriculture, Forestry and Fisheries is responsible for issuing permits, quotas and law enforcement.

== Uses ==
- Subsistence fishing by local inhabitants
- Nature-based tourism, which boosts the local economy

== Ecology ==
Marine ecoregions of the South African Exclusive Economic Zone: Dwesa-Cwebe Marine Protected Area is in the transition between the Agulhas and Natal ecoregions.

The MPA is in transition between the warm temperate Agulhas ecoregion to the east of Cape Point which extends eastwards to the Mbashe River and the sub-tropical Natal ecoregion. There are a large proportion of species endemic to South Africa along this coastline.

Three major habitats exist in the sea in this region, Two of them distinguished by the nature of the substrate. The substrate, or base material, is important in that it provides a base to which an organism can anchor itself, which is vitally important for those organisms which need to stay in one particular kind of place. Rocky shores and reefs provide a firm fixed substrate for the attachment of plants and animals. Sandy beaches and bottoms are a relatively unstable substrate and cannot anchor kelp or many of the other benthic organisms. Finally there is open water, above the substrate and clear of the kelp forest, where the organisms must drift or swim. Mixed habitats are also frequently found, which are a combination of those mentioned above.

Rocky shores and reefs There are rocky reefs and mixed rocky and sandy bottoms. For many marine organisms the substrate is another type of marine organism, and it is common for several layers to co-exist.

The type of rock of the reef is of some importance, as it influences the range of possibilities for the local topography, which in turn influences the range of habitats provided, and therefore the diversity of inhabitants. Sandstone and other sedimentary rocks erode and weather very differently, and depending on the direction of dip and strike, and steepness of the dip, may produce reefs which are relatively flat to very high profile and full of small crevices. These features may be at varying angles to the shoreline and wave fronts. There are fewer large holes, tunnels and crevices in sandstone reefs, but often many deep but low near-horizontal crevices.

Sandy beaches and bottoms (including shelly, pebble and gravel bottoms) Sandy bottoms at first glance appear to be fairly barren areas, as they lack the stability to support many of the spectacular reef based species, and the variety of large organisms is relatively low. The sand is continually being moved around by wave action, to a greater or lesser degree depending on weather conditions and exposure of the area. This means that sessile organisms must be specifically adapted to areas of relatively loose substrate to thrive in them, and the variety of species found on a sandy or gravel bottom will depend on all these factors. Sandy bottoms have one important compensation for their instability, animals can burrow into the sand and move up and down within its layers, which can provide feeding opportunities and protection from predation. Other species can dig themselves holes in which to shelter, or may feed by filtering water drawn through the tunnel, or by extending body parts adapted to this function into the water above the sand.

The open sea The pelagic water column is the major part of the living space at sea. This is the water between the surface and the top of the benthic zone, where living organisms swim, float or drift, and the food chain starts with phytoplankton, the mostly microscopic photosynthetic organisms that convert the energy of sunlight into organic material which feeds nearly everything else, directly or indirectly. In temperate seas there are distinct seasonal cycles of phytoplankton growth, based on the available nutrients and the available sunlight. Either can be a limiting factor. Phytoplankton tend to thrive where there is plenty of light, and they themselves are a major factor in restricting light penetration to greater depths, so the photosynthetic zone tends to be shallower in areas of high productivity. Zooplankton feed on the phytoplankton, and are in turn eaten by larger animals. The larger pelagic animals are generally faster moving and more mobile, giving them the option of changing depth to feed or to avoid predation, and to move to other places in search of a better food supply.

=== Marine species diversity ===
==== Animals ====
Fish:

Individual bag limit species:

- Argyrosomus japonicus (dusky kob)
- Diplodus capensis (blacktail)
- Pachymetopon grande (bronze bream)
- Pomatomus saltatrix (elf, shad)
- Mugilidae spp. (mullet)
- Neoscorpis lithophilus (stone bream)
- Sarpa salpa (strepie)
- Pomadasys commersoni (spotted grunter)
- Coracinus multifasciatus (banded galjoen)
- Pomadasys olivaceum (piggy)
- Dichistius capensis (galjoen)
- Acanthropagrus berda (river bream)
- Lichia amia (garrick, leervis)
- Sparodon durbanensis (white musselcracker)
- Dasyatis chrysonota (blue stingray)
- Elops machnata (ladyfish, kingspringer)
- Polystaganus praeorbitalis (Scotsman)
- Diplodus cervinus (zebra)
- Rhabdosargus sarba (natal stumpnose)

Cumulative bag limit species:

- Rhinobatos annulatus (lesser sandshark)
- Plotosus nkunga (eeltail barbel)
- Galeichthys feliceps (white barbel)
- Chirodactylus brachydactylus (butterfish)
- Plectorhinchus flavomaculatus (lemonfish)
- Dinoperca petersi (cavebass)
- Platycephalus indicus (bartailed flathead)

Invertebrates:

- Panulirus homarus (east coast rock lobster)

==== Endemism ====
The MPA is in the warm temperate Agulhas ecoregion to the east of Cape Point which extends eastwards to the Mbashe River. There are a large proportion of species endemic to South Africa along this coastline.

== See also ==
Marine protected areas of South Africa

- List of protected areas of South Africa
- Marine protected areas of South Africa – Protected areas of coastline or ocean in the EEZ of South Africa
