= Settlers Dam =

- Location within South Africa
- Country: South Africa
- Location: Grahamstown
- Coordinates: 33°24′42″S 26°30′34″E
- Purpose: Household and recreation
- Status: Operational

Dam and spillways
- Impounds: Kariega and Palmiet Rivers

Settlers Dam is situated outside Grahamstown, South Africa, east of the Kariega and Palmiet River's confluence. Its purpose is recreation and water supply for Grahamstown.

The dam is flanked on its northern shore by the Thomas Baines Nature Reserve.
