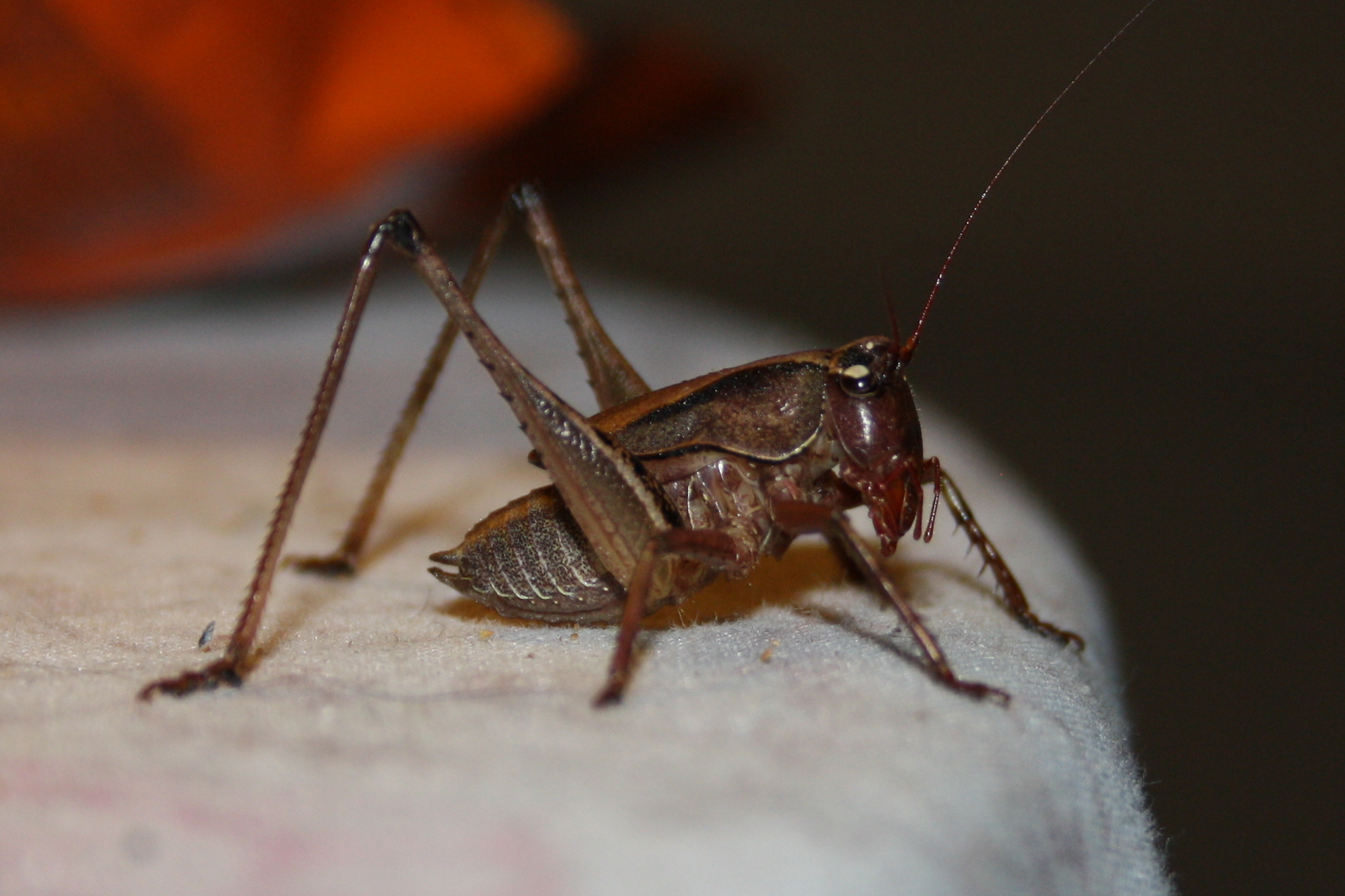
- Alfredectes semiaeneus in George, Western Cape

Scientific classification
- Domain: Eukaryota
- Kingdom: Animalia
- Phylum: Arthropoda
- Class: Insecta
- Order: Orthoptera
- Suborder: Ensifera
- Family: Tettigoniidae
- Subfamily: Tettigoniinae
- Tribe: Arytropteridini
- Genus: Alfredectes; D.C.F. Rentz, 1988

Species
- See text

= Alfredectes =

Genus of cricket-like animals

Alfredectes is a genus of bush crickets or katydids, which is endemic to South Africa.

== Species ==
The genus contains the following species:

- Alfredectes browni Rentz, 1988 – Brown's shieldback
- Alfredectes semiaeneus (Serville, 1838) – Alfred's shieldback
