= King William's Town Nature Reserve =

Nature reserve in South Africa

- Type: Nature Reserve
- Location: Qonce
- Coordinates: 32°51′46″S 27°24′42″E
- Area: 108.64 ha
- Established: 21 December 1973
- Administered by: Eastern Cape Parks
- King William's Town Nature Reserve (South Africa) King William's Town Nature Reserve (Eastern Cape)

The King William's Town Nature Reserve is a protected area in Qonce (formerly King William's Town) in the Eastern Cape, South Africa. It is located on the R63 road and is administered by Eastern Cape Parks.

== History ==
This 108.64 ha reserve was created in 1973 for the conservation of the region's fauna and flora.

== See also ==
- List of protected areas of South Africa
