= Albany thickets =

Afrotropic terrestrial ecoregion of dense woodland in South Africa

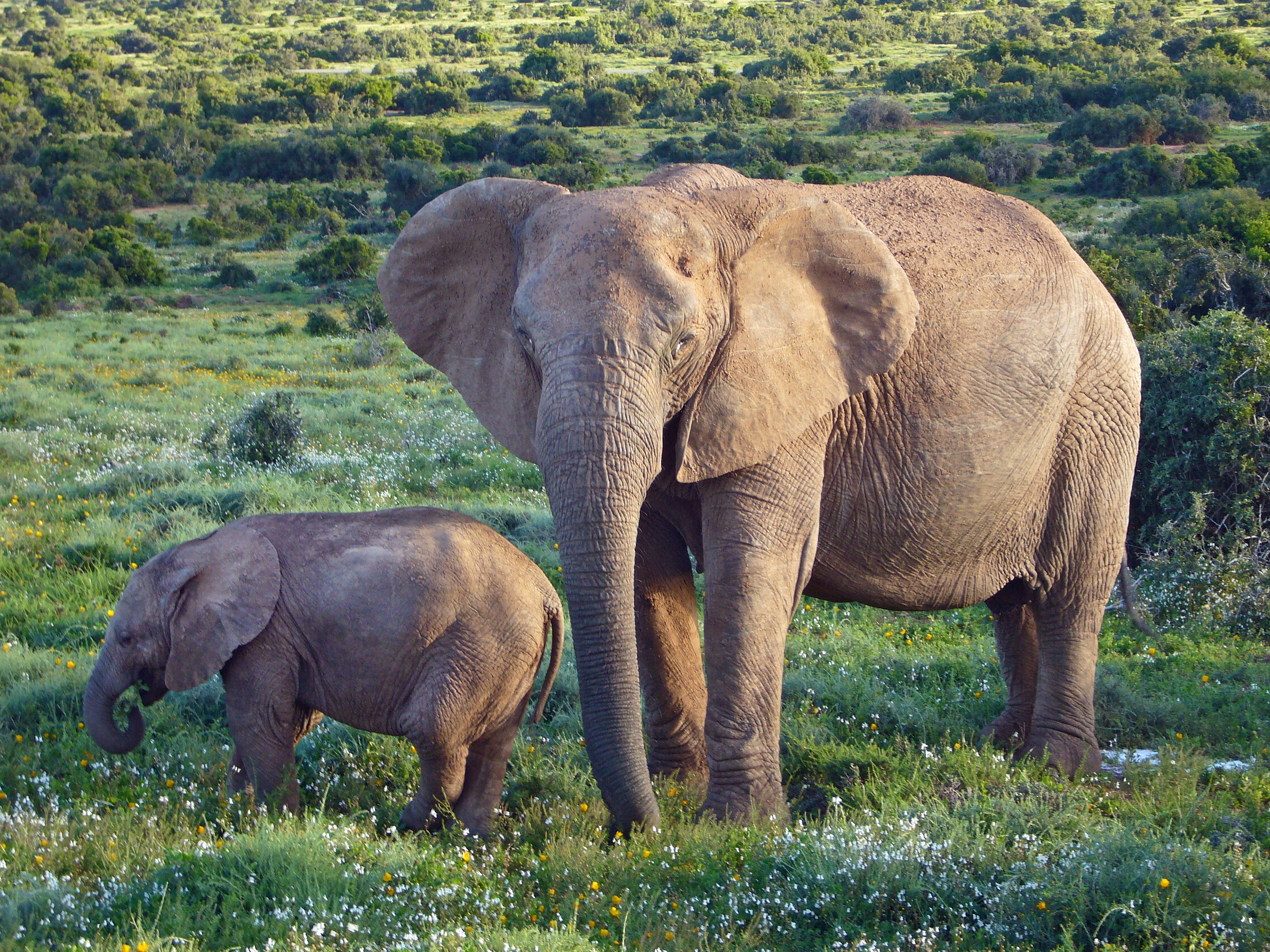
- African bush elephants in Addo Elephant National Park

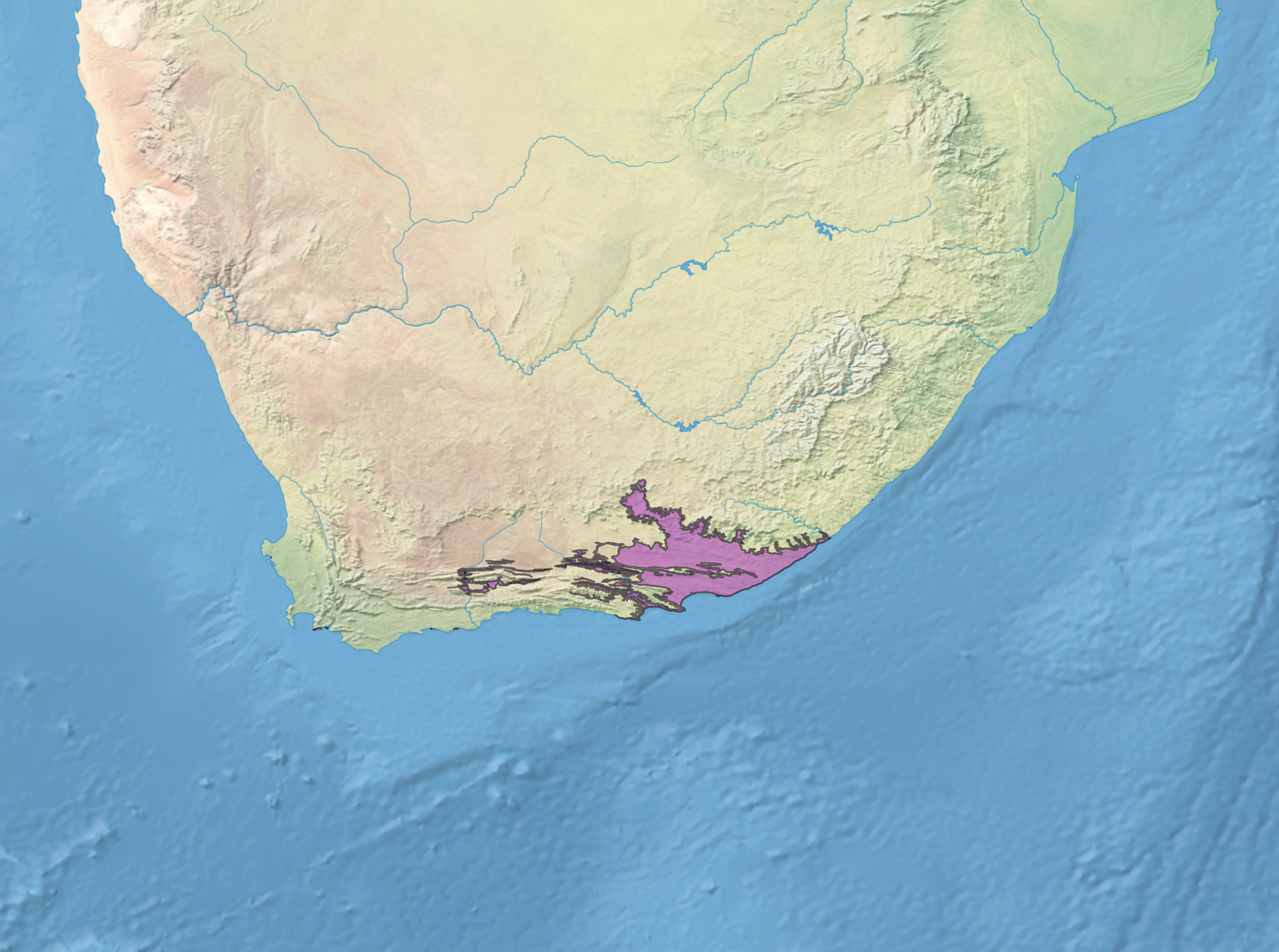
- Map of the Albany thickets

Ecology
- Realm: Afrotropical
- Biome: Mediterranean forests, woodlands, and scrub
- Borders: List: Drakensberg montane grasslands, woodlands, and forests; Kwazulu-Cape coastal forest mosaic; Lowland fynbos and renosterveld; Maputaland-Pondoland bushland and thickets; Montane fynbos and renosterveld; Nama Karoo

Geography
- Area: 17,100 km^{2} (6,600 sq mi)
- Countries: South Africa

Conservation
- Conservation status: Critical/endangered

The Albany thickets is an ecoregion of dense woodland in southern South Africa, which is concentrated around the Albany region of the Eastern Cape (whence the region's name originates).

== Geography ==
The thickets grow on well-drained sandy soils in the wide valleys of the Great Fish, Sundays and Gamtoos River in the Eastern Cape and, extending further northwest, in the valleys of the Cape Fold Belt. Thicket is vulnerable to fire and to grazing so has always been restricted to valley areas where these are less of a threat than on open plains.

== Climate ==
The climate is dry, especially as one proceeds inland, but the shady valleys are cooler than the surrounding terrain which is hot in summer, cold in winter and receives irregular rainfall.

== Flora ==
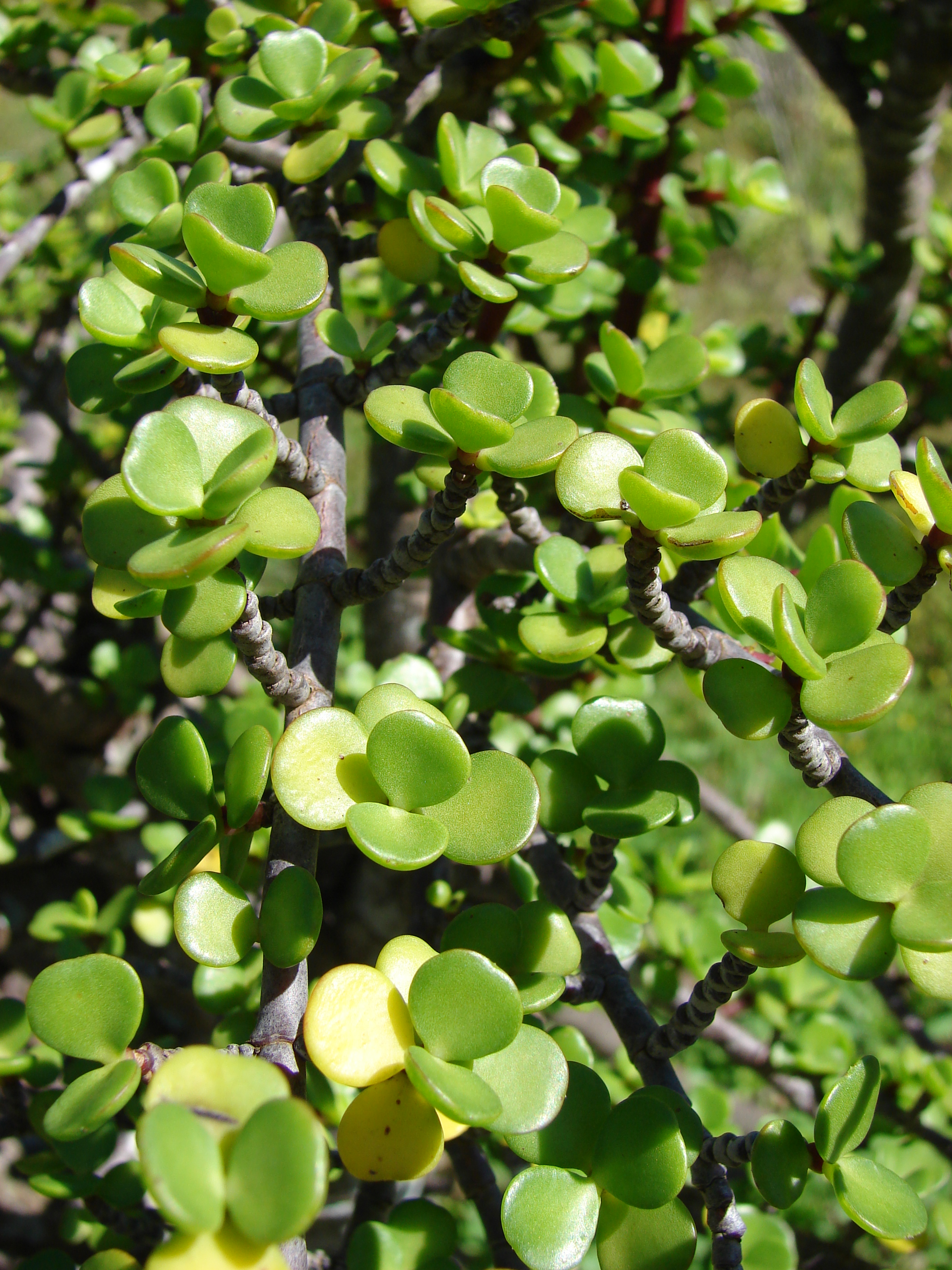
The porkbush succulent is a dominant species

The thickets contain many endemic plants, in particular succulent Euphorbia species and can be divided into three sections of varying habitat. The thicket is richest and most dense in the river valleys near the coast where it contains thorny shrubs with an undergrowth of creepers and succulent plants. As the river valleys climb inland and upstream the climate is drier and the vegetation less dense. Finally the shrubland in mountain valleys to the northwest consists of predominantly the porkbush (Portulacaria afra) and jade plant (Crassula ovata) succulents, along with boxthorn (Lycium austrinum), jacketplum (Pappea capensis), Euclea undulata, Rhigozum obovatum, aloes and Schotia afra. Along with the fynbos ecoregions the Albany thickets comprise the Cape Floristic Region.

== Fauna ==
Birds in this area include black goshawk, black-headed oriole and two species which are almost endemic to the Cape area, the orange-breasted sunbird and Cape siskin. There is one near-endemic mammal Duthie's golden mole (Chlorotalpat duthieae) and in the inland valleys, Addo Elephant National Park is home to African bush elephant (Loxodonta africana), black rhinoceros (Diceros bicornis) and antelopes such as bushbuck (Tragelaphus scriptus), grey rhebok (Pelea capreolus), mountain reedbuck (Redunca fulvorufula), common eland (Taurotragus oryx), greater kudu (Tragelaphus strepsiceros), red hartebeest (Alcelaphus buselaphus), Cape grysbok (Raphicerus melanotis) and common duiker (Sylvicapra grimmia).

== Threats and preservation ==
A large part of the region has been converted for agriculture or reduced by grazing, especially by goats. This is a continuous threat especially in the river valleys near the coast, which are also vulnerable to clearance for urban areas and tourist resorts. Protected areas include Addo Elephant National Park near Port Elizabeth, the Groendal Wilderness Area near Uitenhage on the Swartkops River, and the Baviaanskloof Mega Reserve.

== See also ==
- Cape Floristic Region – Smallest of the six recognised floral kingdoms of the world
