= Hluleka Nature Reserve =

Nature reserve in Eastern Cape Province, South Africa

- Location within Eastern Cape
- Location: Eastern Cape Province, South Africa
- Coordinates: 31.82°S 29.30°E
- Area: 770 ha (1,900 acres)
- Governing body: Eastern Cape Parks
- Website: www.visiteasterncape.co.za/nature-conservation/provincial-parks/hluleka/

The Hluleka Nature Reserve is a nature reserve in Eastern Cape Province, South Africa that is managed by Eastern Cape Parks, it is about 90 km to the south-east of Mthatha, and 30 kilometres south of Port St Johns. The size of the reserve is 772 ha

The presence of wild animals in the reserve is more than obvious – bushbuck, bush pig, eland, Burchell's zebra, rock dassies, blue wildebeest, impala and the blue duiker are some of the residents.

== See also ==
- South African National Parks – Body responsible for managing South Africa's national parks
- List of protected areas of South Africa
