= Dwesa Nature Reserve =

Nature reserve in the Eastern Cape Province, South Africa

- Interactive map of Dwesa Nature Reserve
- Location: Eastern Cape Province, South Africa
- Coordinates: 32.260°S 28.895°E
- Area: 5,450 ha (13,500 acres) terrestrial 19,293 ha (47,670 acres) marine
- Established: 21 October 1927 – Cwebe Forest Reserve; 22 June 1928 – Dwesa Forest Reserve; 25 July 1975 – Dwesa-Cwebe Nature Reserve
- Administrator: Eastern Cape Parks
- Website: http://www.ecparks.co.za/parks-reserves/dwesa/index.html

The Dwesa-Cwebe Marine Protected Area off the coast of the Dwesa-Cwebe Nature Reserve

Dwesa-Cwebe Nature Reserve is a nature reserve in the Eastern Cape Province, South Africa that is managed by Eastern Cape Parks & Tourism Agency. The park has an area of 5,450 hectares (13,500 acres). The Dwesa-Cwebe Marine Protected Area, that has been added to the park has an area of 19,293 hectares (47,670 acres).

On one side, the reserve is surrounded by the Indian Ocean, and on the other by the rugged pastures of the former Transkei.

About 290 species of birds have been recorded in the park.

From the top of Kobole Point, there are magnificent views across the ocean.

== History ==
The Dwesa-Cwebe Nature Reserve was originally land owned by local farmers. Currently, debates in South African politics over land ownership and environmental sustainability are shaping who gets to control the land. The nature reserve was initially conceived to protect one of the last known coastal forests in South Africa, and also because farming practices were believed to be destroying the local ecosystem.

== See also ==
- South African National Parks
- Protected areas of South Africa
