= Kwandwe Private Game Reserve =

Private game reserve, northeast of Grahamstown, Eastern Cape, South Africa

Kwandwe Private Game Reserve is a private game reserve, northeast of Grahamstown, Eastern Cape, South Africa. The reserve covers an area of 30,000 ha (74,000 acres), almost divided in half by the Great Fish River. The name Kwandwe means Place of the Blue Crane in the local language. Mammals such as the Big five game, Black wildebeest, Cape grysbok and Black-footed cat are found on the reserve as well as bird species including Blue crane, Knysna woodpecker and Crowned eagle.

== Climate ==
The January maximum temperature varies between 28°C and 32°C, while the July maximum temperature goes between 21°C and 25°C. The July minimum temperature is 2°C to 5°C. Rainfall fluctuates between 236 mm and 560 mm per year.
