= Buffelspruit Nature Reserve =

Small nature reserve in the far north of the Eastern Cape, South Africa

- Location within South Africa
- Location: Eastern Cape, South Africa
- Nearest city: Aliwal North
- Coordinates: 30°42′18″S 26°44′49″E
- Area: 6.22 km^{2} (2.40 sq mi)
- Governing body: Walter Sisulu Local Municipality

Buffelspruit Nature Reserve is a smallish nature reserve in the far north of the Eastern Cape, South Africa.

Covering an area of 622 hectares (1,540 acres), the Buffelspruit Nature Reserve is situated along the Kraai River bordering the town of Aliwal North. It is owned and managed by the Walter Sisulu Local Municipality and is open throughout the year. Mammals frequently spotted are blesbuck, black wildebeest, zebra, gemsbok (Oryx gazella) and springbok, as well as some ostriches. Right next to the reserve's border fence is a target shooting range, mainly used by the South African Police Service for officer training, where they must take care to aim at paper targets and not, of course, at the free-range antelope found nearby.

== Foot note ==
As of this edit, this article uses content from "{{{sourcearticle}}}", which is licensed in a way that permits reuse under the Creative Commons Attribution-ShareAlike 3.0 Unported License, but not under the GFDL. All relevant terms must be followed.
