= Mbumbazi Nature Reserve =

- IUCN category IV (habitat/species management area)
- Interactive map of Mbumbazi Nature Reserve
- Location: Ugu District, KwaZulu-Natal, South Africa
- Nearest city: Margate / Port Shepstone
- Coordinates: 30°48′30″S 30°16′45″E
- Area: 2,081 ha (5,140 acres)
- Established: 1986
- Governing body: Ezemvelo KZN Wildlife

Mbumbazi Nature Reserve is a 2,081-hectare (5,140-acre) nature reserve situated in the southern region of KwaZulu-Natal, South Africa, approximately 32 km (20 mi) inland from Port Shepstone. Managed by Ezemvelo KZN Wildlife, the reserve is significant for its preservation of the critically endangered South Coast Grassland and its rugged riverine gorge systems.

== Geography ==
The reserve is located within the jurisdiction of the Ray Nkonyeni Local Municipality (formerly Hibiscus Coast). The terrain is characterized by a high plateau and deep, steep-sided sandstone gorges formed by the Mbumbazi River and its tributaries. Altitudes within the reserve range from 110 m to 550 m above sea level.

One of the reserve's most prominent features is the "Rossler's Gorge", a deep valley named after the family that previously owned a portion of the land.

== History ==
The reserve was formally proclaimed in 1986 under the Nature Conservation Ordinance (Act No. 15 of 1974). Prior to its proclamation, the area was a mix of private commercial farms and state-owned land held by the Department of Development Aid for homeland consolidation purposes. The name "Mbumbazi" refers to the "catapult-like" V-shape of the entrance to a typical traditional Zulu homestead, reflecting the topography of the local valleys.

== Biodiversity ==
Mbumbazi is an important biodiversity "hotspot" for the South Coast, serving as a corridor between the coastal plains and the interior highlands.

=== Flora ===
The reserve protects two primary vegetation types:

- South Coast Grassland: This is a critically endangered habitat. Within Mbumbazi, approximately 1,078 hectares of this primary grassland remain, though they face threats from alien plant encroachment and lack of fire management.
- Scarp Forest: The deep gorges are filled with indigenous scarp forest, featuring high-canopy trees such as Yellowwoods (Podocarpus) and Cape Chestnuts.

=== Fauna ===
- Mammals: Common residents include Blue duiker, Red duiker, Bushbuck, Samango monkey, and Caracal.
- Avifauna: The reserve is noted for its birdlife, particularly forest and grassland specialists. Species found here include the Knysna turaco, Narina trogon, and various kingfishers along the river courses.
- Reptiles: The riverine habitats provide sanctuary for various snakes and lizards, including the Southern African python.

== Tourism and Facilities ==
Mbumbazi is primarily managed as a conservation-focused wilderness area, and tourism infrastructure is limited compared to coastal resorts.

- Activities: Visitors can engage in birdwatching and self-guided hiking, though the terrain in the gorges is considered strenuous.
- Access: The reserve is reached via the N2 highway from Port Shepstone, turning off at Main Road 55 and District Road 178.
