= Baviaanskloof Mega Reserve =

Protected area in Eastern Cape, South Africa

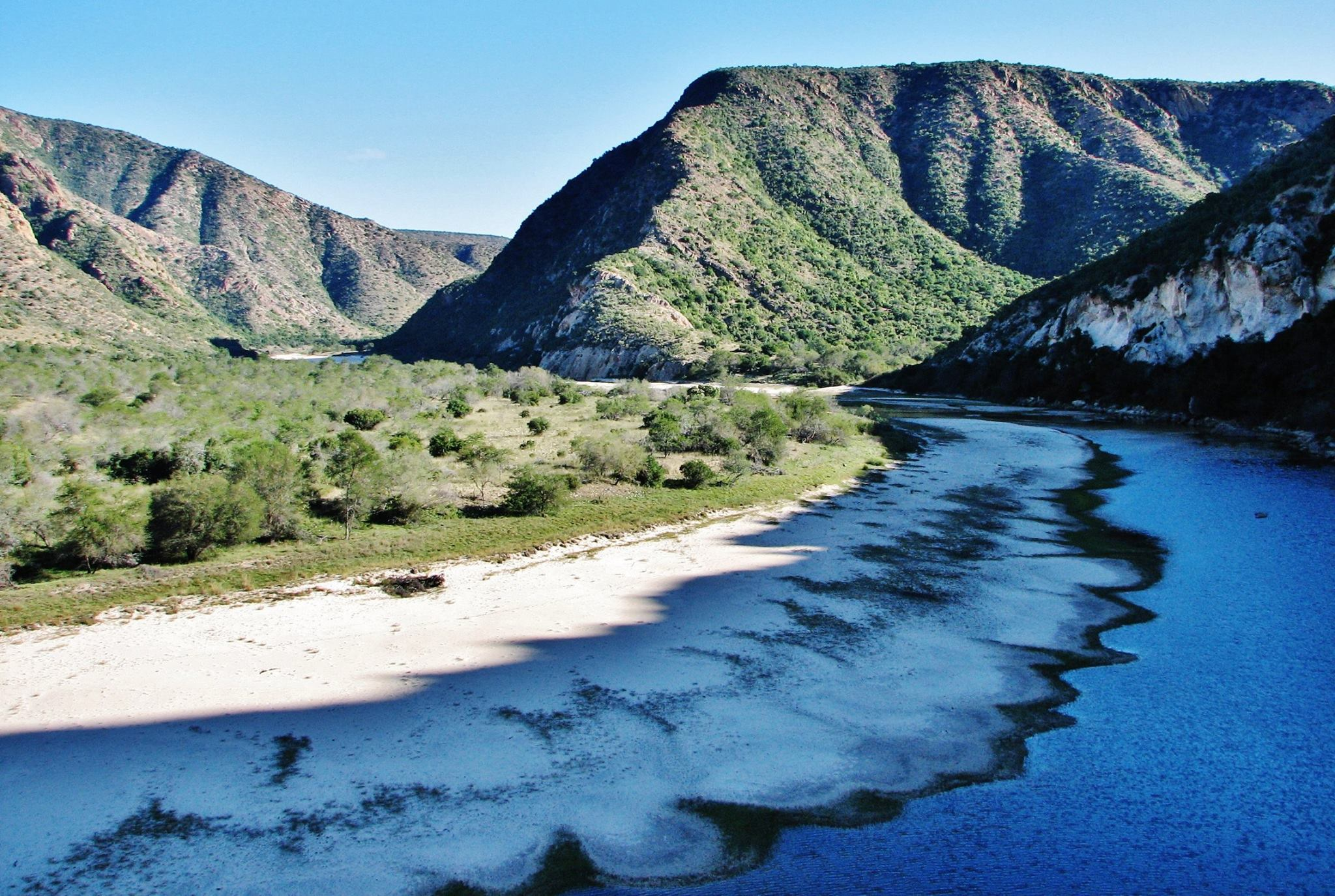
- Kouga River

- Location within Eastern Cape
- Location: Baviaanskloof Valley
- Nearest city: Willowmore
- Coordinates: 33°30′S 24°8′E
- Area: 500,000 ha (1,200,000 acres)
- Governing body: Eastern Cape Parks

Baviaanskloof Mega Reserve is a protected area in the Eastern Cape Province, South Africa.

== Characteristics ==
The Baviaanskloof (Dutch for "Valley of Baboons") lies between the Baviaanskloof and Kouga mountain ranges. The easternmost point of the valley is some 95 km (59 mi) NW of the coastal city of Port Elizabeth.

The Baviaanskloof area includes a cluster of formal protected areas managed by the Eastern Cape Parks Board totalling around 5,000 square kilometres (1,900 sq mi), of which the most well-known is the 184,385 ha (711.91 mi^{2}) Baviaanskloof Nature Reserve – the third largest protected area in South Africa. The Baviaanskloof Forest Reserve was established in 1920. It also includes the Groendal Nature Reserve and Formosa Nature Reserve, and encompasses private land.

The Baviaanskloof area is one of outstanding natural beauty, owing to its spectacular land forms, a diverse array of plants and wide variety of animals. The area is part of the Cape Floristic Region World Heritage Site as of 2004.

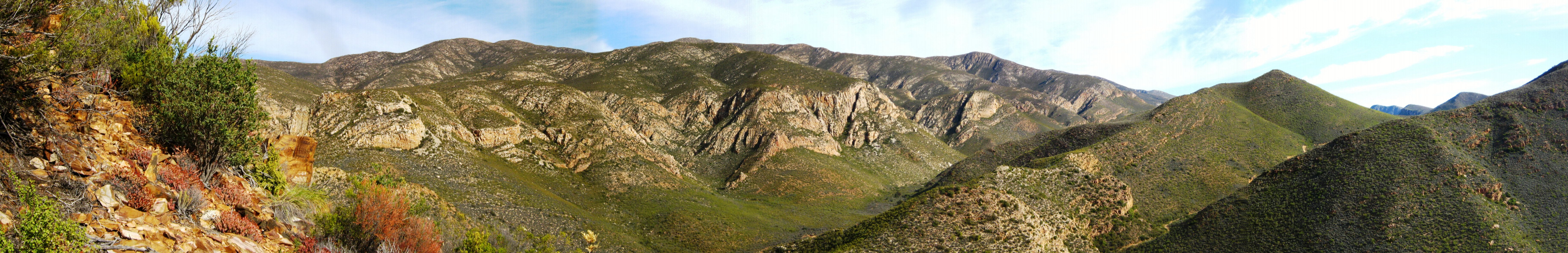
Panorama of the Baviaanskloof range
