= Great Fish River Nature Reserve =

Nature reserve in Eastern Cape Province, South Africa

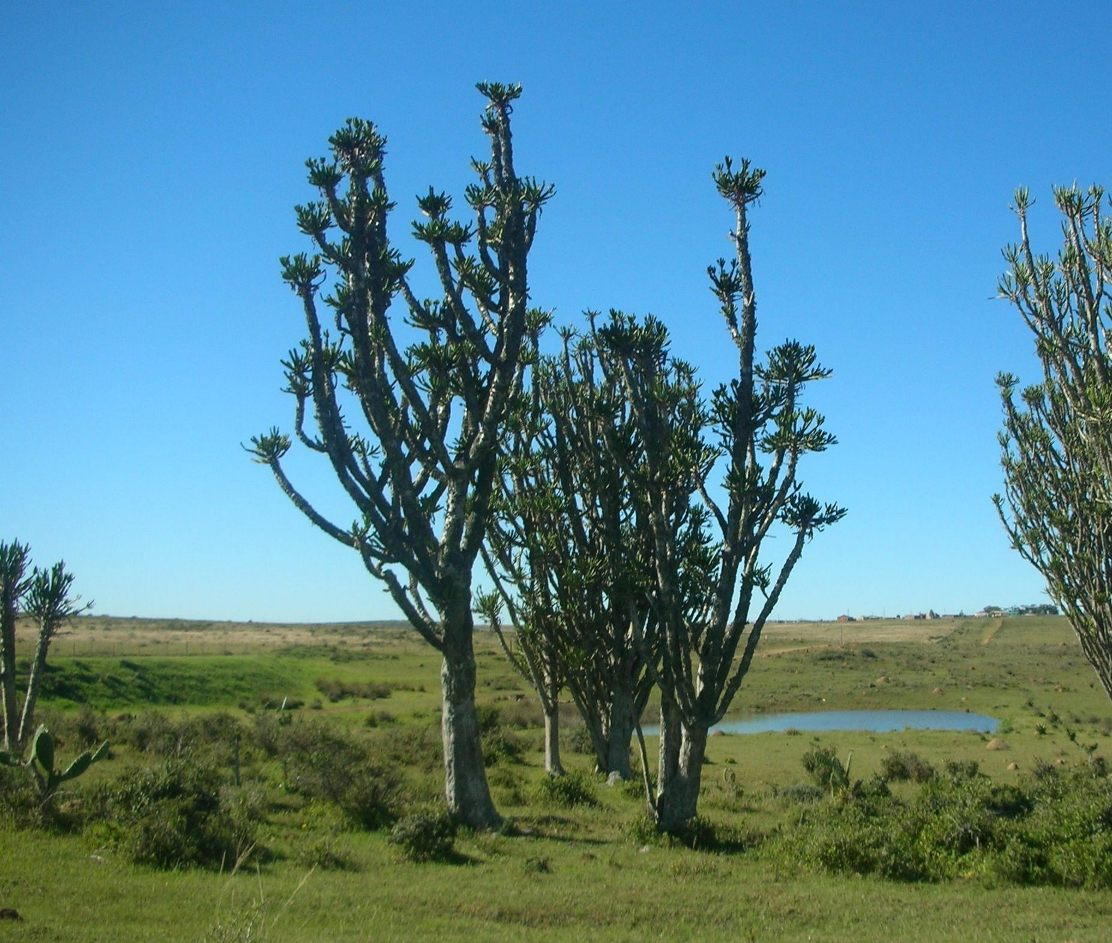
- Landscape close to Great Fish River
- Location in Eastern Cape, South Africa
- Location: Eastern Cape, South Africa
- Nearest city: Grahamstown
- Coordinates: 32°57′46″S 26°50′32″E
- Area: 45,000 ha (110,000 acres)
- Established: 1994; 32 years ago
- Governing body: Eastern Cape Parks
- Great Fish River Nature Reserve (Eastern Cape)

Great Fish River Nature Reserve is a nature reserve in Eastern Cape Province, South Africa that is managed by Eastern Cape Parks. The park has a total area of 45,000 ha, and has been operational since 1994. It comprises three historical nature reserves that have been combined into a single reserve:

- Andries Vosloo Kudu Reserve
- Double Drift Nature Reserve
- Sam Knott Nature Reserve

The reserves are linked by a circular route, and the Great Fish River runs through the park.

The elevation of the reserve varies from 95 meters to 561 meters above sea level, characterized predominantly by sharp cliffs descending into river valleys and fragmented ridges between basins. The majority of the reserve is composed of the Great Fish subtropical thicket.

== See also ==
- South African National Parks – Body responsible for managing South Africa's national parks
- List of protected areas of South Africa
