= Game drive (Wildlife tourism) =

Part of safari for viewing animals

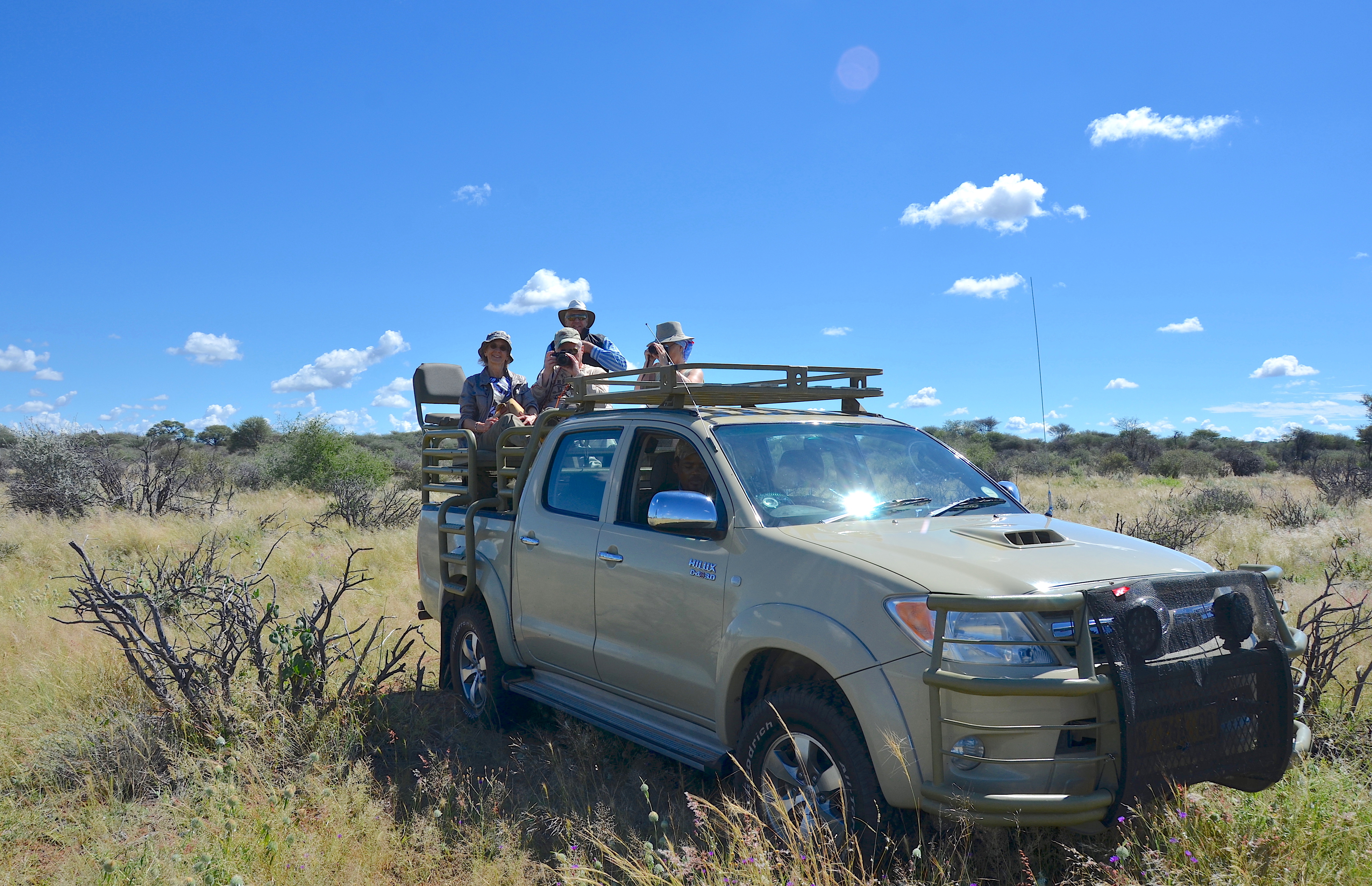
Game drive on a farm in Namibia

The word game drive, also used in German Language, is usually part of a safari, a trip or a journey. It can be carried out with own cars like in national parks or game reserves, or it can be a guided tour in specially for that purpose adapted off-road vehicles led by a professional safari guide. Those 4 × 4 game viewing vehicles are designed to allow a safer trip for tourists. On farms and lodges however, a game drive is an adventure that entails viewing wildlife in an off-road car, always accompanied by safari guides or the farmer himself, who will explain the animal's behavior and interpret the bush.

Guided game drives are particularly popular in Botswana, South Africa and Namibia, and mostly take place in the early morning, late afternoon or in the evening, because most animals are more active during cooler times of the day.

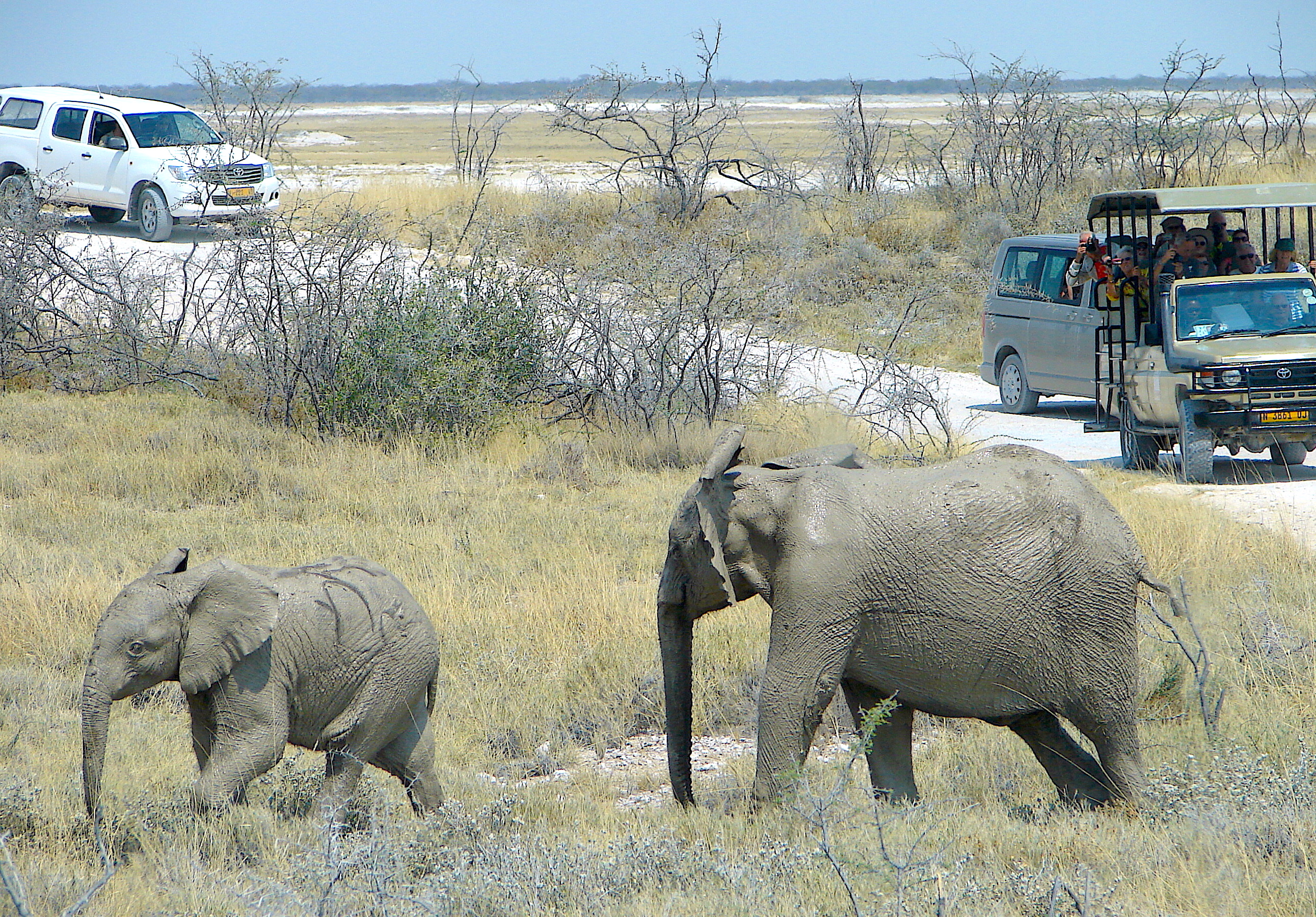
Tourists on a game drive at Etosha National Park taking photos of elephants
