= Fort Fordyce Nature Reserve =

Nature reserve in Eastern Cape Province, South Africa

Coordinates: 32.6037594°S 26.37413°E

Fort Fordyce Nature Reserve is a nature reserve in Eastern Cape Province, South Africa that is managed by Eastern Cape Parks, and has an area of 2,136 hectares (5,280 acres).

It was established as a National Reserve in 1987.

175 species of birds have been recorded in the park.

== See also ==
- South African National Parks – Body responsible for managing South Africa's national parks
- List of protected areas of South Africa – Areas protected for conservation in South Africa
