= Ntokou-Pikounda National Park =

National park in the Republic of the Congo

- IUCN category II (national park)
- Location within Republic of the Congo
- Location: Republic of the Congo
- Coordinates: 0°21′N 16°33′E
- Area: 4,572 km^{2} (1,765 sq mi)
- Established: 28 December 2012

Ntokou-Pikounda National Park is a 4,572-square-kilometre (1,130,000-acre) protected area in the Congo Basin of the Republic of the Congo. The park is known as the "Green Abyss" from J. Michael Fay's MegaTransect. The towns and villages surrounding the park have a combined population of 25,000-30,000 people, and few services exist for tourists.

== Wildlife ==
The park was created on 28 December 2012, when the Congolese Ministerial Council and President Denis Sassou Nguesso adopted the Decree Establishing the Ntokou-Pikounda National Park, primarily to protect an estimated population of 15,000 lowland gorillas. The park also has an estimated 8,000 forest elephants and 950 chimpanzees. It has also been designated an Important Bird Area (IBA) by BirdLife International because it supports significant populations of many bird species.
