= Wildlife of Gabon =

The wildlife of Gabon is composed of its flora and fauna. Gabon is a largely low-lying country with a warm, humid climate. Much of the country is still covered by tropical rainforest and there are also grasslands, savannas, large rivers and coastal lagoons.

== Overview ==
Wildlife includes forest elephants, forest buffalos, various antelope and monkey species, sitatungas, leopards, three species of crocodiles, chimpanzees and gorillas, and several marine turtle species which nest along the coast. As of 2002, there were at least 190 species of mammals.

== Fauna ==
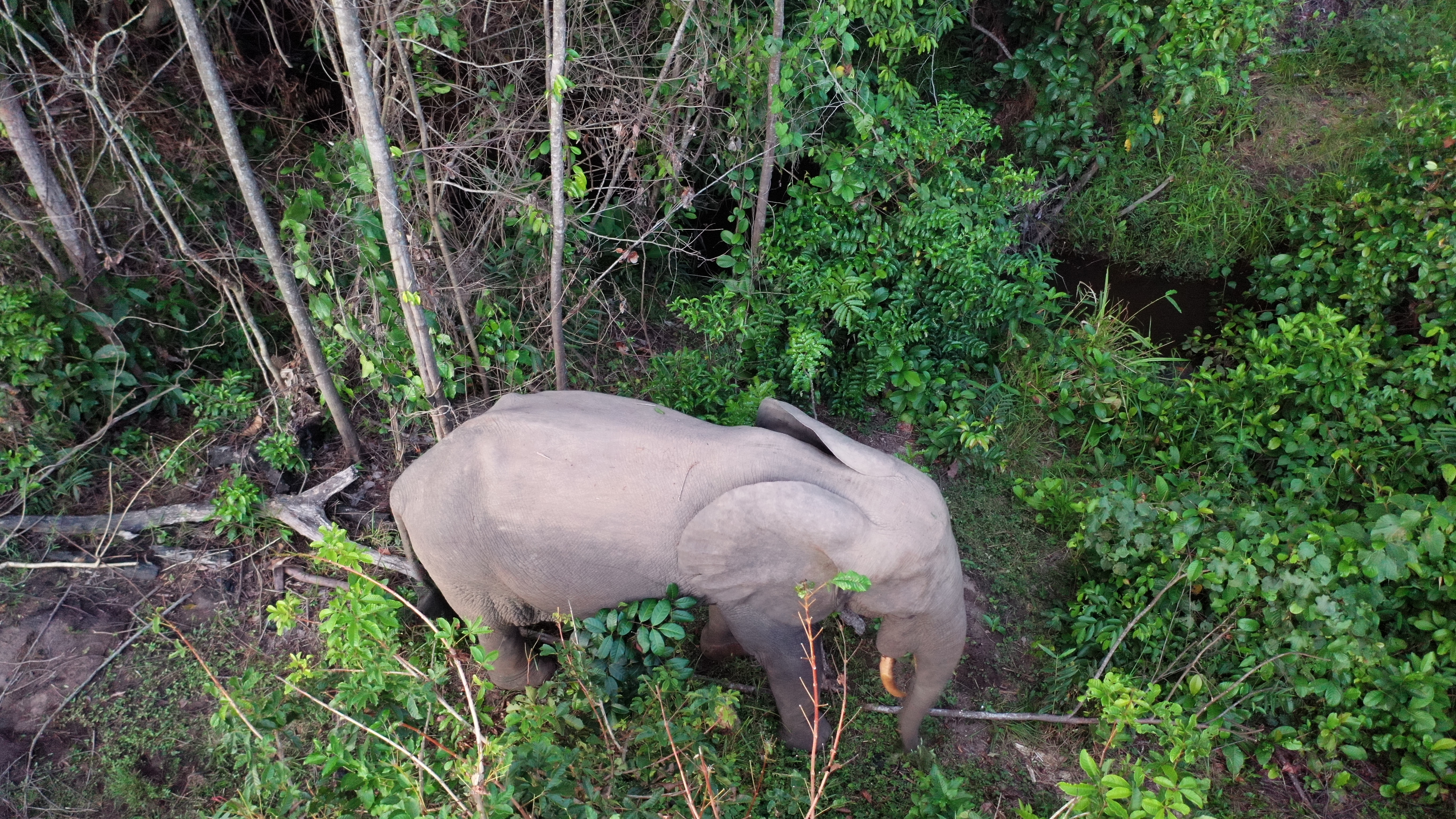
Forest elephant at the Langoué Baï, Ivindo National Park, Gabon

=== Mammals ===
Gabon has important populations of many mammals including about 35,000 gorillas, 50,000 forest elephants and 64,000 chimpanzees. About a quarter of Africa's gorillas live in Gabon. Other large mammals include the hippopotamus, forest buffalo, bongo and red river hog. A variety of monkeys occur, including the endemic sun-tailed monkey, and the near-endemic mandrill and white-collared mangabey (here near-endemic meaning most of the individuals of these species are in Gabon, but that they also occur in the neighbouring countries as well). Carnivorous mammals include the leopard, golden cat, and various jackals, mongooses, genets and civets. The last lion was killed in 1996 in the savannahs of the east of the country. The West African manatee is found along coasts and large rivers while the humpback whale breeds offshore.

=== Birds ===
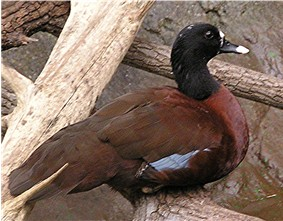
Hartlaub's duck

There are 604 species of birds throughout the country. None of these are endemic but some such as the Dja River warbler, Verreaux's batis, African river martin and black-chinned weaver are restricted to Central Africa and have only small ranges. The grey-necked picathartes and Loango weaver are classed as vulnerable species by the IUCN.

=== Reptiles ===
A variety of snakes are found including the Gaboon viper. Sea turtles breed along the coast, particularly the leatherback turtle.

Mangroves such as Rhizophora mangle line parts of the coast.

== Flora ==
There are over 7000 species of native vascular plants in Gabon. About 22% of these are endemic. New species are still being discovered such as the tree Cola lizae which was first described in 1987.

== Conservation ==
Wildlife in Gabon faces a number of threats including logging and poaching. However 11% of the country's area is now protected in a network of 13 national parks established in 2002.

== Sources ==
- African Bird Club (2008) Birds and Birding in Gabon. Accessed 18 June 2008.
- Warne, Sophie (2003) Gabon, São Tomé and Príncipe: The Bradt Travel Guide, Bradt. ISBN 1-84162-073-4
