= Langoué Baï =

Marsh in Gabon

Langoué Baï, located in Ivindo National Park, is the largest baï (a Babenzélé pygmy word for a forest clearing with a river or stream running through it) in Gabon, and covers 12.5 ha, with a length of 850 m and a width of 350 m. Archaeological findings show human habitation of other nearby clearings as recently as 4000 BP, and of the area around the current Ivindo train station and around the park in general from as early as 120,000 BP to the modern day. The baï itself was rediscovered in 2001 by Mike Fay during the Megatransect, who recognised its significance and importance for wildlife, calling it the "most important discovery" of the 2000 mile hike through Congo and Gabon.

The surrounding forest supports a relatively intact forest elephant population, unlike many other baïs in the region which are targeted for poaching, although 2014 analysis suggests poaching of older males is taking place within the population, perhaps outside of the protected area. Up to 90 different forest elephants can be seen visiting the baï per day during peak seasons, with more visiting at night. Other mammal species that make use of the baï include western lowland gorilla, African forest buffalo, red river hog, and a resident population of sitatunga. Numerous bird species also frequent the clearing, from the common hammerkop to Hartlaub's duck.

The vegetation of the baï consists mostly of Cyperaceae and Poaceae. Areas of Pandanus and Raffia are found in the south of the baï. A physical geography study conducted in the Hokou region of the Central African Republic associated the existence of elephant bais with emergent dolerite rock formations, and the availability of mineral salts is typically cited as the reason for high rates of elephant visitation.

Since 2001, the Wildlife Conservation Society (WCS) has studied and protected the baï with the support of what is now the Gabonese National Parks Agency (ANPN), and in 2004 constructed a purpose-built camp with researcher accommodation and offices, first running a combination research/ecotourism pilot project, and later focusing solely on research.

== Gallery ==
Wildlife of Langoué Baï
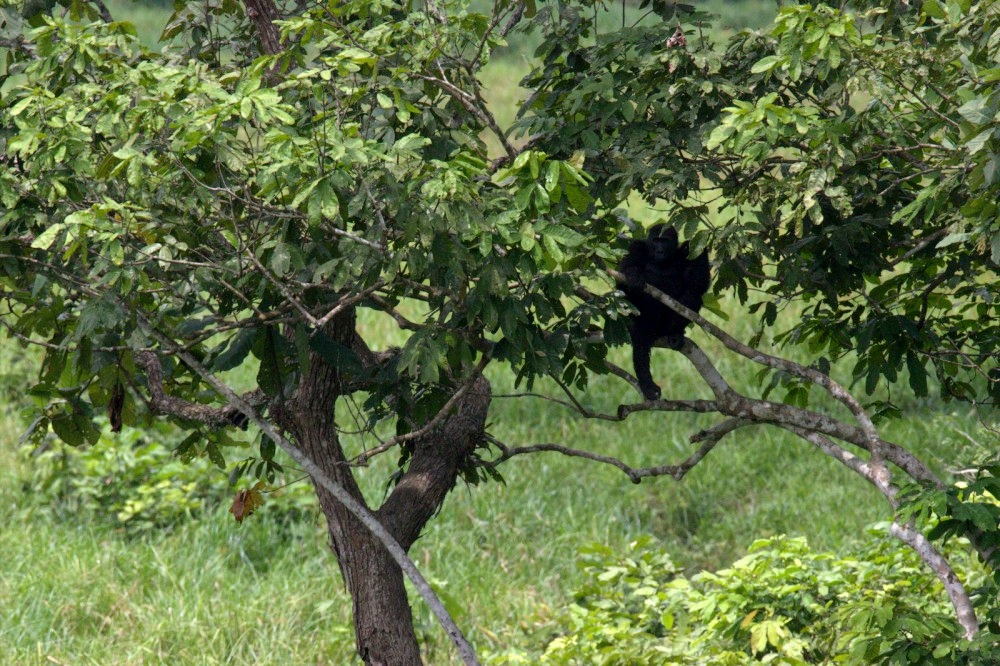
A western lowland gorilla in the trees around Langoué Baï, Ivindo National Park, Gabon.

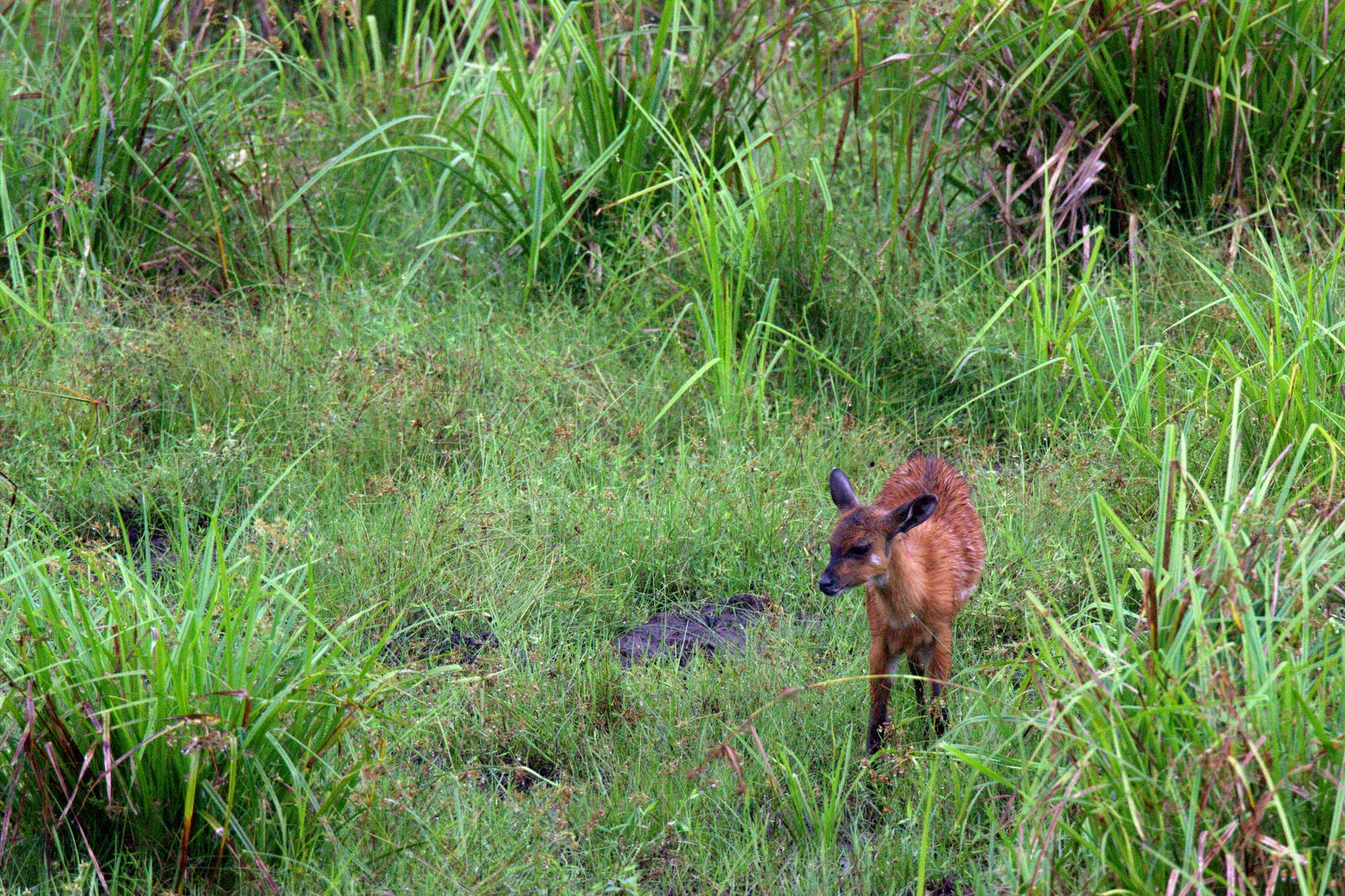
A juvenile sitatunga.

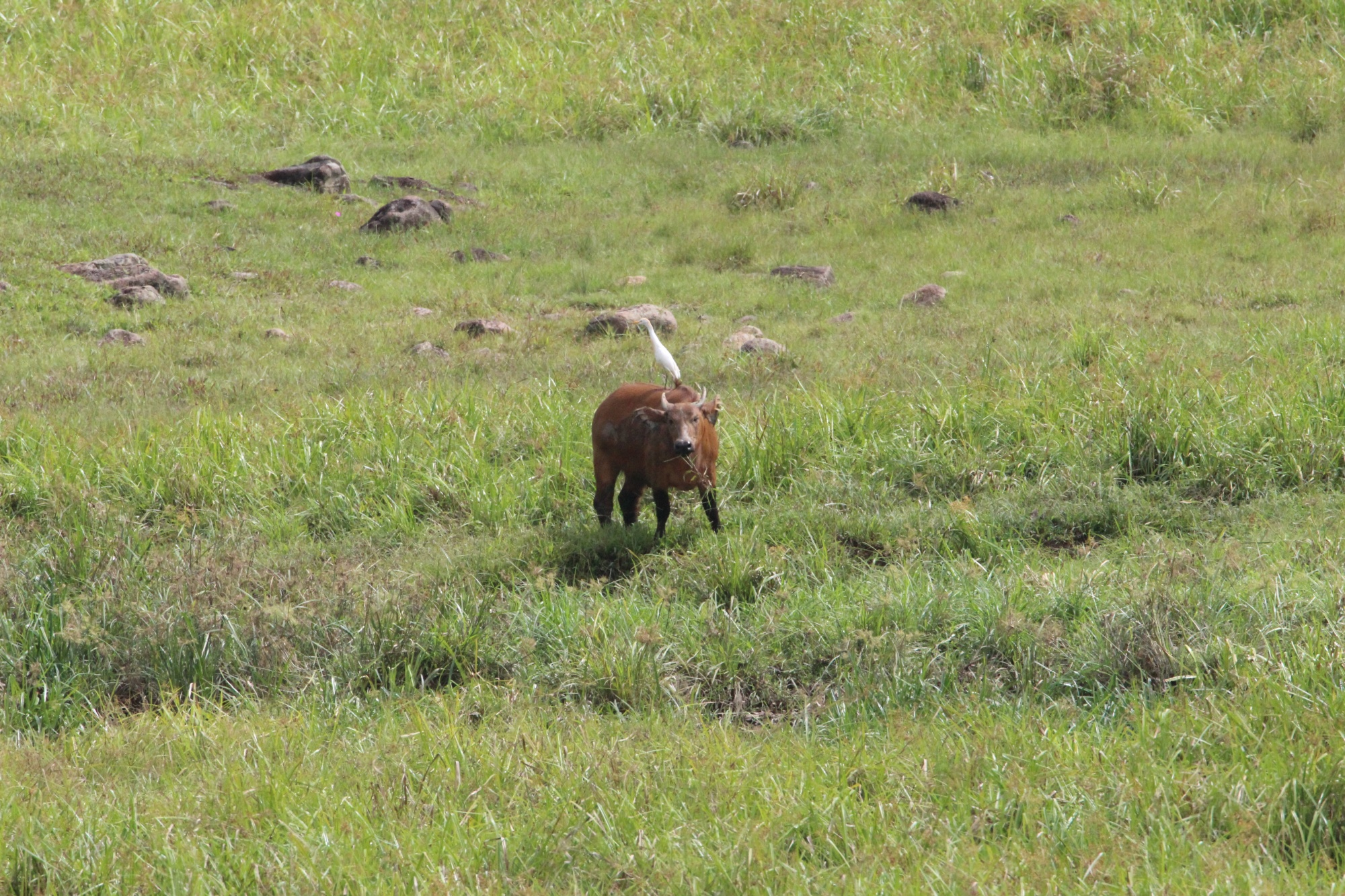
An egret sat on top of an African forest buffalo.

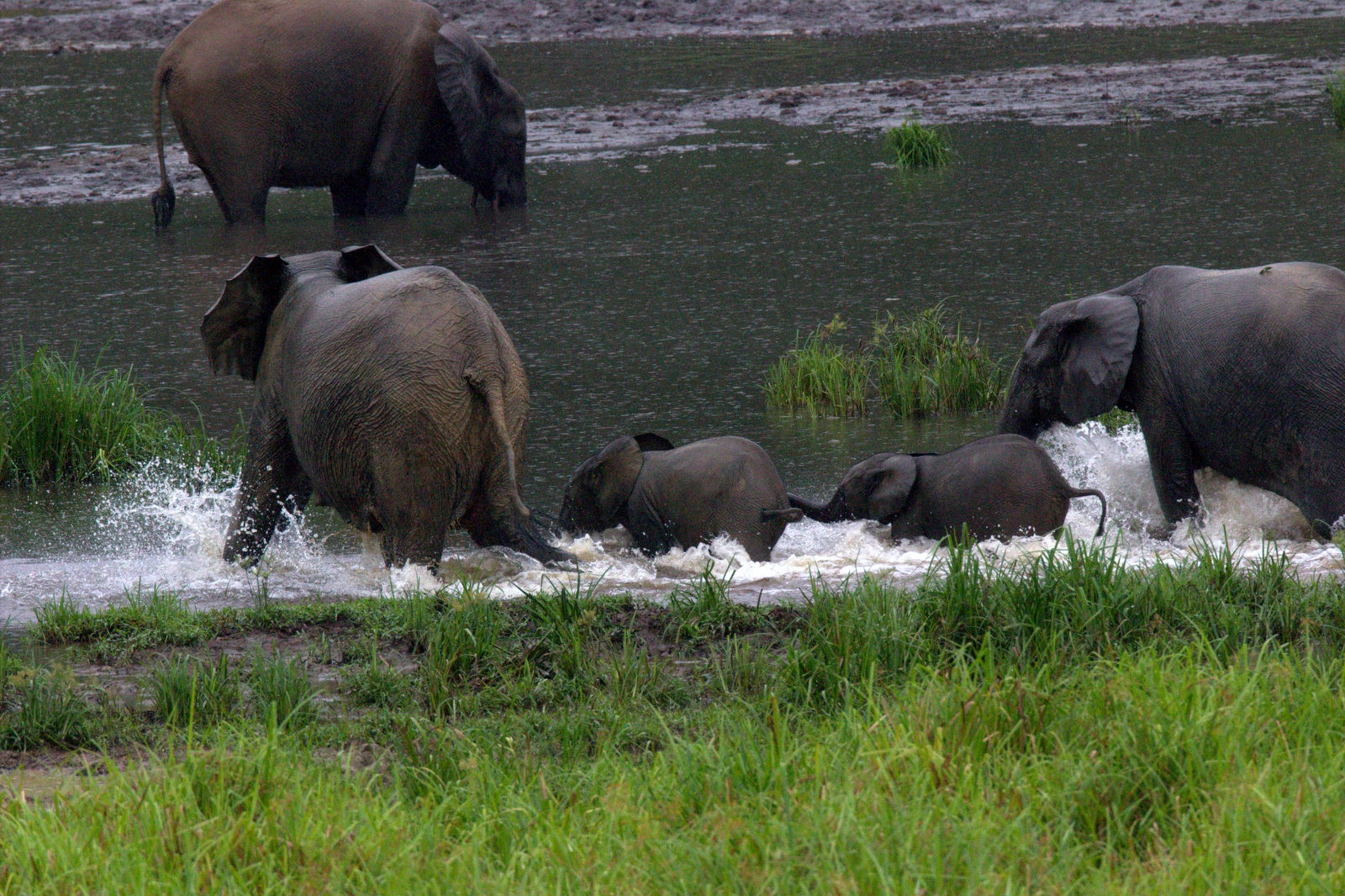
A family of elephants running in the stream that crosses the baï.

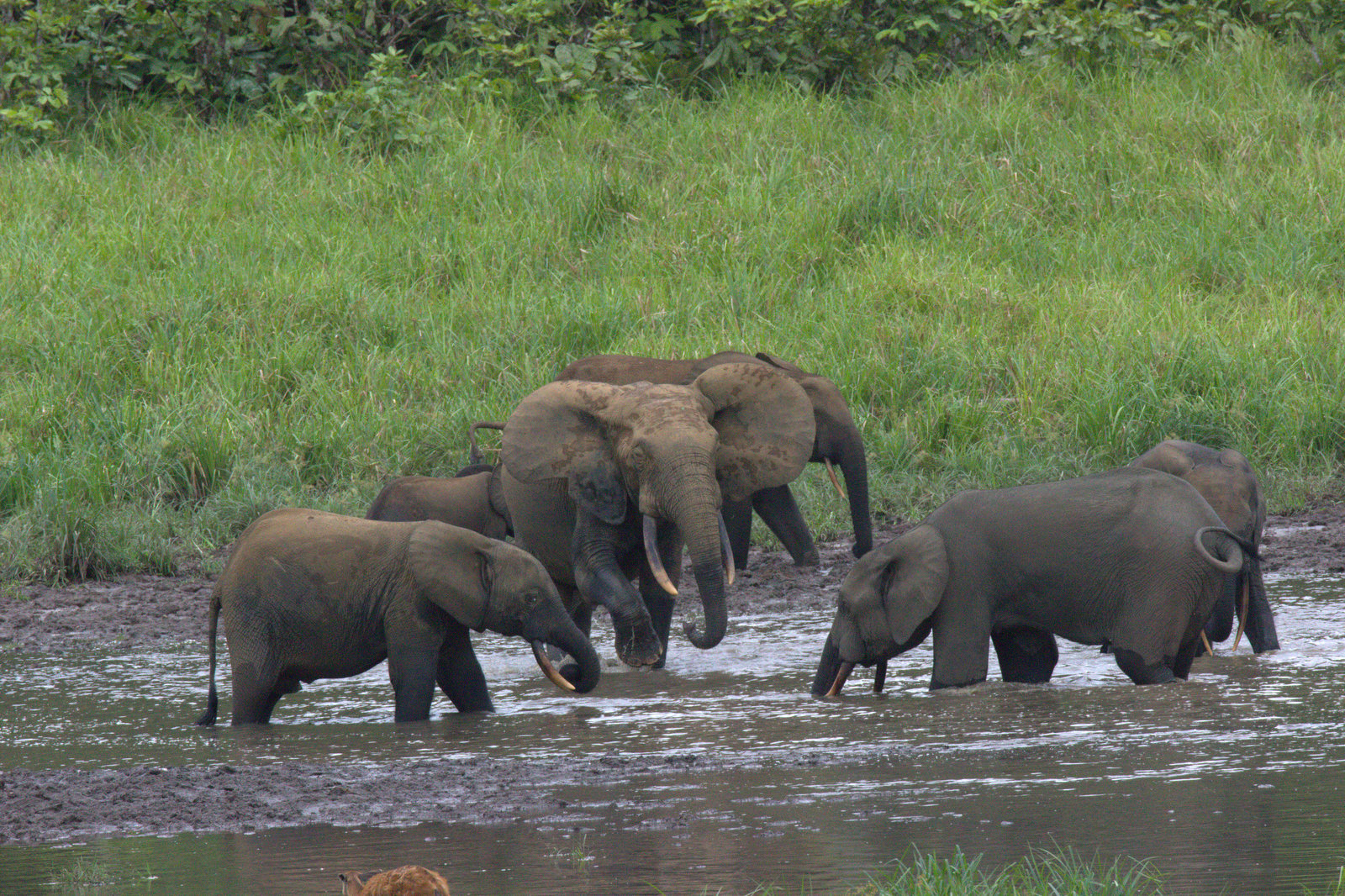
Tagoue, a 30-year-old male forest elephant, surrounded by other elephants.

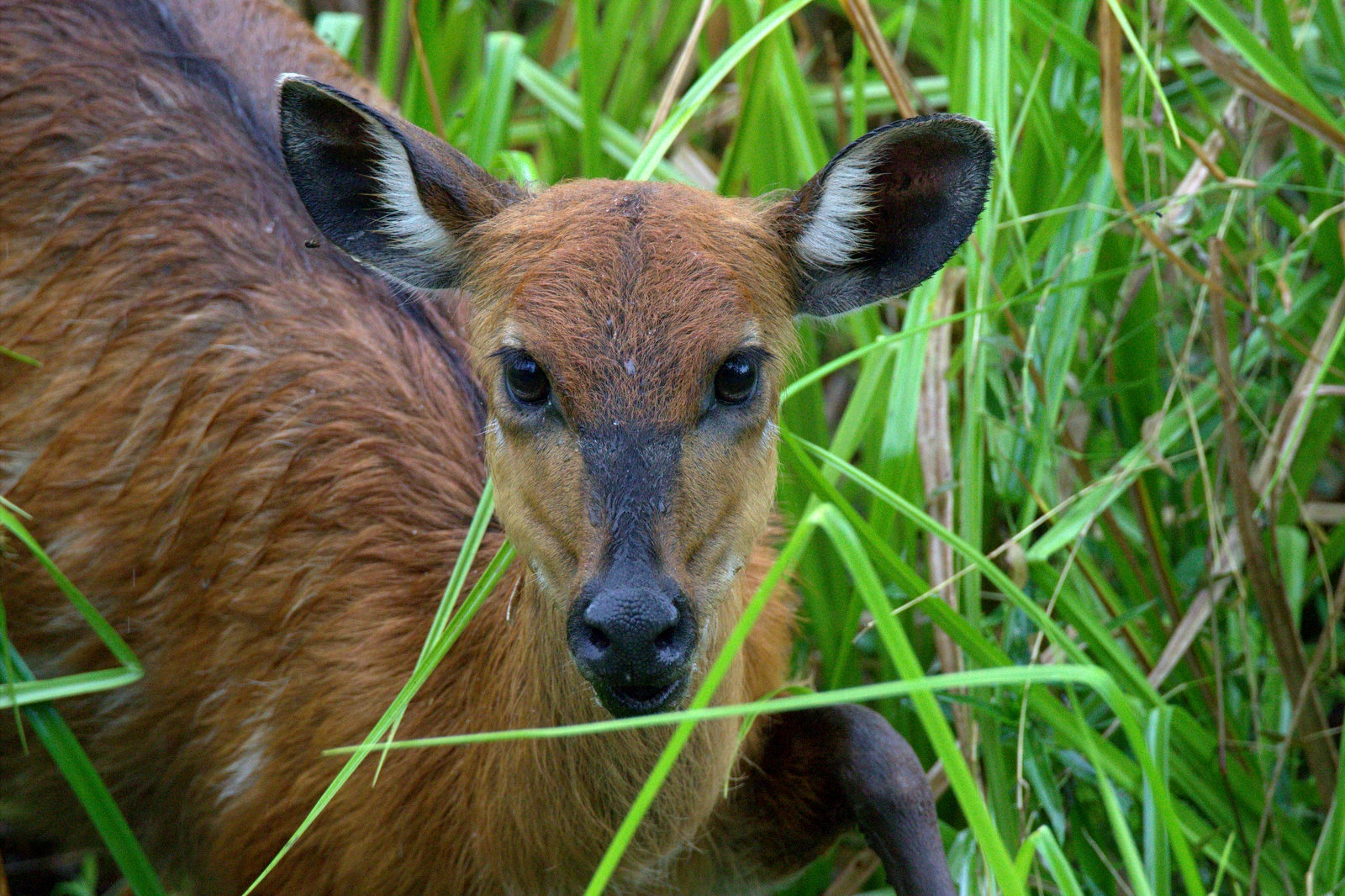
A female sitatunga.
