= Aepyceros datoadeni =

Aepyceros datoadeni Temporal range: Pliocene

Scientific classification
- Domain: Eukaryota
- Kingdom: Animalia
- Phylum: Chordata
- Class: Mammalia
- Order: Artiodactyla
- Family: Bovidae
- Tribe: Aepycerotini
- Genus: Aepyceros
- Species: †A. datoadeni

Binomial name
- †Aepyceros datoadeni Geraads et al., 2012

Extinct species of mammal

Aepyceros datoadeni is an extinct impala which lived in what is now Ethiopia during the Pliocene epoch around 3 million years ago. It was described by Denis Geraads, René Bobe and Kaye Reed in 2012. In most respects, including the shape of the horns and teeth, it very closely resembled the living impala, although it was significantly smaller.
