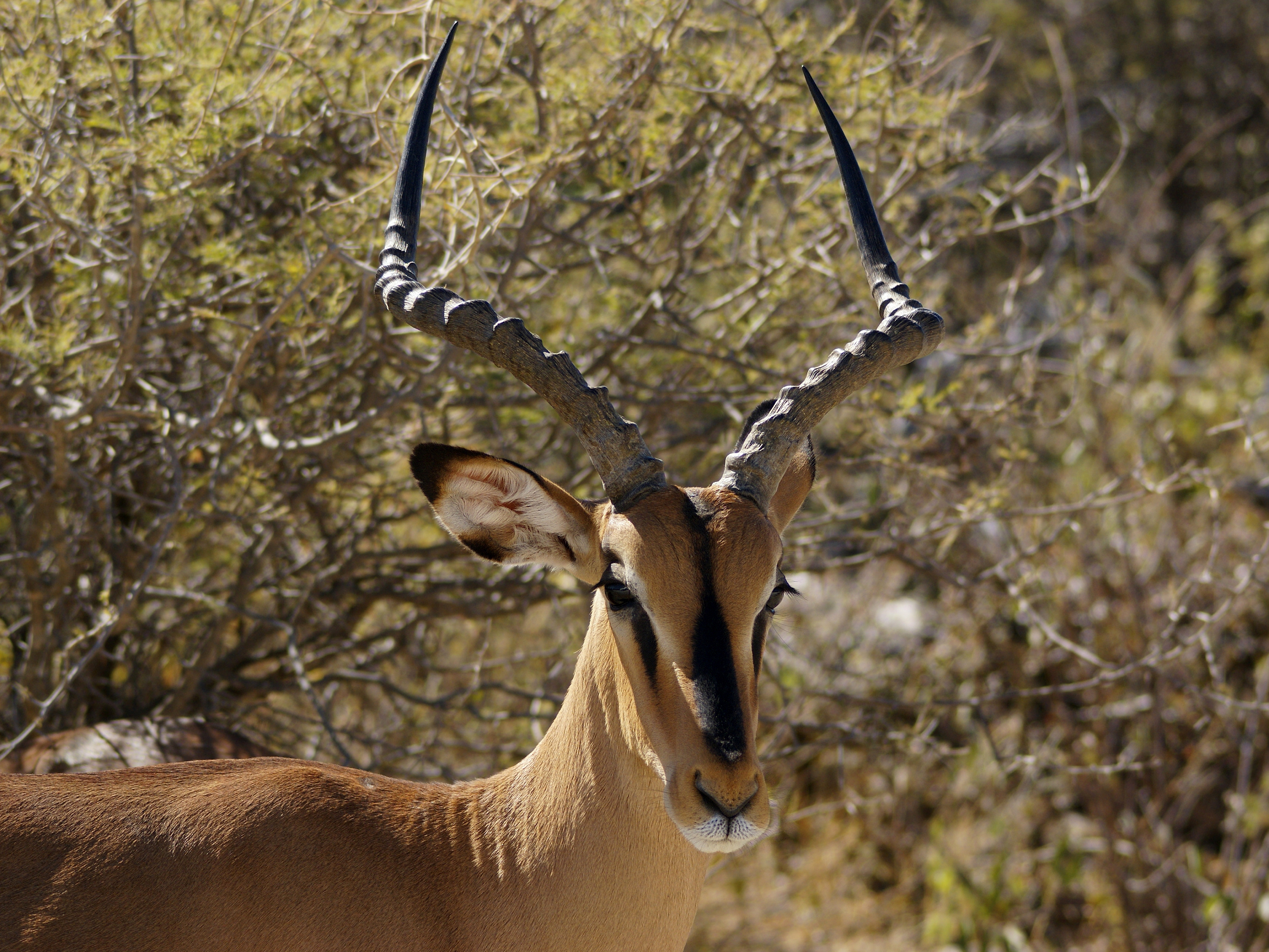
- Black-faced impala (Aepyceros melampus petersi)

Scientific classification
- Kingdom: Animalia
- Phylum: Chordata
- Class: Mammalia
- Order: Artiodactyla
- Family: Bovidae
- Subfamily: Aepycerotinae; Gray, 1872
- Tribe: Aepycerotini; Gray, 1872
- Genus: Aepyceros; Sundevall, 1847

Type species
- Antilope melampus Lichtenstein, 1812.

Species
- Aepyceros melampus - Impala †Aepyceros datoadeni †Aepyceros shungurae

= Aepyceros =

Aepyceros Temporal range: 3–0 Ma Pliocene – Recent

Genus of mammals

Aepyceros is a genus of African antelope that contains a single living species, the impala (Aepyceros melampus). It is the only living member of the tribe Aepycerotini.

Two extinct species are known, Aepyceros datoadeni and Aepyceros shungurae. A third species, Aepyceros premelampus has been transferred to a new genus, Afrotragus.

== Etymology ==
The generic name Aepyceros (lit. ‘high-horned’) comes from Ancient Greek αἰπύς (aipus, 'high, steep') + κέρας (keras, 'horn').
