= Kongou Falls =

Waterfall on the Ivindo River in Gabon

Coordinates: 0°17′26.66″N 12°35′20.58″E

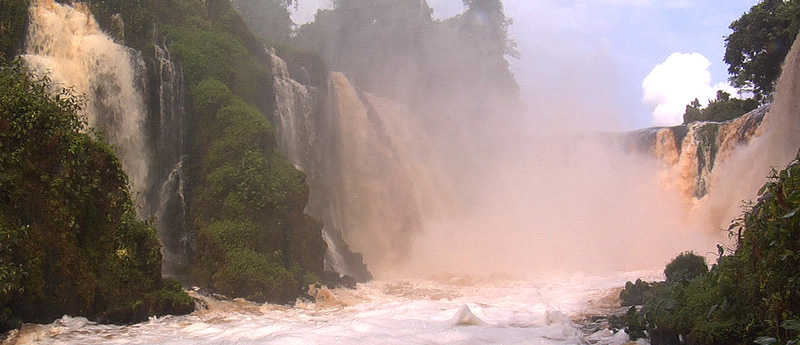
A section of the massive cataract that makes up these impressive falls Photo:Michael Dalton-Smith

Chutes Kongou (also called the Koungou Falls) is a massive cataract about 3.2 kilometres (2.0 mi) wide and up to 56 metres (184 ft) tall, located in Ivindo National Park in eastern Gabon. It is located on the Ivindo River and is one of the strongest-flowing waterfalls in the world with an average flow of 900 cubic metres per second (32,000 cu ft/s).

This part of the Ivindo River is a major centre of fish biodiversity. The falls are within Ivindo National Park, created in 2002 to protect among other things this beautiful and biologically diverse stretch of river.

== Proposed dam ==
On 14 September 2007, President Omar Bongo Ondimba of Gabon confirmed that a dam would be built at the falls to provide electricity to a large iron mining project in Belinga further north. The iron mine is essentially for Gabon's economic development, but the dam will inundate a large part of the National Park, and have a serious impact on local livelihoods. Old studies indicate that there are other sites on the river where a dam would be easier to build and the environmental and social impacts would be much less than at Kongou, but no Environmental impact assessment was done before the decision was made. The decision put into question the President's strategy of developing ecotourism in Gabon and may well deter investors and tourists alike.

It is claimed that the construction of the dam with no prior environmental impact study or proper consultation was a sign of the growing power of the Minister of Mines and Petrol at a time when President Bongo's power was declining. Due to opposition from the Gabonese people this project has been stopped.

== See also ==
- List of waterfalls
- List of waterfalls by flow rate
