= Mabula Game Reserve =

Private game reserve in Limpopo, South Africa

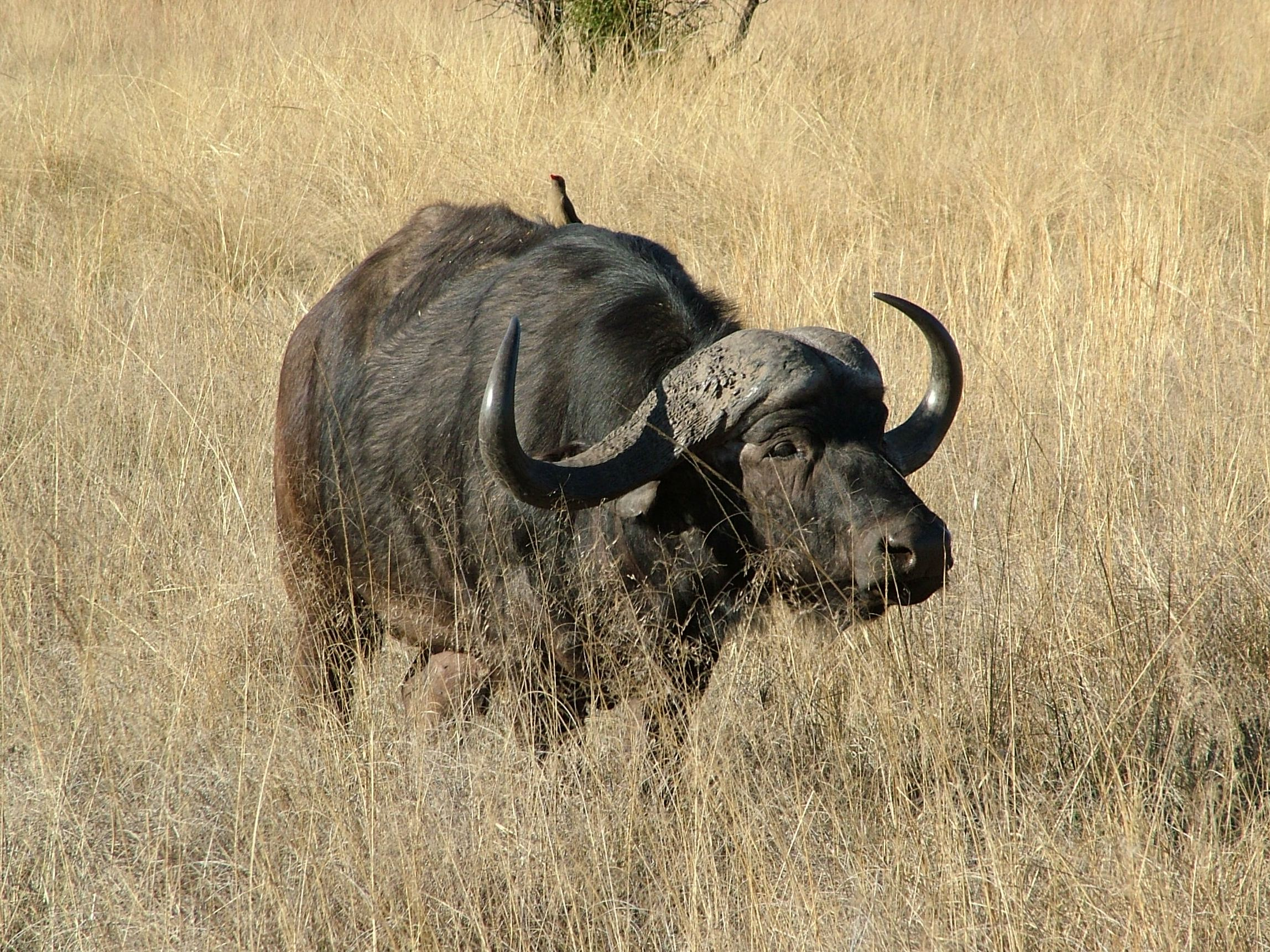
- Buffalo in Mabula Game Reserve

- Location within South Africa
- Location: Limpopo, South Africa
- Nearest city: Bela Bela
- Coordinates: 24.734525°S 27.927246°E
- Area: 12 000 ha
- Governing body: Mabula Game Reserve
- Website: http://www.mabula.com

Mabula Game Reserve is a private game reserve situated in the Limpopo province of South Africa. It is about 12,000 hectares (30,000 acres) in area and is about 47 km from Bela Bela (Warmbaths).

== Wildlife ==
The list of species found in the reserve includes sixty mammals, three hundred birds, one hundred plants and numerous reptiles and insects.

Wildlife includes the big five game animals, as well as the group of small animals called the little five.

Apart from these, the following mammals can be seen here:

Hedgehog, lesser bushbaby, vervet monkey, chacma baboon, pangolin, scrub hare, tree squirrel, spring hare, greater cane rat, porcupine, black-backed jackal, striped polecat, honey badger, Cape clawless otter, African civet, large spotted genet, small spotted genet, yellow mongoose, marsh mongoose, slender mongoose, white-tailed mongoose, banded mongoose, aardwolf, brown hyena, cheetah, caracal, serval, Southern African wildcat, black-footed cat, aardvark, rock hyrax, Burchell's zebra, bushpig, common warthog, hippo, giraffe, klipspringer, common duiker, steenbok, blesbok, reedbuck, mountain reedbuck, impala, springbok, blue wildebeest, tsessebe, red hartebeest, gemsbok, waterbuck, bushbuck, nyala, kudu, eland, and wild dogs.

== Accommodation ==
- The main lodge is called Mabula Game Lodge. It has 53 thatched chalets each with its own bathroom. There are also some conference facilities, restaurant, bar, playrooms, etc.
- Modjadji Camp, deeper into the bush, with its own swimming pool and tennis courts.
- Kwafubesi Tented Safari Camp.

== See also ==
- Protected areas of South Africa
