= Wildlife of Angola =

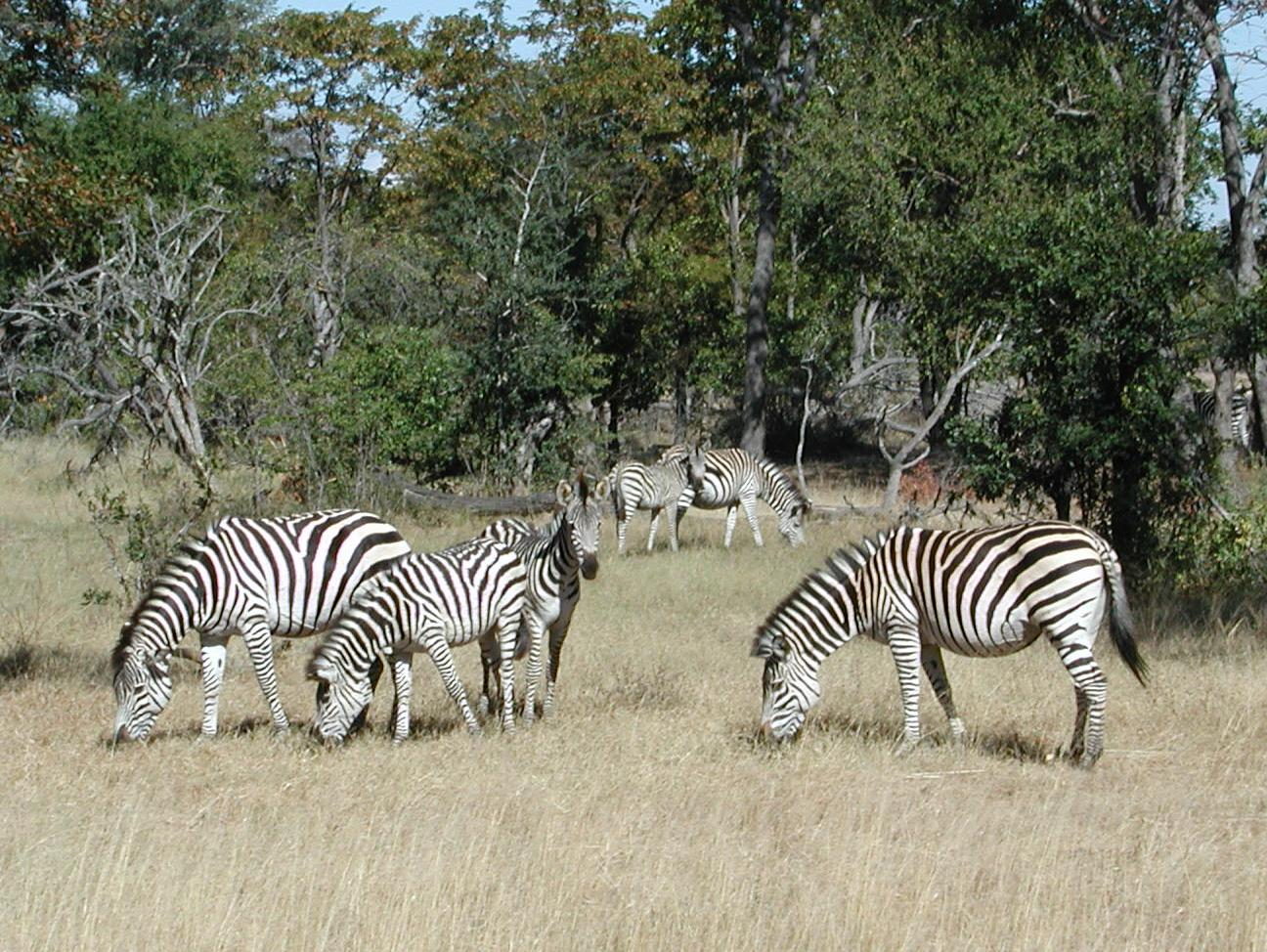
Plains zebra in Mosi-oa-Tunya National Park

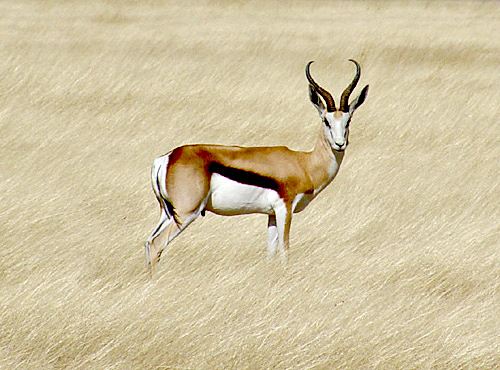
Springbok in Etosha National Park

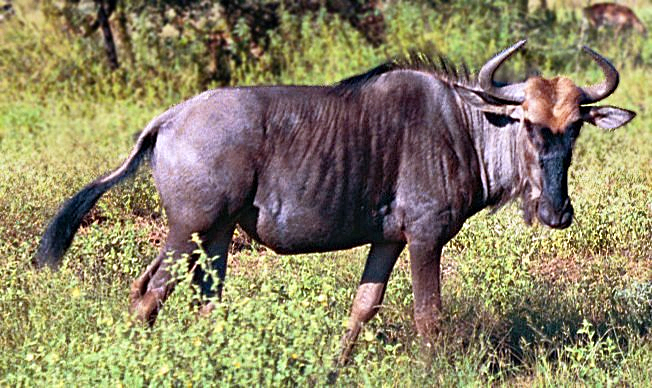
Wildebeest in Kruger National Park

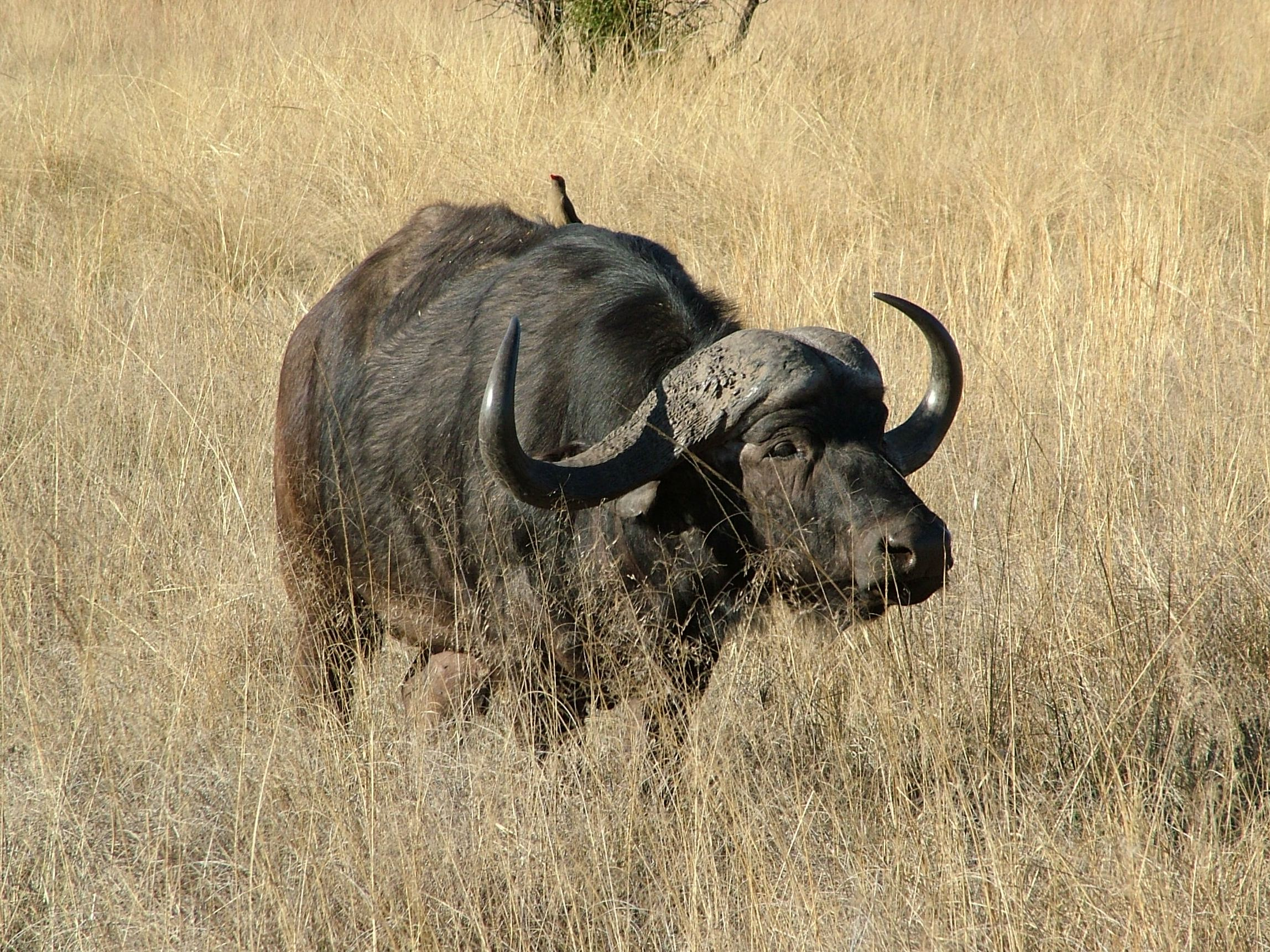
African buffalo in Mabula Game Reserve

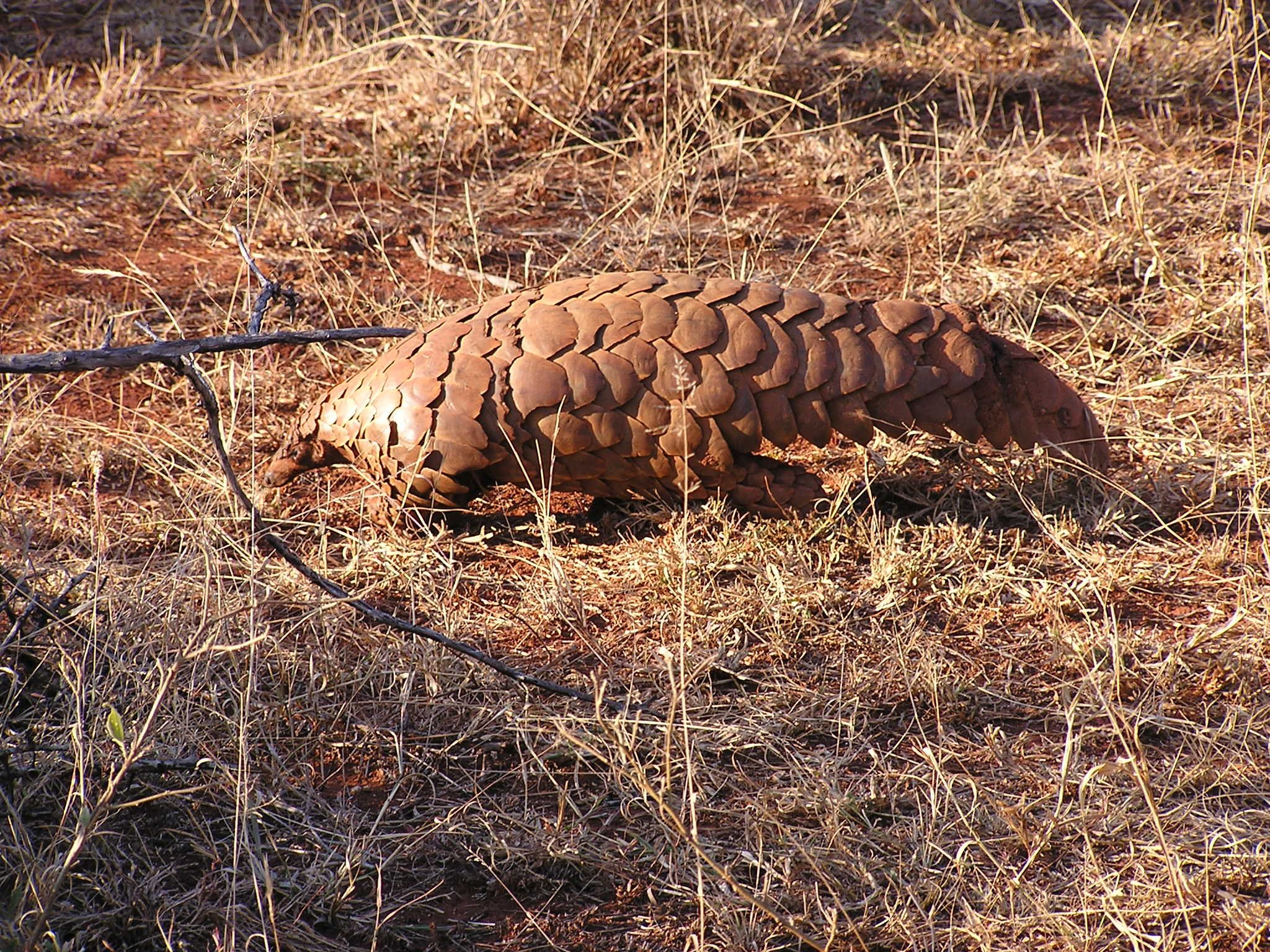
Ground pangolin in Madikwe Game Reserve

The wildlife of Angola is composed of its flora and fauna.

An atlas of the amphibians and reptiles of Angola was published in 2018, and reported 117 species of amphibians and 278 of reptiles.

A major book on the biodiversity of Angola was published in 2019, and reported more than 2,000 species of organisms (plants, invertebrates and vertebrate animals), and 1,313 fossil species.

== Fauna ==
=== Birds ===
The avifauna of Angola includes a total of 983 species, of which 14 are endemic, 1 has been introduced by humans, and 4 are rare or accidental. 20 species are globally threatened.

The western Angola Endemic Bird Area has 14 range-restricted species. Little is known about the conservation status of the region's birds due to the Angolan Civil War from 1975 until 2002. The greatest diversity of restricted-range species is found in Cuanza Sul Province, and given the uncertainty about their current status, many of these species are listed as threatened. Gabela bushshrikes (Laniarius amboimensis) are common and Monteiro's bushshrikes (Malaconotus monteiri) are fairly common in degraded secondary forest, old coffee plantations and primary forest at Kumbira. Pulitzer's longbills (Macrosphenus pulitzeri) are fairly common at higher elevations at Kumbira as well as in the dense understorey of secondary forest west of Seles. Angola cave chats ((Xenocopsychus ansorgei) are found on the rocky slopes above the forest at Kumbira.

=== Reptiles ===
There are currently at least 278 species of reptiles recorded in the country.

=== Amphibians ===
There are currently 117 species of amphibians recorded in Angola.

== Flora ==
Angola had a 2018 Forest Landscape Integrity Index mean score of 8.35/10, ranking it 23rd globally out of 172 countries. In Angola forest cover is around 53% of the total land area, equivalent to 66,607,380 ha (257,172.5 sq mi; 164,590,400 acres) of forest in 2020, down from 79,262,780 ha (306,035.3 sq mi; 195,862,600 acres) in 1990. In 2020, naturally regenerating forest covered 65,800,190 ha (254,056.0 sq mi; 162,595,800 acres) and planted forest covered 807,200 ha (3,117 sq mi; 1,995,000 acres). Of the naturally regenerating forest 40% was reported to be primary forest (consisting of native tree species with no clearly visible indications of human activity) and around 3% of the forest area was found within protected areas. For the year 2015, 100% of the forest area was reported to be under public ownership.

The southern and central coasts include the welwitschia, a primitive conifer. The grassy savanna around Lobito includes baobab and euphorbia trees.

The Huambo, Benguela and Huíla provinces are home to montane forest with rare flora.

The grassy savanna in the north includes miombo woodland and some evergreen forest.
