= J. Michael Fay =

American ecologist and conservationist

J. Michael Fay (born September 1956, Plainfield, New Jersey) is an American ecologist and conservationist notable for, among other things, the MegaTransect, in which he spent 455 days walking 2,000 miles (3,200 km) across Africa and the MegaFlyover in which he and pilot Peter Ragg spent months flying 70,000 miles in a small plane at low altitude, taking photographs every twenty seconds. Both projects were sponsored by the National Geographic Society, which produced articles and documentaries about the projects.

== Biography ==
Fay graduated in 1978 from the University of Arizona, and then joined the Peace Corps working in Tunisia and the Central African Republic. In 1984 he joined the Missouri Botanical Garden. He completed his doctorate on the western lowland gorilla in 1997, while also surveying large forest blocks by aeroplane and working to create and manage the Dzanga-Sangha park and the Nouabalé-Ndoki National Park in the Central African Republic and Republic of the Congo. He has worked for the Wildlife Conservation Society since 1990, and was an Explorer in Residence at the National Geographic Society.

In 2006, Fay and National Geographic photographer Michael Nichols traveled to Zakouma National Park to document the danger poachers create for the world's largest remaining concentration of elephants. Their trip resulted in Ivory Wars, Last Stand in Zakouma. He has testified before the United States Congress on the need for preservation of wildlife and habitat.

As of 2022, he is working on conservation projects in Gabon with the Agence Nationale Des Parcs Nationaux.

== See also ==
- 2006 Zakouma elephant slaughter
- MegaTransect
