= MegaTransect =

1999 ecological survey of Africa

MegaTransect was the name for a project conducted in Africa in 1999 by J. Michael Fay to spend 465 days on the expedition hike of 2,000 miles (3,219 kilometers) across the Congo Basin of Africa to survey the ecological and environmental status of the region.

A transect is a term in ecology that denotes a survey of the natural vegetation through a particular area. The concept of a megatransect was conceived as a vegetation transect on a large scale that could be used to take an ecological census of the natural vegetation and ecosystems.

Shortly after the hike, Fay successfully lobbied alongside the President of Gabon to create 13 new national parks. In 2002, US Secretary of State Colin Powell and other Bush administration members gave 53 million dollars to help preserve the Congo Basin.

Mike Fay later went on to carry out the MegaFlyover in 2004.

== Madagascar megatransect ==
Also in 2004, an international team conducted a "Megatransect" of the island of Madagascar. Dubbed "Hike Madagascar", the journey covered the entire island. Members met with rural farmers to help them improve their agricultural techniques and discuss their impact on the environment.

== History of US megatransects ==
One of the first megatransects in the United States was conducted by Dr. Robert R. Humphrey when he rephotographed 535 miles of the natural vegetation along the United States and Mexico border at the 1890s permanent border monument locations, each spaced about five miles apart, and published this work in 90 Years and 535 Miles: Vegetation Changes Along the Mexican Border (1987, pub. Univ. of NM Press, 448 pages).

In 1997 Craig C. Dremann conducted a megatransect surveying over 3,000 miles and at each mile-marker, noting the roadside vegetation, the perennial native grass, and exotic grass status throughout the Great Basin ecosystem. The route was from Reno, Nevada eastward to Hot Springs, South Dakota, and from South Dakota through Wyoming, Idaho, Nevada, and California, returning westward to Bishop, California, and then north back to Reno.

In 2005, Dremann conducted another vegetation megatransect, this time of the California portion of the Mojave desert, mapping over 1,000 miles on a mile-by-mile basis, for a fast-spreading exotic mustard species, Brassica tournefortii, noting the locations and density of the Mojave desert Mustard infestation in California.

Dremann suggests that a method of remotely conducting a large-scale vegetation megatransect is with photographs. Photographs that have been taken at ground-level at intervals from known locations can be stitched together to create large-scale to continent-scale megatransect pictures of ecosystems.

In 2006, Dr. Michael C. McGrann and his wife Amy M. McGrann hiked the length of the California section of Pacific Crest National Scenic Trail (PCT) in the western United States from Mexico to the Oregon border (2,736 km) while systematically collecting avian-habitat data on 3,578 survey plots separated by 10-minute hiking intervals. This work was completed in a single field season from 2 April to 8 September. From this data, Dr. McGrann and his collaborators described the elevation and latitudinal distributions of birds along the PCT and statistically modeled avian species richness relationships with elevation, climate, and environmental factors including temperature, precipitation, and primary productivity. The results from this work showed that birds can exhibit heterogeneous relationships to temperature, precipitation, and productivity depending on the distinct environmental and climate conditions of each of the ecological regions traversed by the PCT. The PCT megatransect is an ongoing research project for Dr. McGrann in collaboration with several other researchers. He has continued his biodiversity surveys along sections of the PCT in 2007, 2010, and 2015, and he is working both to expand taxa surveyed along the PCT and to involve his undergraduate students at William Jessup University in the PCT Mega-Transect.

In 2007–2008 J. Michael Fay and Lindsey Holm completed a 1300-mile Redwood Transect of 333 days. This was a megatransect that spanned from the southernmost to the northernmost redwood trees in California and Oregon. They walked extensively on private timberland and public land recording data on historical exploitation, current forest stand characteristics, silviculture, and many other aspects of the redwood ecosystem. The results will be published in National Geographic in 2009.

The Appalachian Trail Conservancy and the National Park Service are adopting the idea of a megatransect for the Appalachian Trail (A.T.) Like other megatransects, the A.T. MEGA-Transect aims to monitor the natural resources along the trail, understand the status and trends of these resources, and inform and engage the public and stakeholders. The 2,178-mile-long trail crosses 14 states, from Georgia to Maine, and is visited by one to two million people and completed by about 400 people each year. Volunteer citizen scientists are beginning to implement monitoring protocols to track natural resources such as wildlife presence, water quality, forest health, invasive plants, endangered species, mountain birds, phenology, and air quality. Professional scientists are also using the transect for independent research. The A.T. is oriented along the predicted migratory direction of species responding to climate change, making it a particularly important megatransect to establish and maintain.

== MegaTransect future ==
For a rapidly changing planet, megatransects establish baseline data from which to draw future trends, and they can focus attention on particular ecosystems which are disappearing faster than others.

Establishing standard megatransects on specific regions or through various ecosystems of each continent, and periodic re–measurement of the ecological conditions along routes, every five to ten years, would provide valuable measured data on environmental trends.

== See also ==
- Transect
