= Nature's Valley =

Holiday resort and village in South Africa

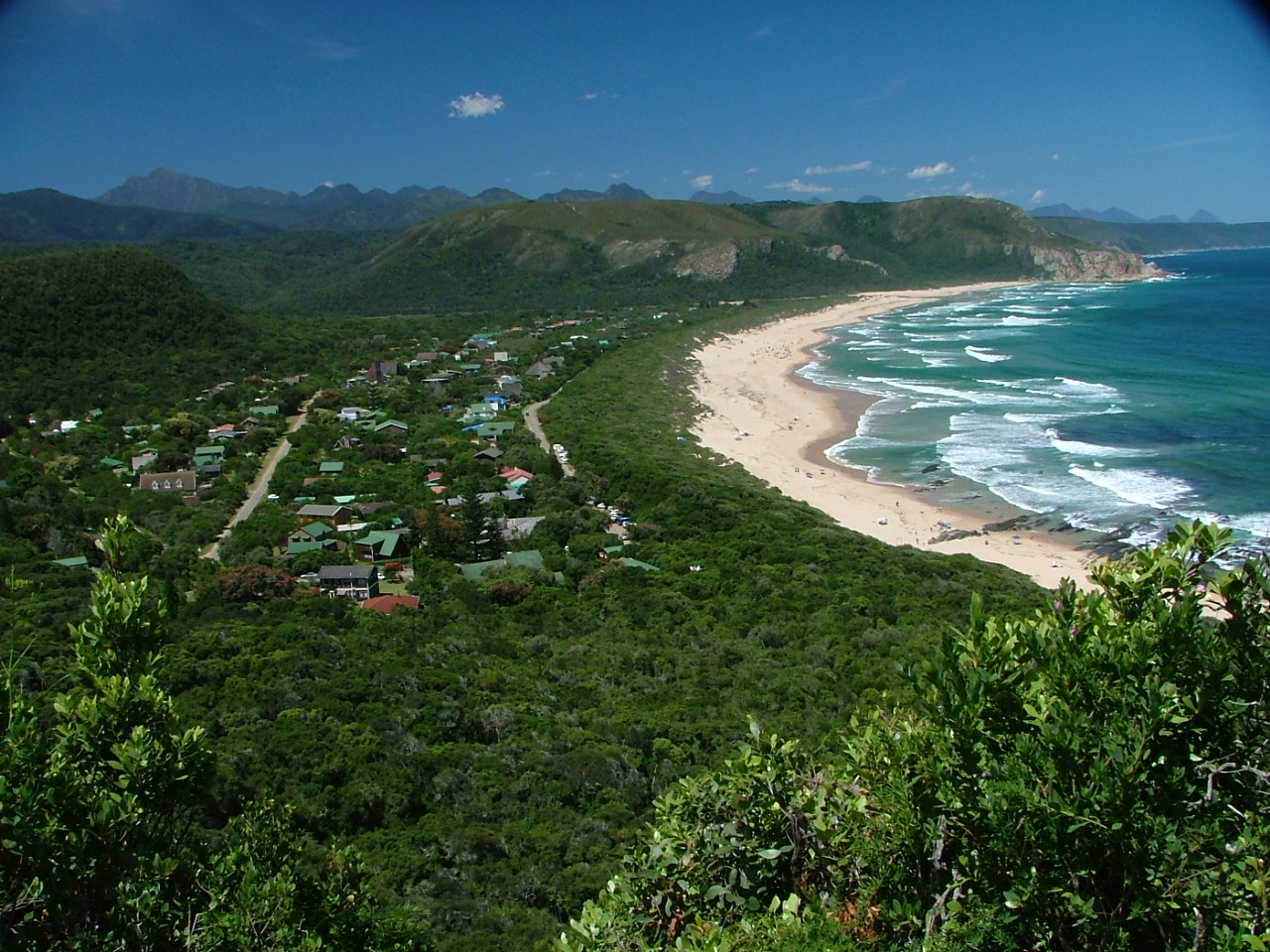
- Nature's Valley with the Tsitsikamma Mountains on the horizon

- Location within Western Cape Location within South Africa
- Coordinates: 33°58′50″S 23°33′33″E
- Country: South Africa
- Province: Western Cape
- District: Garden Route
- Municipality: Bitou

Area
  - Total: 1.14 km^{2} (0.44 sq mi)

Population (2011)
  - Total: 460
  - Density: 400/km^{2} (1,000/sq mi)

Racial makeup (2011)
  - Black African: 53.7%
  - Coloured: 11.5%
  - Indian/Asian: 2.0%
  - White: 32.4%
  - Other: 0.4%

First languages (2011)
  - Afrikaans: 60.4%
  - English: 28.9%
  - Xhosa: 5.7%
  - S. Ndebele: 2.5%
  - Other: 2.5%
- Time zone: UTC+2 (SAST)
- Postal code (street): 6600
- Area code: 044

Nature's Valley is a holiday resort and small village on the Garden Route along the southern Cape coast of South Africa. Nature's Valley lies between the Salt River, the foothills of the Tsitsikamma Mountains, the Indian Ocean and the Groot River lagoon. Nature's Valley has a balmy climate and is surrounded by the de Vasselot Nature Reserve which is part of the Tsitsikamma Park, and in turn part of the Garden Route National Park.

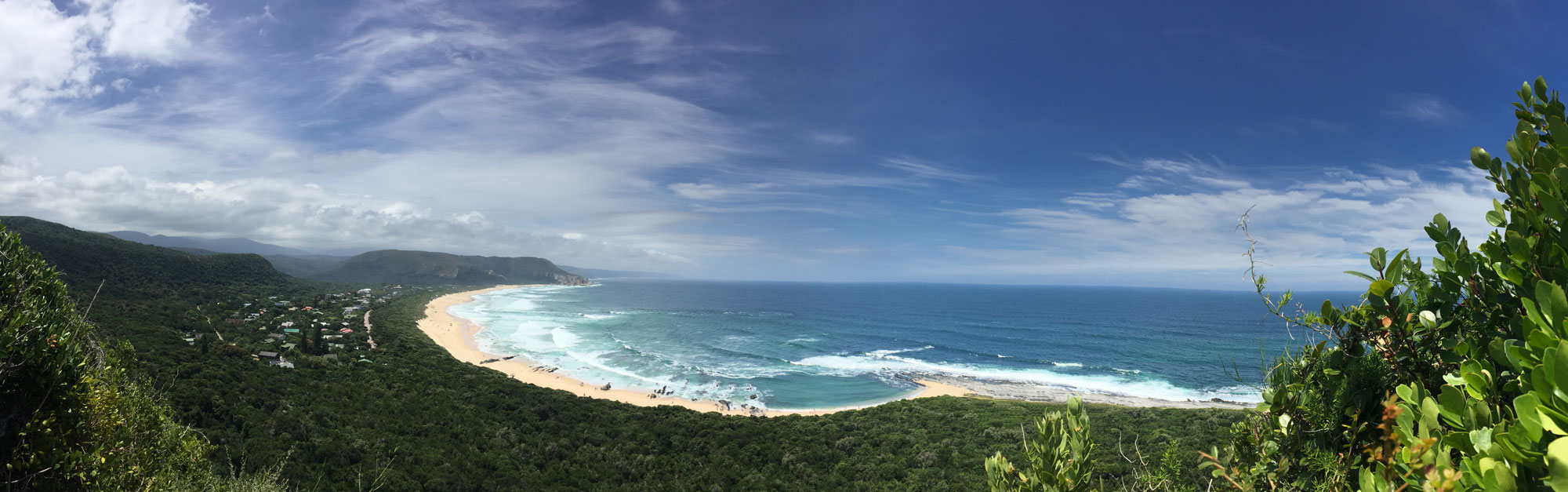

== History ==
Nature's Valley, and the surrounding coastline, was occupied by Old Stone Age or Paleolithic man from 1 million years ago. Paleolithic man lived in the area in caves and under overhangs, collecting food in the tidal zone and hunting for a rich variety of wildlife. Various glacial periods interrupted this coastal occupation. San hunter-gatherers lived in this area from about 10,000 years ago until they were displaced by Khoikhoi herders from the interior.

=== The Groot River pass ===
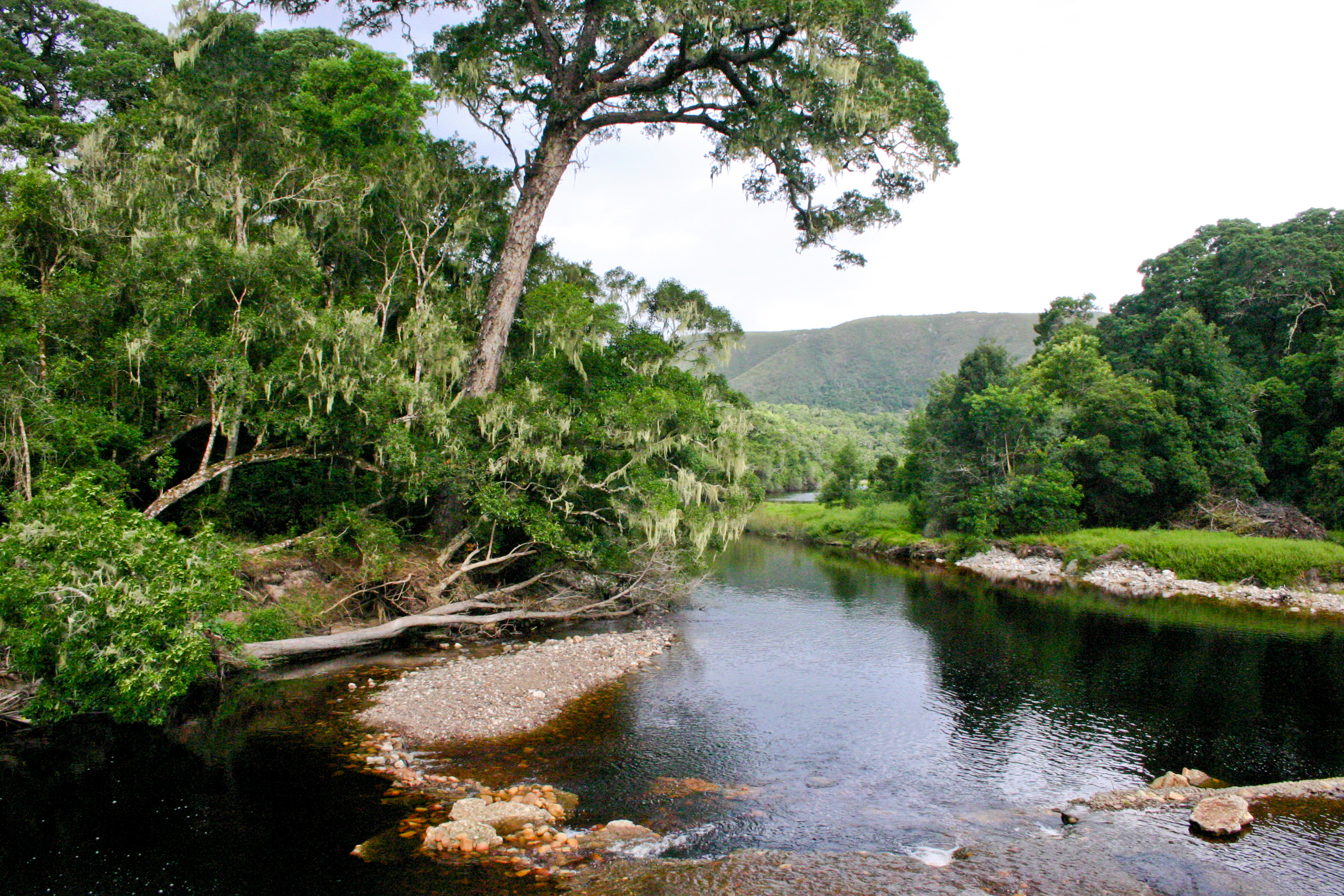
View of the Groot River

For a long time travel along the Garden Route parallel to the coastline was impossible, due to the extremely deep and precipitous river gorges blocking all east–west traffic. Charles Collier Michell reported in 1839: "there is no practical way – not even a footpath, from Plettenberg Bay to the Tzitzikamma country". Thomas Bain built a road from George to Knysna, the so-called "Seven Passes Road", which took from 1867 to 1883 to complete. Previously, access to the coastal area which lay further east was possible only via the Langkloof valley, which lies immediately north of the Tsitsikamma Mountains.

Nature's Valley only became easily accessible after Thomas Bain completed the Grootrivier Pass in 1880. He and Captain Christopher Harison (later Conservator of Forests) first explored the route in 1868 to test its feasibility. Harison's interest in the road stemmed from his belief that it could be used to halt the runaway destruction of the forest started by Dutch East India Company woodcutters in 1777 and carried on by their descendants. At the time that Bain and Harison reconnoitred the route, Bain was supervising the construction of no fewer than six passes, so that 10 years would elapse before he could start work on the Groot River Pass. A hundred years later the demands of road transport would dictate the building of a freeway with enormous concrete bridges – a tribute to the skill of engineers, and bringing in its wake considerable collateral damage to the environment.

=== Permanent settlement ===
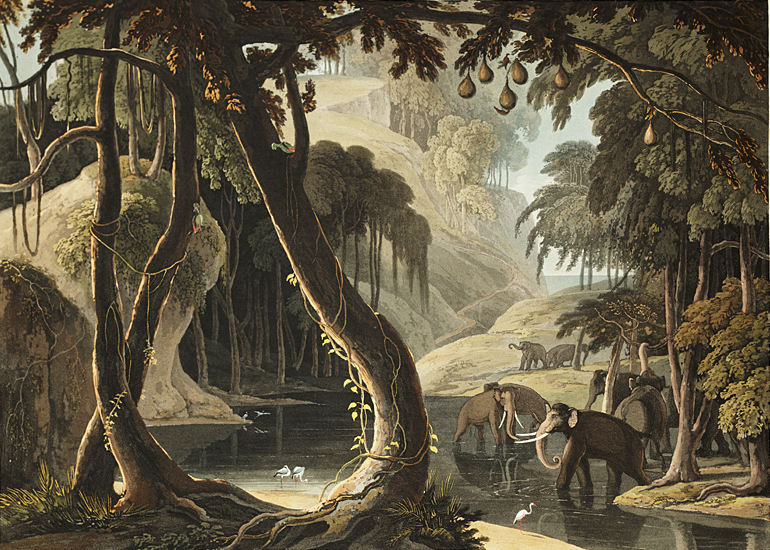
A Scene in Sitsikamma, fanciful 1801 painting by Samuel Daniell showing Asian elephants in the Tsitsikamma Forest

After Bain's completion of the Groot River Pass, the Forestry Department proclaimed three lots in the Valley – one for its own use and the other two sold to private individuals. The first person to settle in the now accessible valley, acquired a 69-hectare lot from Telfer Anderson was Hendrik Jacobus Hermanus Barnardo [also referred to as Hendrick Grootrivier] {uncle of Ignatius Phillip(Naas) Barnardo} who had been a foreman at Bain's Groot River construction camp. Barnardo was an enigmatic character who went to extreme lengths to protect the trees of the area, but enthusiastically led the slaughter of wildlife throughout the region. Barnardo married three times and fathered 19 children.

The names of his wife's,

Magaretha Johanna (Grieta) Van Rooyen; with children(6), Michael John, Christian Henry, Susan Carolina Brown, Micheal Cornelius, Babes en Susie

Jacomina Hendrika (Jackie) Stroebel; with children(8), Harding Jouy, Herculina Henrieta, Isabella Cornelia, Johanna Jacomina Stroebel, Gerhardus Johannes, Herculeen Easy

Luanna Tait; with children(7),Tait, Maggie, Willem, Eddy, Leon, Benny, Ivy. They lived at Covie, just opposite the graveyard. Another member of his family shot the last Tsitsikamma elephant in 1881.

In the face of continued pressure to sell a portion of his farm, Barnardo finally relented in 1941 and sold an area of 1.6963 morgen to a syndicate of ten buyers for the sum of £755. In 1943 Baron Ulrich Behr of Kurland bought the option to purchase the remainder of Barnardo's property from the Van Reenen family, who had acquired the option in the 1920s, but had never exercised it. Behr then went through all the steps necessary to have the land proclaimed for development. In 1953 the township was declared and formally named "Nature's Valley" by Behr, a name that had been used by the syndicate at the suggestion of Wide du Preez of "The Crags".

== The Valley and surrounding area ==
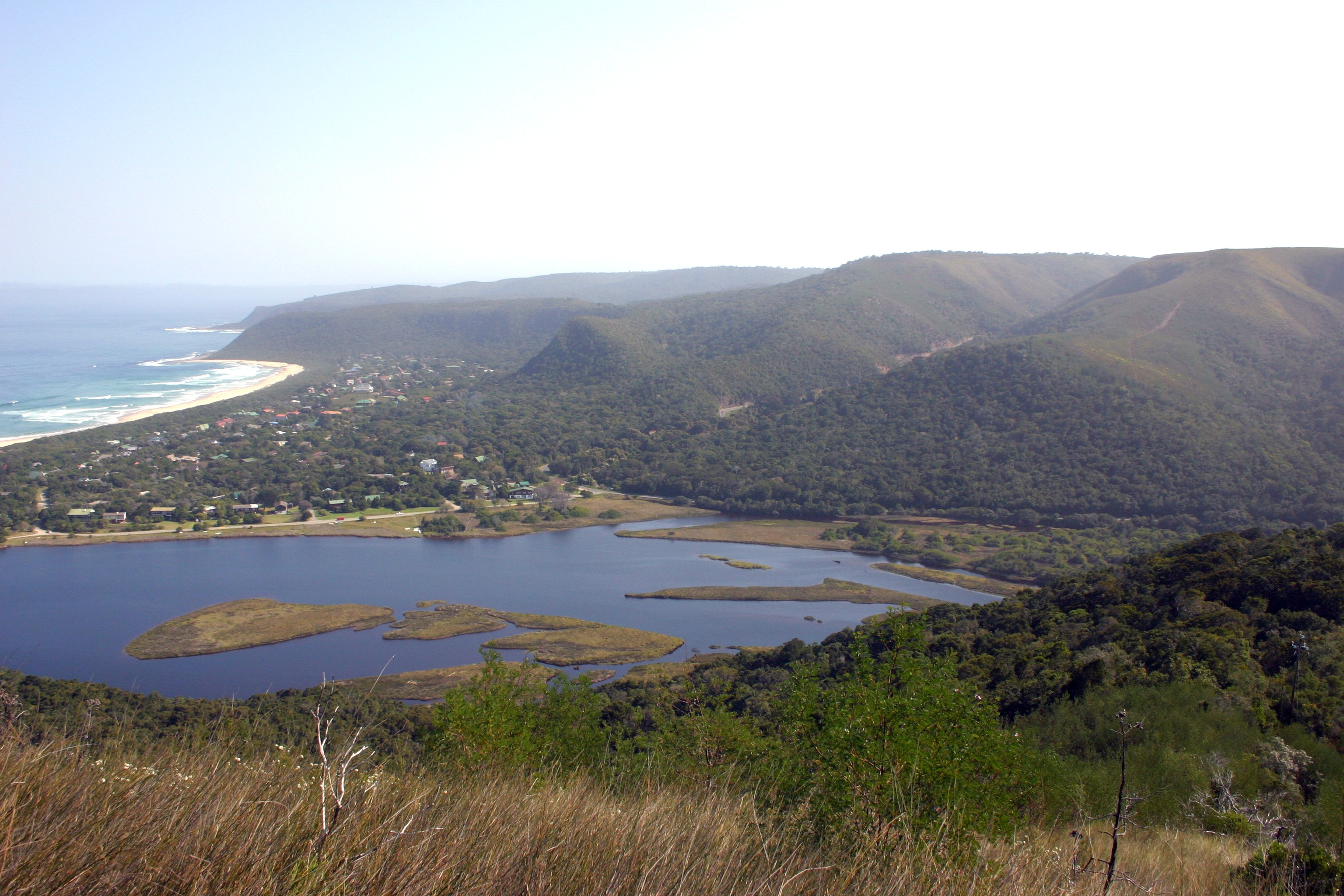
Groot River lagoon and Nature's Valley

A network of trails covers the surrounding hills and beaches. The lagoon offers sheltered water for sailing and canoeing, without powerboating and beach buggies. A walk along beaches and a rocky path leads to the Salt River Mouth after crossing Pebble Beach, a large area completely covered in sea-smoothed cobbles.

East of Nature's Valley is the Groot River Lagoon, which marks the end of the Otter Trail, starting at Storms River Mouth, 60 km further east. This 5-day trail is considered by many hikers to be the finest in South Africa, being strenuous, scenic and extremely varied. The route meanders along the coast through evergreen forest, past boulder-strewn beaches and frequently crossing tannin-stained streams. Huts are available for the hiker at the end of each day, but bookings have to be made well in advance.

The Brenton blue butterfly, Orachrysops niobe, was first described from Knysna by Roland Trimen in 1858, and was not seen again until discovered in 1977 at Nature's Valley and shortly thereafter in 1979 at Brenton-on-Sea. The Nature's Valley population was assumed to be extinct when no more sightings were made after 1984. The cause of this decline was felt to be the absence of fynbos fires causing a shortage of the butterfly's foodplant Indigofera erecta, and accordingly a controlled burn was carried out in April 2003, with a reintroduction of butterfly eggs in August 2005.

In 2000 researchers from the Albany Museum in Grahamstown discovered a number of aquatic insect species new to science in the Salt River, which lies at the western end of Nature's Valley. The isolated position of the river, a lack of fish and its acidic and unpolluted water are thought to have been factors in ensuring the undisturbed survival of these primitive forms. New housing developments within the catchment area of the Salt River may threaten the continued existence of these unique insects.

== Wildlife ==
=== Mammals ===
- Duthie's golden mole, Chlorotalpa duthieae
- Hottentot golden mole, Amblysomus hottentotus devilliersi
- Amblysomus iris
- Forest shrew, Myosorex varius
- Greater red musk shrew, Crocidura flavescens
- Egyptian fruit bat, Rousettus aegyptiacus leachii
- Geoffroy's horseshoe bat, Rhinolophus clivosus
- Cape horseshoe bat, Rhinolophus capensis
- Egyptian slit-faced bat, Nycteris thebaica
- Lesser long-fingered bat, Miniopterus fraterculus
- Lesser woolly bat, Kerivoula lanosa
- Cape hairy bat, Myotis tricolor
- Kuhl's pipistrelle, Pipistrellus kuhlii
- Long-tailed house bat, Eptesicus hottentotus
- Vervet monkey, Cercopithecus pygerythrus
- Chacma baboon, Papio ursinus
- Scrub hare, Lepus saxatilis
- Verreaux's mouse, Myomyscus verreauxi
- Woodland thicket rat, Thamnomys dolichurus
- Vlei rat, Otomys irroratus
- Brant's climbing mouse, Dendromus mesomelas
- Spectacled dormouse, Graphiurus ocularis
- Woodland dormouse, Graphiurus murinus
- Cape porcupine, Hystrix africae-australis
- Cape dune mole-rat, Bathyergus suillus
- Cape mole-rat, Georychus capensis
- Common mole-rat, Cryptomys hottentotus
- Honey badger, Mellivora capensis
- Striped polecat, Ictonyx striatus
- African clawless otter, Aonyx capensis
- Cape genet, Genetta tigrina
- Egyptian mongoose, Herpestes ichneumon cafer
- Cape grey mongoose, Herpestes pulverulentus
- Marsh mongoose, Atilax paludinosus
- African wildcat, Felis lybica
- Serval, Leptailurus serval
- Caracal, Caracal caracal
- Leopard, Panthera pardus
- African bush elephant, Loxodonta africana
- Cape hyrax, Procavia capensis
- Bushpig, Potamochoerus porcus
- Grey rhebok, Pelea capreolus
- Bushbuck, Tragelaphus scriptus sylvaticus
- Blue duiker, Cephalophus monticola
- Klipspringer, Oreotragus oreotragus
- Cape grysbok, Raphicerus melanotis

=== Birds ===
- Cape spurfowl
- Red-necked spurfowl
- Common quail
- Helmeted guineafowl
- Egyptian goose
- African black duck
- Yellow-billed duck
- Red-billed teal
- Scaly-throated honeyguide
- Greater honeyguide
- Lesser honeyguide
- Brown-backed honeybird
- Knysna woodpecker
- Cardinal woodpecker
- Olive woodpecker
- Crowned hornbill
- African hoopoe
- Green wood hoopoe
- Narina trogon
- European roller
- Half-collared kingfisher
- Malachite kingfisher
- Brown-hooded kingfisher
- Giant kingfisher
- Pied kingfisher
- Speckled mousebird
- Red-faced mousebird
- Red-chested cuckoo
- Black cuckoo
- Klaas's cuckoo
- African emerald cuckoo
- Diederik cuckoo
- Burchell's coucal
- Alpine swift
- African black swift
- Little swift
- Horus swift
- White-rumped swift
- Knysna turaco
- Barn owl
- Cape eagle-owl
- Spotted eagle-owl
- African wood owl
- Fiery-necked nightjar
- European nightjar
- Rock dove
- Lemon dove
- Laughing dove
- Cape turtle dove
- Red-eyed dove
- Tambourine dove
- Emerald-spotted wood dove
- Speckled pigeon
- African olive pigeon
- Denham's bustard
- African finfoot
- Buff-spotted flufftail
- Striped flufftail
- Common moorhen
- Red-knobbed coot
- Common whimbrel
- Common greenshank
- Marsh sandpiper
- Wood sandpiper
- Common sandpiper
- Ruddy turnstone
- Sanderling
- Ruff
- Water thick-knee
- Spotted thick-knee
- African black oystercatcher
- Black-winged stilt
- Grey plover
- White-fronted plover
- Blacksmith lapwing
- Black-winged lapwing
- Arctic skua
- Kelp gull
- Grey-headed gull
- Caspian tern
- Swift tern
- Sandwich tern
- Roseate tern
- Common tern
- Arctic tern
- Osprey
- Black-winged kite
- African marsh harrier
- Black harrier
- African harrier-hawk
- African cuckoo-hawk
- African goshawk
- Little sparrowhawk
- Rufous-chested sparrowhawk
- Black sparrowhawk
- Palmnut vulture
- Steppe buzzard
- Forest buzzard
- Jackal buzzard
- Black eagle
- Booted eagle
- Martial eagle
- Long-crested eagle
- African crowned eagle
- African fish eagle
- Rock kestrel
- Peregrine falcon
- White-faced whistling duck
- Little grebe
- Red-tailed tropicbird
- Cape gannet
- African darter
- Reed cormorant
- Crowned cormorant
- White-breasted cormorant
- Cape cormorant
- Little egret
- Cattle egret
- Grey heron
- Black-headed heron
- Purple heron
- Green-backed heron
- Black-crowned night heron
- White-backed night heron
- Dwarf bittern
- Hamerkop
- Lesser flamingo
- Hadeda ibis
- African sacred ibis
- African spoonbill
- Great frigatebird
- African penguin
- Indian yellow-nosed albatross
- Southern giant petrel
- Pintado petrel
- Blue petrel
- White-chinned petrel
- Black-headed oriole
- Fork-tailed drongo
- Blue-mantled crested flycatcher
- African paradise flycatcher
- Black-backed puffback
- Southern tchagra
- Southern boubou
- Olive bushshrike
- Cape batis
- Cape crow
- Pied crow
- White-necked raven
- Southern fiscal
- Grey cuckooshrike
- Black cuckooshrike
- Barn swallow
- White-throated swallow
- Greater striped swallow
- Brown-throated martin
- Rock martin
- Common house martin
- Black saw-wing
- Cape bulbul
- Sombre greenbul
- Terrestrial brownbul
- Cape grassbird
- Victorin's warbler
- Long-billed crombec
- Little rush warbler
- Knysna warbler
- Yellow-throated woodland warbler
- Willow warbler
- Cape white-eye
- Grey-backed cisticola
- Levaillant's cisticola
- Neddicky
- Karoo prinia
- Bar-throated apalis
- Bleating warbler
- Cape rock thrush
- Olive thrush
- Southern black flycatcher
- Fiscal flycatcher
- Spotted flycatcher
- African dusky flycatcher
- White-starred robin
- Cape robin-chat
- Chorister robin-chat
- White-browed scrub robin
- African stonechat
- Red-winged starling
- Black-bellied starling
- Wattled starling
- Common starling
- Orange-breasted sunbird
- Grey sunbird
- Amethyst sunbird
- Malachite sunbird
- Collared sunbird
- Southern double-collared sunbird
- Greater double-collared sunbird
- Cape sugarbird
- Cape weaver
- Yellow bishop
- African quailfinch
- Swee waxbill
- Common waxbill
- African firefinch
- Pin-tailed whydah
- House sparrow
- Southern grey-headed sparrow
- Cape wagtail
- Cape canary
- Brimstone canary
- White-throated canary
- Protea seedeater
- Streaky-headed seedeater
- Cape siskin
- Golden-breasted bunting

=== Amphibians ===
- Breviceps fuscus - Plain rain frog/blaasoppie
- Amietophrynus rangeri – Ranger's toad
- Cacosternum boettgeri – Boettger's dainty frog
- Hyperolius horstockii – Arum frog
- Amietia fuscigula – Cape river frog
- Strongylopus bonaspei – Banded stream frog
- Strongylopus grayii – Gray's stream frog
- Tomopterna delalandii – Delalande's sand frog
- Xenopus laevis – African clawed frog

=== Snakes ===
- Pelamis platurus - yellow-bellied sea snake
- Rhinotyphlops lalandei – pink earth snake
- Leptotyphlops nigricans – black worm snake
- Lycodonomorphus rufulus – brown water snake
- Lycophidion capense - Cape wolf snake
- Lamprophis aurora – Aurora snake
- Lycodonomorphus inornatus – olive house snake
- Boaedon fuliginosus – brown house snake
- Philothamnus hoplogaster – green water snake
- Philothamnus natalensis – Natal green snake
- Prosymna sundevallii – southern shovel-snout snake
- Pseudaspis cana – mole snake
- Duberria lutrix – slug-eater snake
- Dasypeltis scabra – common egg-eater snake
- Crotaphopeltis hotamboeia – red-lipped snake
- Amplorhinus multimaculatus – reed snake
- Dispholidus typus – boomslang
- Psammophylax rhombeatus – spotted grass snake
- Psammophis crucifer – cross-marked grass snake
- Homoroselaps lacteus – spotted harlequin snake
- Hemachatus haemachatus – rinkhals
- Naja nivea – Cape cobra
- Causus rhombeatus – night adder
- Bitis arietans – puff adder
- Bitis atropos – berg adder
- Bitis albanica – hornsman adder

=== Lizards ===
- Pachydactylus geitjie - Ocellated thick-toed gecko
- Afrogecko porphyreus – Marbled leaf-toed gecko
- Lygodactylus capensis - Cape dwarf gecko
- Agama atra – Southern rock agama
- Bradypodion damaranum – Knysna dwarf chameleon
- Ninurta coeruleopunctatus – Blue-spotted girdled lizard
- Acontias meleagris - Cape legless skink
- Eremias lineocelata - Sand lizard
- Pedioplanis lineocellata - Spotted sand lizard
- Trachylepis capensis – Cape skink
- Trachylepis homalocephala - Red-sided skink
- Gerrhosaurus flavigularis - Yellow-throated plated lizard
- Tetradactylus seps - Short-legged seps
- Chamaesaura anguina - Cape grass lizard
- Cordylus cordylus - Cape girdled lizard
- Pseudocordylus microlepidotus - Cape crag lizard
- Tropidosaura gularis - Yellow-striped mountain lizard
- Varanus exanthematicus - Rock monitor

=== Tortoises, turtles and terrapins ===
- Eretmochelys imbricata - Hawksbill sea turtle
- Chelonia mydas - Green turtle
- Caretta caretta - loggerhead turtle
- Dermochelys coriacea - leatherback turtle
- Stigmochelys pardalis - leopard tortoise
- Chersina angulata - angulate tortoise
- Homopus areolatus - common padloper
- Pelomedusa subrufa - marsh terrapin

=== Trees, shrubs and lianes ===
- Acokanthera oppositifolia
- Afrocanthium mundianum
- Afrocarpus falcatus
- Allophylus decipiens
- Apodytes dimidiata
- Berzelia intermedia
- Brachylaena glabra
- Brachylaena neriifolia
- Brunia nodiflora
- Buddleja saligna
- Buddleja salviifolia
- Burchellia bubalina
- Calodendrum capense
- Canthium kuntzeanum
- Canthium ventosum
- Capparis sepiaria var. citrifolia
- Carissa bispinosa
- Cassine aethopica
- Cassine crocea
- Cassine eucleaeformis
- Cassine papillosa
- Cassine parvifolia
- Cassine peragua
- Cassine tetragona
- Cassinopsis ilicifolia
- Celtis africana
- Chionanthus foveolatus subsp. foveolatus
- Chrysanthemoides monilifera
- Clausena anisata
- Clematis brachiata
- Clutia affinis
- Colpoon compressum
- Cunonia capensis
- Curtisia dentata
- Cussonia thyrsiflora
- Cyathea capensis (L.f.) J. E. Sm.
- Cynanchum ellipticum (Harv.) R. A. Dyer
- Diospyros dichrophylla
- Diospyros glabra
- Diospyros whyteana
- Dodonaea viscosa var. angustifolia
- Dovyalis rhamnoides
- Ekebergia capensis
- Elaeodendron schinoides Spreng.
- Empleurum unicapsulare (L. f.) Skeels
- Erica floribunda
- Euclea polyandra
- Euclea racemosa
- Euclea schimperi var. schimperi
- Euclea undulata
- Euryops virgineus (L.f.) DC.
- Excoecaria simii (Kuntze) Pax
- Faurea macnaughtonii
- Ficus burtt-davyi
- Ficus sur
- Gnidia denudata
- Gonioma kamassi
- Grewia occidentalis
- Gymnanthemum mespilifolium (Less.) H.Rob.
- Halleria lucida
- Heteromorpha arborescens
- Hippobromus pauciflorus
- Ilex mitis
- Kiggelaria africana
- Lachnostylis hirta
- Laurophyllus capensis
- Leucadendron adscendens
- Leucadendron conicum
- Leucadendron eucalyptifolium
- Leucospermum attenuatum
- Maerua cafra
- Maerua racemulosa
- Maytenus acuminata
- Maytenus heterophylla
- Maytenus nemorosa (Eckl. & Zeyh.) Marais
- Maytenus peduncularis
- Myrica humilis
- Myrica cordifolia
- Myrica serrata
- Neocussonia umbellifera
- Nuxia floribunda
- Ochna arborea
- Ocotea bullata
- Olea capensis subsp. capensis
- Olea capensis subsp. macrocarpa
- Olea europaea subsp. cuspidata
- Olea exasperata
- Olinia cymosa
- Passerina falcifolia
- Phylica paniculata Willd.
- Pittosporum viridiflorum
- Platylophus trifoliatus
- Podocarpus latifolius
- Polygala myrtifolia
- Protea mundii
- Protea neriifolia
- Prunus africana
- Pseudophyllanthus ovalis
- Psoralea pinnata
- Psychotria capensis
- Psydrax obovata
- Pterocelastrus rostratus
- Pterocelastrus tricuspidatus
- Pyrenacantha scandens Planch. ex Harv.
- Rapanea melanophloeos
- Rhamnus prinoides
- Rhoicissus tomentosa
- Rhus chirindensis
- Rhus crenata
- Rhus glauca
- Rhus longispina
- Rhus lucida
- Rhus tomentosa
- Rhus undulata
- Rothmannia capensis
- Salix mucronata subsp. capensis
- Scutia myrtina
- Secamone alpini
- Schotia afra var. afra
- Schotia latifolia
- Scolopia mundii
- Scolopia zeyheri
- Secamone alpini
- Sideroxylon inerme
- Sparrmannia africana
- Strelitzia alba
- Strychnos decussata
- Tarchonanthus camphoratus
- Trichocladus crinitus
- Trimeria grandifolia
- Vepris lanceolata
- Virgilia oroboides
- Zanthoxylum capense
- Zanthoxylum davyi

== See also ==
- Tsitsikamma National Park
- Garden Route
- Plettenberg Bay
- Keurboomstrand, Western Cape
