= Thesen =

Thesen is a surname. Notable people with the surname include:

- Charles Wilhelm Thesen (1856–1940), Norwegian-born South African businessman
- Johan Thesen (1867–1945), Norwegian businessman
- Nils Peter Thesen (1853–1929), Norwegian-born South African businessman
- Rolv Thesen (1896–1966), Norwegian poet, literary researcher and literary critic
- Sharon Thesen (born 1946), Canadian poet
