= Christopher Harison =

British military officer and forestry official in South Africa

Christopher Harison (c. 1825 - 8 November 1897) was a British military officer and forestry official in South Africa. He served as Conservator of Forests and was an authority on forest practice in the region.

Harison was born at Sutton Place, Seaford, East Sussex. He first arrived in the Cape of Good Hope in 1849 as a captain in the Perthshire Regiment (later the 2nd Battalion of the Black Watch, Royal Highland Regiment) to take part in the Eighth Frontier War (1850–1853). He resigned his commission on returning to England, married Louise Marie Millett Moorman, the daughter of a naval officer, and returned to Cape Agulhas to breed horses. The stud farm was not a success, and Harison joined the Government Forest Service. In 1856 was appointed Conservator over a large section of the Southern Cape forests, namely the Tsitsikamma forests eastward to Alexandria. His headquarters were located at Witelsbos near Storms River. In 1874 he became Conservator of a newly created conservancy including the forests of George, Knysna and Humansdorp. In 1888, he transferred to Tokai in Cape Town as Conservator over the Western Conservancy.

Thomas Bain and Christopher Harison first explored the feasibility of the Grootrivier Pass near Nature's Valley in 1868. Harison's interest in the building of the road stemmed from his belief that it could be used to halt the runaway destruction of the forest started by Dutch East India Company woodcutters in 1777 and carried on by their descendants. During his career as Conservator he was tireless in his efforts to preserve the forests and wildlife for posterity. A giant yellowwood in the Tsitsikamma Forest is named in his honour. He retired to Knysna in 1895, and died two years later.

His son, Launcelot Malcolm Harison, attended St Andrew's College in Grahamstown from 1869 to 1874. He was finally attached to Lord Methuen's staff and became president of the Military Court. His daughter, Eliza 'Bessie' Georgiana Harison, married Charles Wilhelm Thesen (1856–1940) of Knysna and produced ten children. She died in 1901 of complications during pregnancy at the age of thirty-eight.
