= Groot River =

Groot River or Grootrivier, meaning "large river", may refer to:

- Groot River (Eastern Cape), a tributary of the Gamtoos River (South Africa)
- Groot River (Southern Cape), a tributary of the Gourits River (South Africa)
- Groot River (Western Cape), a tributary of the Riet River, part of the Olifants/Doring River System (South Africa)
- Groot River (Tsitsikamma), a river in the Tsitsikamma Region forming a sizeable lagoon at Nature's Valley (South Africa)
  - Grootrivier Pass, a mountain pass above the Groot River (Tsitsikamma) Valley (South Africa)
- Another name for the Orange River (South Africa)
