= Scolopia steenisiana =

Conservation status
- Vulnerable (IUCN 2.3)

Scientific classification
- Kingdom: Plantae
- Clade: Tracheophytes
- Clade: Angiosperms
- Clade: Eudicots
- Clade: Rosids
- Order: Malpighiales
- Family: Salicaceae
- Genus: Scolopia
- Species: S. steenisiana

Binomial name
- Scolopia steenisiana Sleumer

Species of tree

Scolopia steenisiana is a species of plant in the family Salicaceae. It is a tree endemic to Peninsular Malaysia. It is threatened by habitat loss.
