= Médéric de Vasselot de Régné =

French forest officer

- Médéric de Vasselot de Régné
- Born: 4 August 1837; France
- Died: 23 April 1919 (aged 81)
- Education: National School of Forestry
- Occupation: Forester
- Spouse: Louise de Plas (m. 1863)
- Children: 15

Médéric de Vasselot de Régné (4 August 1837 – 23 April 1919) was a French-born forest officer trained at the National School of Forestry in Nancy, France. He was the Superintendent of Woods and Forests in South Africa from 1880 to 1891. Médéric and his older brother Marin Gabriel were sons of Jean Gabriel Charles Auguste de Vasselot de Régné (1780–1842) and Eugénie Gabrielle Elisabeth Selima Vasselot de la Chesnaye (1807–1879).

== Career ==
Médéric was appointed as Superintendent of Woods and Forests in 1880. When he left Cape Colony in 1891, the forests of George, Knysna, and the Tsitsikamma National Park were being managed scientifically. Médéric made two publications in 1885. "Introduction of Systematic Treatment to the Crown Forests of the Cape Colony" was first released, and a pamphlet entitled "Selection and Seasoning of Wood" was released later in the year. Both were translated into English by the then Conservator of Transkeian Forests, A. W. Heywood.

Médéric is commemorated in the de Vasselot Nature Reserve surrounding Nature's Valley.

== Marriage and family ==
Médéric belonged to the Vasselot family, an old French noble family with origins dating back to the 14th century. He was married on 5 October 1863, to Louise Suzanne Robinet de Plas (1844–1922), the daughter of Louis Augustin Ludovic Robinet de Plas (1813–1899) and Louise Marie Claire Picher (1824–1893).

Children:

- (daughter) Mary de Vasselot de Régné (1865–1940) married to Raymond Frotier de la Coste-Messelière
- (son) Maurice de Vasselot de Régné (1866–1868)
- (daughter) Francoise Marie Paule (1867–1900), a Catholic sister at the Sacré Coeur
- (daughter) Jeanne Marie de Vasselot de Régné (1869–1956) married to Pierre de Goy, voir Légion d'Honneur (Officier, 1860–1928)
- (son) Médéric de Vasselot de Régné (1871–1872)
- (daughter) Bernadette de Vasselot de Régné (1872–1872)
- (daughter) Marie-Elisabeth (1874–1940), a Catholic sister
- (son) Médéric de Vasselot de Régné, voir Légion d'Honneur (Officier, 1875–1954) married in December 1906 to Marie Joséphine Germaine de Baudus (1885–1920)
- (son) Bernard de Vasselot de Régné (1877–1891)
- (son) Hilaire de Vasselot de Régné (1878–1913), was a pilot with the French armed forces; he died in an airship accident
- (daughter) Marie Bernadette Radegonde de Vasselot de Régné (1879–1934) married in 1907 to Louis du Breuil Hélion de la Guéronnière (1876–1936)
- (daughter) Marie Thérèse Colomban Dolly de Vasselot de Régné (1882–1951) married in June 1915 to Marcel Roland-Gosselin (1864–1944)
- (daughter) Yvonne Marie de Vasselot de Régné (1884–1975)
- (son) Augustin Louis de Vasselot de Régné (1886–1911)
- (son) Jean Marie Maurice de Vasselot de Régné, Voir Mort pour la France (1888–1940) married to Jeanne-Marie Libault de la Chevasnerie
