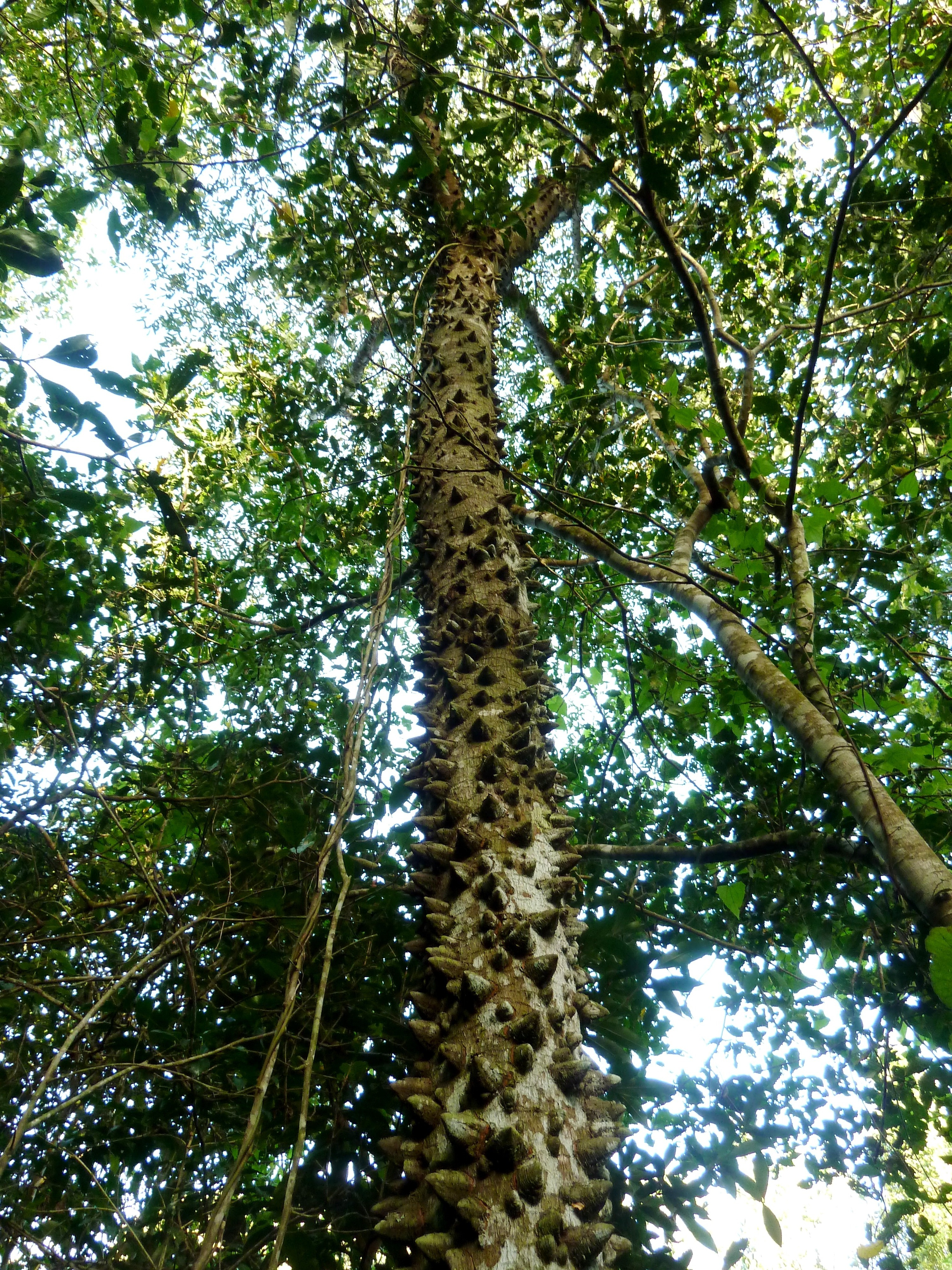

Scientific classification
- Kingdom: Plantae
- Clade: Tracheophytes
- Clade: Angiosperms
- Clade: Eudicots
- Clade: Rosids
- Order: Sapindales
- Family: Rutaceae
- Genus: Zanthoxylum
- Species: Z. davyi

Binomial name
- Zanthoxylum davyi (I.Verd.) Waterm.

Synonyms
- Fagara davyi I.Verd.; Zanthoxylum thunbergii DC.; Zanthoxylum thunbergii var. grandifolia Harv.

= Zanthoxylum davyi =

Forest knobwood

Species of flowering plant

Zanthoxylum davyi, the forest knobwood, is a dioecious species of plant in the family Rutaceae. It is native to the Western Cape, Eastern Cape, KwaZulu-Natal, Mpumalanga and Limpopo provinces of South Africa, western Eswatini and eastern Zimbabwe. It occurs in coastal and mistbelt forests, and grows some 10 to 24 m tall.

== Bole and bark ==
Their sturdy, straight trunks are heavily armed with hornlike knobs.

== Foliage and flowers ==
The compound leaves are 5 to 30 cm long.

== Species interactions and uses ==
Birds eat the fruit.

== Similar species ==
Similar species are the smaller Z. capense which occurs in mostly dryer inland regions, and Z. leprieurii which is native to sand forests of subtropical lowlands.
