= Salt River (Nature's Valley) =

River in the Western Cape, South Africa

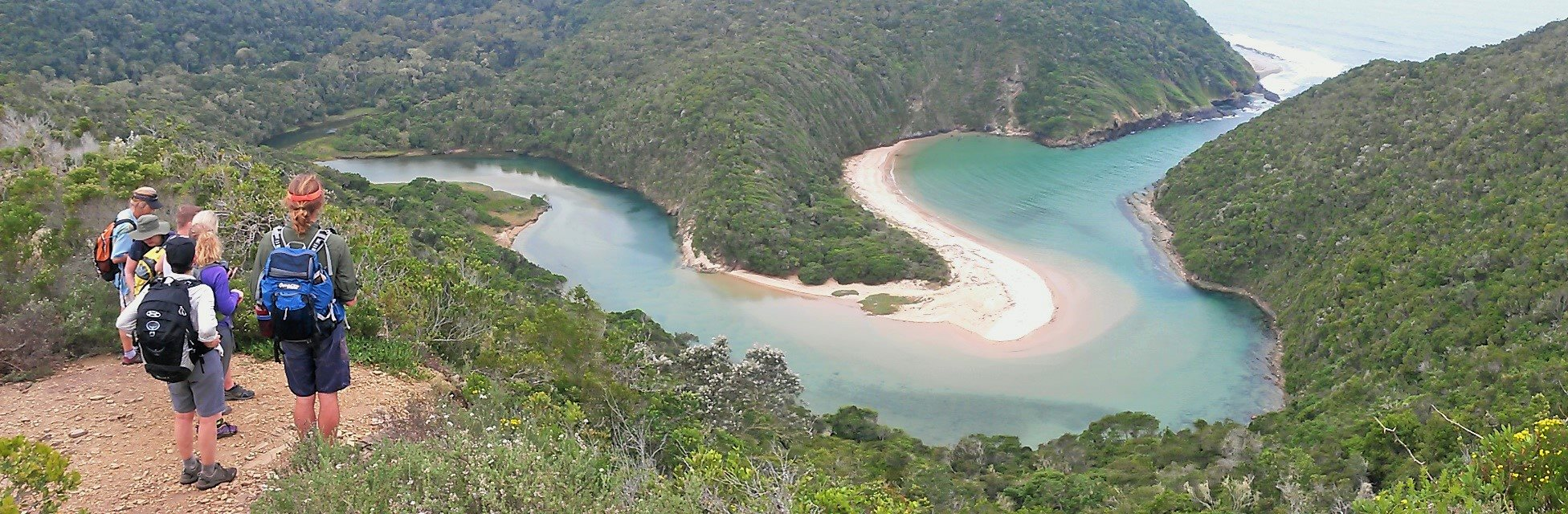
- Salt River lagoon and mouth

- Location in Western Cape

Location
- Country: South Africa
- Province: Western Cape

Physical characteristics
- Source
  - location: Tsitsikamma Mountains
- Mouth: Indian Ocean
  - location: West of Nature's Valley
  - coordinates: 33°59′22″S 23°32′11″E

The Salt River a.k.a. Soutrivier of the Garden Route arises in the Tsitsikamma Mountains between Knysna and Port Elizabeth in South Africa, and mouths into the Indian Ocean just west of Nature's Valley.

== Overview ==
Normally a gentle, small stream, the river's hydrology is such that flash floods may sweep down its stony course after heavy rains. Rivers along this coastline are subject to such flooding, mostly having short, steep courses, but relatively large catchment areas, funneling water into narrow, steep, rocky gorges, accompanied by rapid rises in water levels. Adventuring kloofers are at risk of being swept away at such times, the last such incident having taken place in 2015.

In the year 2000 the Albany Museum based in Grahamstown initiated surveys to determine which aquatic macroinvertebrates lived in the Salt River. This study followed on a proposal to introduce trout into the river, which has no freshwater fish of its own. Some 13 undescribed species of macroinvertebrate fauna collected by researchers proved to be of great interest, ending plans for introducing trout. This number later grew to 33 new species, several of which have been described by entomologists Ferdy de Moor and Helen James from the Albany Museum.

Eleven of the Tsitsikamma rivers were selected for closer study and were found to harbour a rich diversity of aquatic insects, many of which are regionally endemic species. "These fynbos covered sandstone mountains with their numerous gorges determine the nature of the rivers which are cold, fast-flowing, well oxygenated waters with little sediment. These rivers are acidic and of a red-brown colour, due to the presence of humic acid." Further studies have shown the most serious threat to the rivers' fauna to be excessive water abstraction, reduced flow leading to pH changes, eutrophication and unstable water temperatures. It was proposed that the Salt River be given special conservation status and that alien fish in dams within the catchment be removed.
