= Scolopia oreophila =

Conservation status
- Data Deficient (IUCN 2.3)

Scientific classification
- Kingdom: Plantae
- Clade: Tracheophytes
- Clade: Angiosperms
- Clade: Eudicots
- Clade: Rosids
- Order: Malpighiales
- Family: Salicaceae
- Genus: Scolopia
- Species: S. oreophila

Binomial name
- Scolopia oreophila (Sleumer) Killick

Species of flowering plant

Scolopia oreophila is a species of plant in the family Salicaceae. It is endemic to KwaZulu-Natal Province of South Africa.
