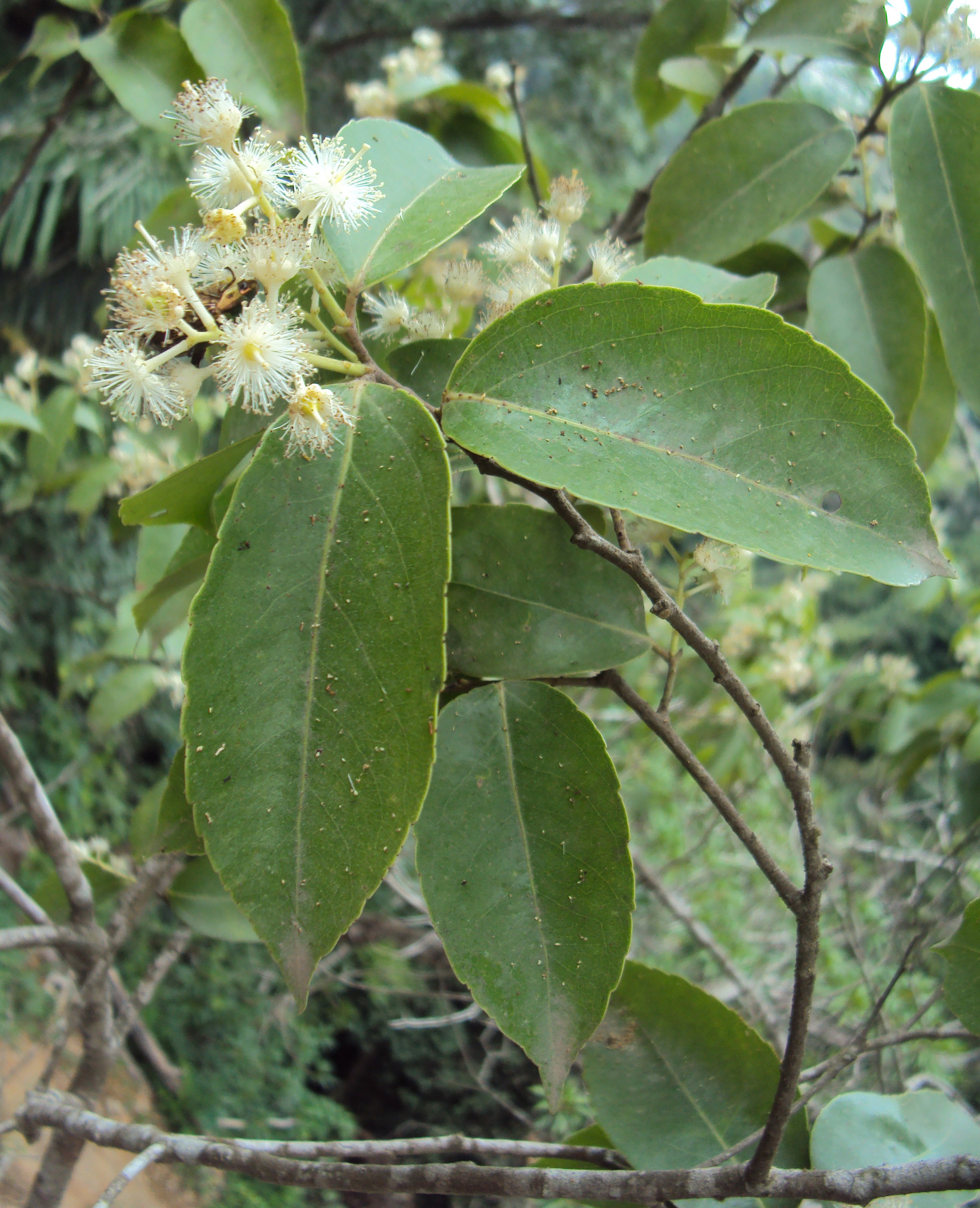
- Scolopia crenata

Scientific classification
- Kingdom: Plantae
- Clade: Tracheophytes
- Clade: Angiosperms
- Clade: Eudicots
- Clade: Rosids
- Order: Malpighiales
- Family: Salicaceae
- Subfamily: Salicoideae
- Tribe: Scolopieae
- Genus: Scolopia; Schreb.

Synonyms
- Aembilla Adans.; Phoberos Lour.; Richeopsis Arènes

= Scolopia =

Genus of plants

Scolopia is an Old World genus of plants in the family Salicaceae.

Species include:

- Scolopia braunii (Klotzsch) & Sleumer - an Australian rainforest tree
- Scolopia buxifolia Gagnep.
- Scolopia chinensis (Lour.) Clos
- Scolopia crassipes Clos.
- Scolopia crenata (Wight & Arn.) Clos
- Scolopia erythrocarpa H. Perrier
- Scolopia lucida Wall. ex Kurz
- Scolopia mundii (Eckl. & Zeyh.) Warb. - a South African Afromontane forest tree
- Scolopia oldhamii Hance
- Scolopia oreophila Killick
- Scolopia pusilla (Gaertn.) Willd.
- Scolopia rhinanthera
- Scolopia saeva (Hance) Hance
- Scolopia schreberi J.F.Gmel.
- Scolopia steenisiana Sleumer
- Scolopia zeyheri (Nees) Szyszyl.

The caterpillars of the rustic (Cupha erymanthis), a brush-footed butterfly, utilize species of this genus as food plants.
