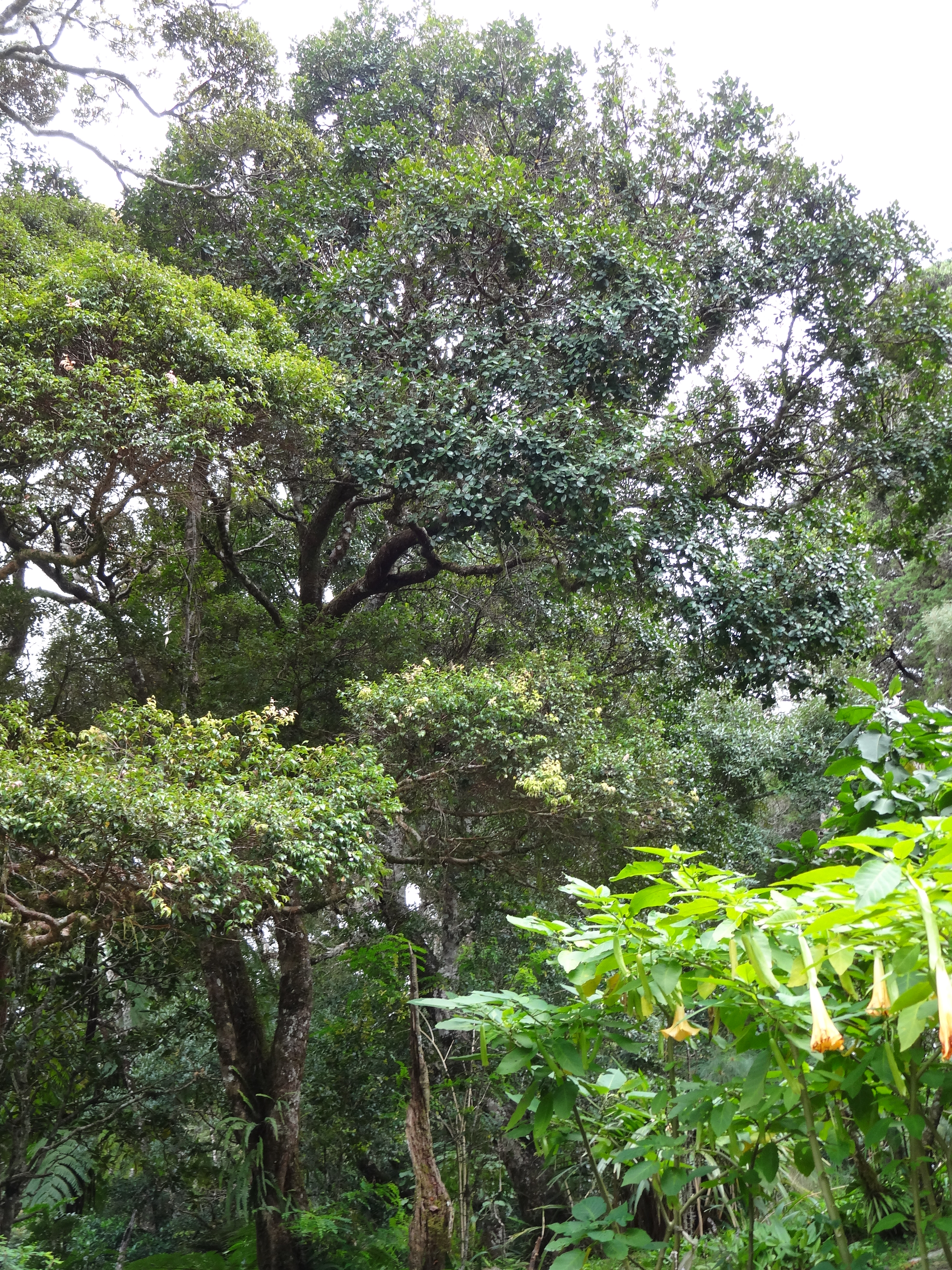
- Scolopia crassipes in Hakgale Botanical Garden

Scientific classification
- Kingdom: Plantae
- Clade: Tracheophytes
- Clade: Angiosperms
- Clade: Eudicots
- Clade: Rosids
- Order: Malpighiales
- Family: Salicaceae
- Genus: Scolopia
- Species: S. crassipes

Binomial name
- Scolopia crassipes Clos.

= Scolopia crassipes =

Species of flowering plant

Scolopia crassipes is a species of plant in the family Salicaceae. It is endemic to Sri Lanka.

== Culture ==
Known as ක‍ටු කෙන්ද (katu kenda) in Sinhala.

== External sources ==
Media related to Scolopia crassipes at Wikimedia Commons

- https://www.gbif.org/species/3879399/
- https://www.europeana.eu/portal/record/11608/NBGB_NBGB_BELGIUM_BR0000005056194.html
- http://arctos.database.museum/name/Scolopia%20crassipes
- http://www.ipni.org/ipni/advPlantNameSearch.do?find_genus=Scolopia&find_isAPNIRecord=on&find_isGCIRecord=on&find_isIKRecord=on&output_format=normal
