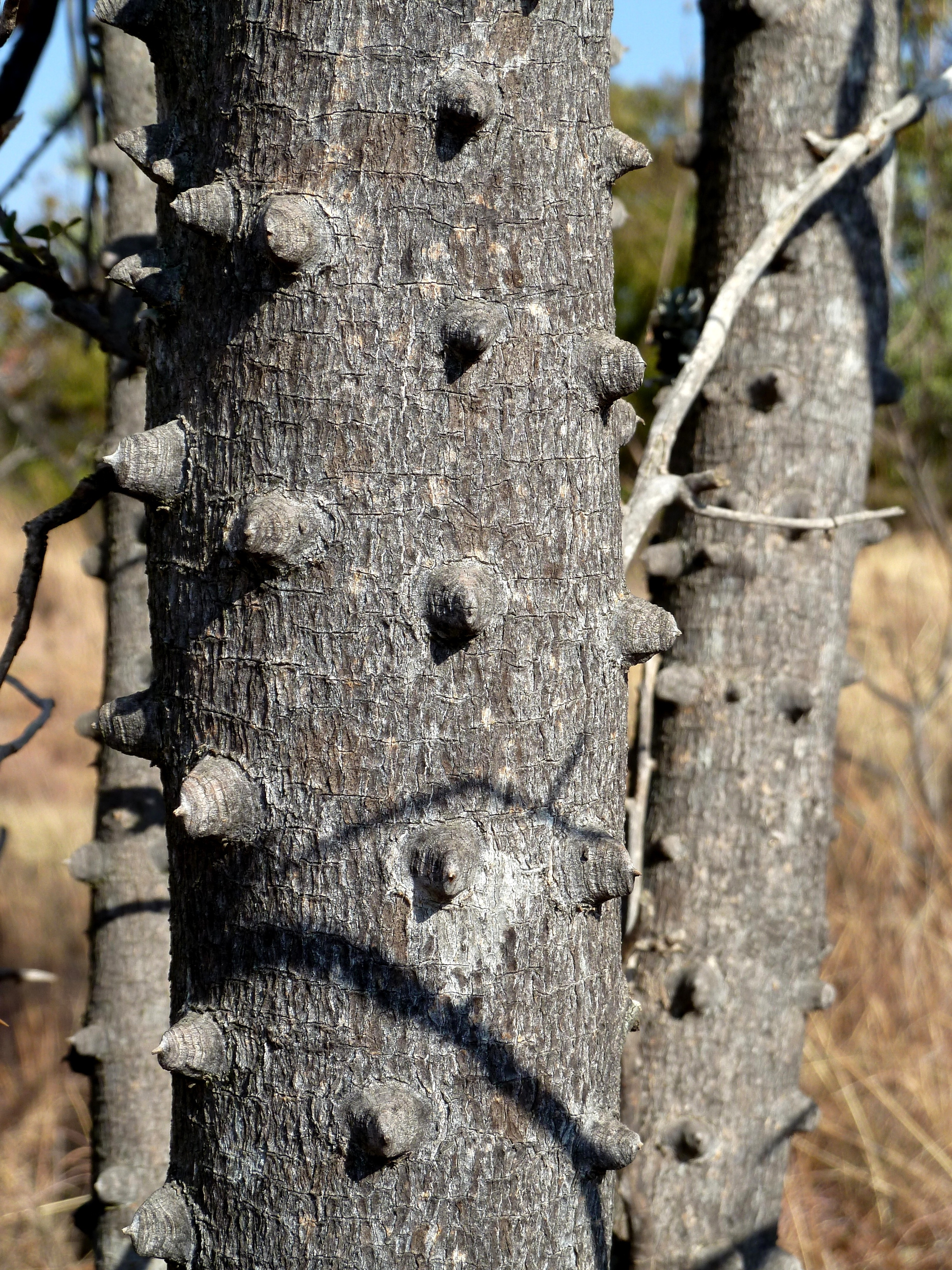

Scientific classification
- Kingdom: Plantae
- Clade: Embryophytes
- Clade: Tracheophytes
- Clade: Angiosperms
- Clade: Eudicots
- Clade: Rosids
- Order: Sapindales
- Family: Rutaceae
- Genus: Zanthoxylum
- Species: Z. capense

Binomial name
- Zanthoxylum capense (Thunb.) Harv.

Synonyms
- Fagara capensis; Fagara magaliesmontana Engl.; Zanthoxylum thunbergii var. obtusifolia Harv.

= Zanthoxylum capense =

Species of flowering plant

Zanthoxylum capense, the small knobwood, is a species of plant in the family Rutaceae. It occurs in the eastern regions of southern Africa, from the vicinity of Knysna, Western Cape to the Zimbabwean granite shield and coastal Mozambique. It tolerates a range of altitudes, from highveld to coastal elevations, but is most prevalent in dry thickets or on rocky slopes and outcrops.

Their trunks are bare apart from the numerous conical knobs that each terminate in a spine. They bear clusters of compound leaves on the tips of their branches. The leaves and fruit are noticeably citrus-scented. The fruit are round capsules of about 5 mm in diameter, fully covered with glands. When they ripen they split open to release a single black and oil-rich seed.

It is a host plant for the Citrus swallowtail, White-banded swallowtail and Emperor swallowtail butterflies. Similar species are the larger Z. davyi which is more limited to the mist belt regions, and Z. leprieurii that occurs in sand forests of subtropical lowlands.

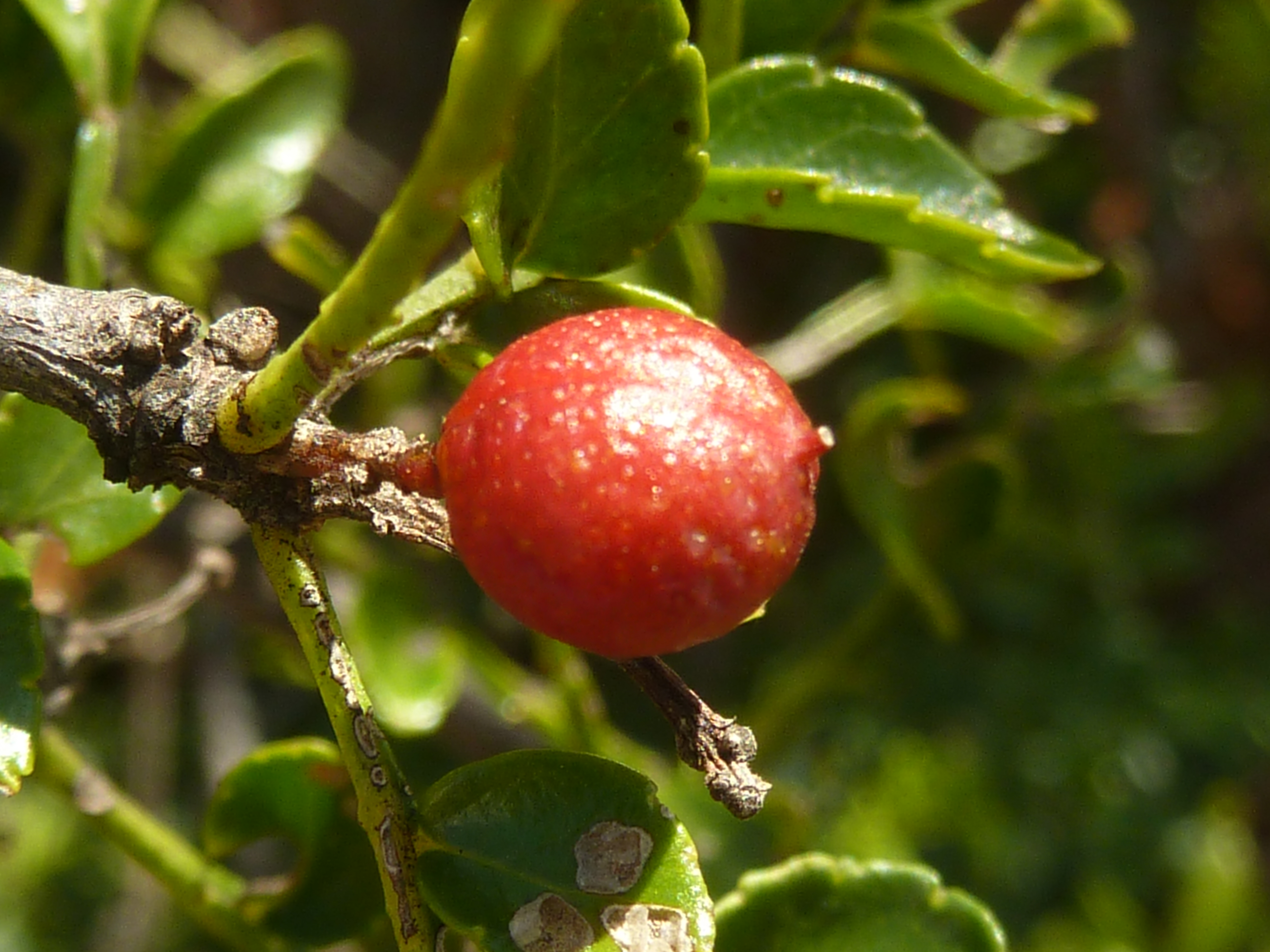
Ripe fruit

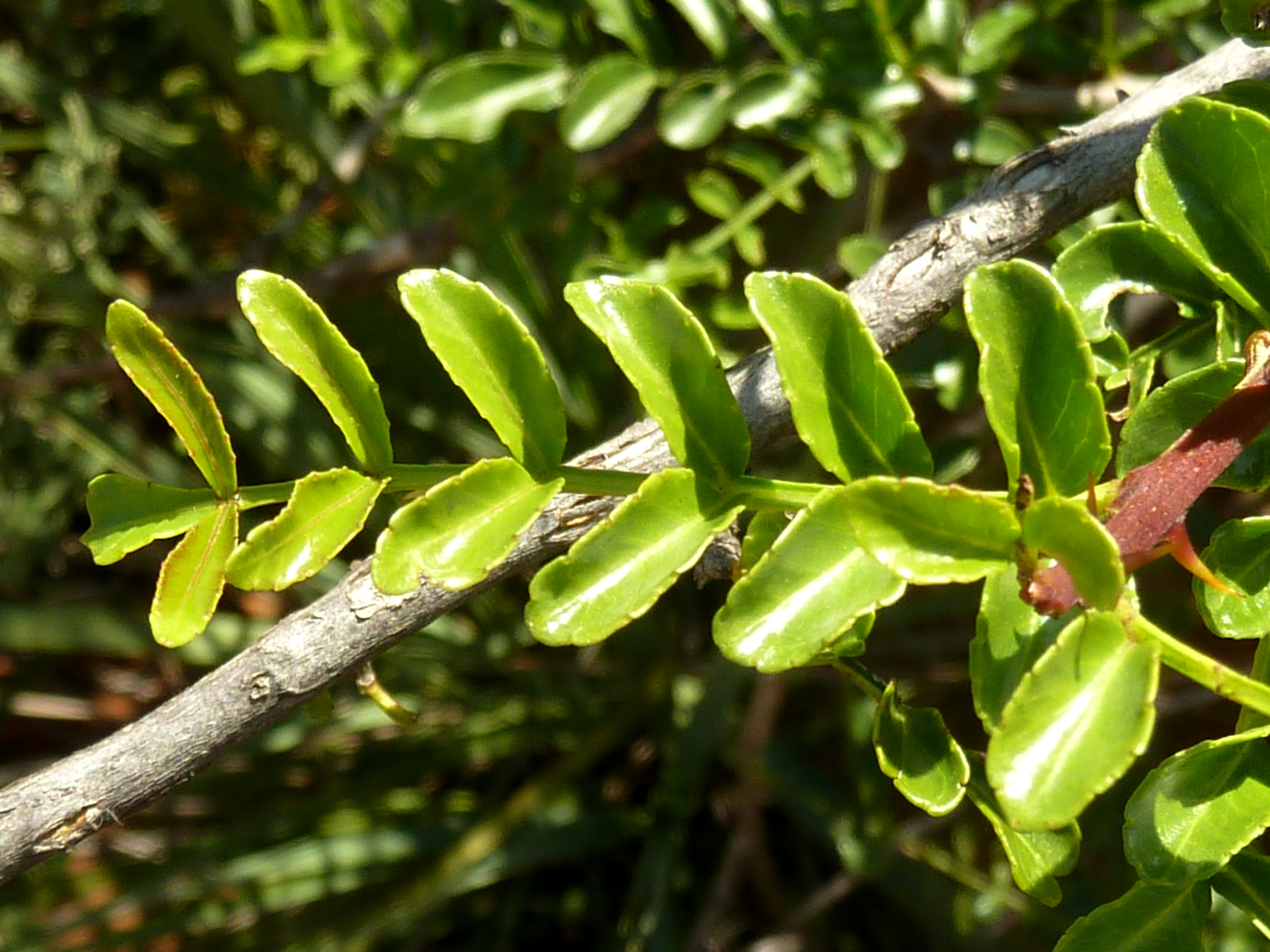
Compound leaf

== External references ==
- Zanthoxylum capense, Nature first
- Zanthoxylum capense, Flora of Zimbabwe
- Small Knobwood - Zanthoxylum capense, wildcard.co.za
- Zanthoxylum capense, PlantZAfrica.com
