= Scolopia schreberi =

Scientific classification
- Kingdom: Plantae
- Clade: Tracheophytes
- Clade: Angiosperms
- Clade: Eudicots
- Clade: Rosids
- Order: Malpighiales
- Family: Salicaceae
- Genus: Scolopia
- Species: S. schreberi

Binomial name
- Scolopia schreberi J.F.Gmel.

Species of flowering plant

Scolopia crassipes is a species of plant in the family Salicaceae. It is endemic to Sri Lanka.

== Description ==
Leaves very variable, oblong-ovate, cordate to rounded base, acute to obtuse apex, margins faintly scalloped.

=== Trunk ===
Bark - gray; branches slender, compound axillary spines.

=== Flowers ===
White; Inflorescence - simple racemes shorter than leaves.

=== Fruits ===
Bright red, fleshy, ovoid berry.

== Ecology ==
Monsoon, intermediate, and rain forest understory.

== Culture ==
Known as ක‍ටු කුරුදු (katu kurundu) in Sinhala.
