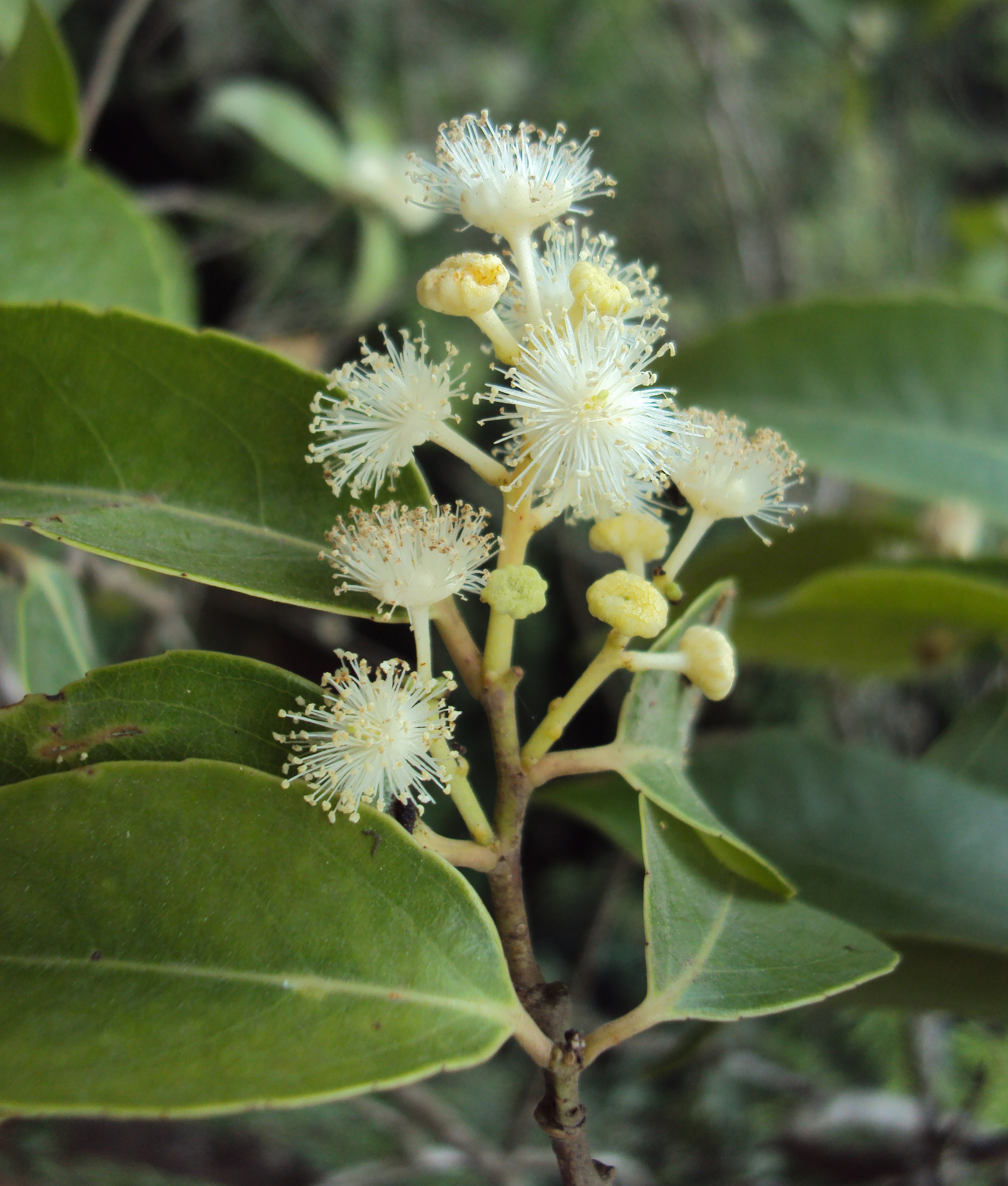
- Flowers

Scientific classification
- Kingdom: Plantae
- Clade: Tracheophytes
- Clade: Angiosperms
- Clade: Eudicots
- Clade: Rosids
- Order: Malpighiales
- Family: Salicaceae
- Genus: Scolopia
- Species: S. crenata

Binomial name
- Scolopia crenata (Wt. & Arn.) Clos

Synonyms
- Phoberos crenata Wt. & Arn.

= Scolopia crenata =

Species of tree

Scolopia crenata, known commonly as potato plum of Mysore, is a subcanopy tree found in tropical evergreen to semi-evergreen forests of Indo-Malaysia and the Western Ghats, up to 1800 m.
