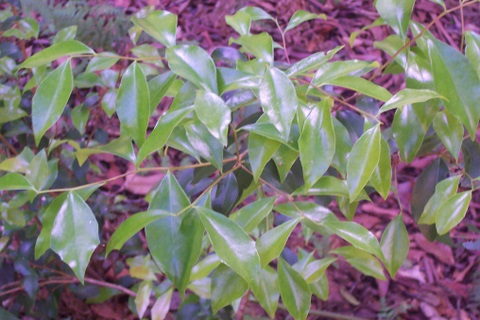
- Scolopia braunii growing at Tamban Forest, near Kempsey, Australia

Scientific classification
- Kingdom: Plantae
- Clade: Tracheophytes
- Clade: Angiosperms
- Clade: Eudicots
- Clade: Rosids
- Order: Malpighiales
- Family: Salicaceae
- Genus: Scolopia
- Species: S. braunii

Binomial name
- Scolopia braunii Klotzsch & Sleumer

Synonyms
- Scolopia brownii F.Muell.; Adenogyrus braunii Klotzsch

= Scolopia braunii =

Species of tree

Scolopia braunii is an Australian rainforest tree. Common names for this species include flintwood, mountain cherry, brown birch and scolopia. The habitat is Australian coastal rainforests of various types.

The natural range of distribution of Scolopia braunii is between Jervis Bay (35° S) in the south to Cape York Peninsula at the northernmost part of Australia.

== Description ==
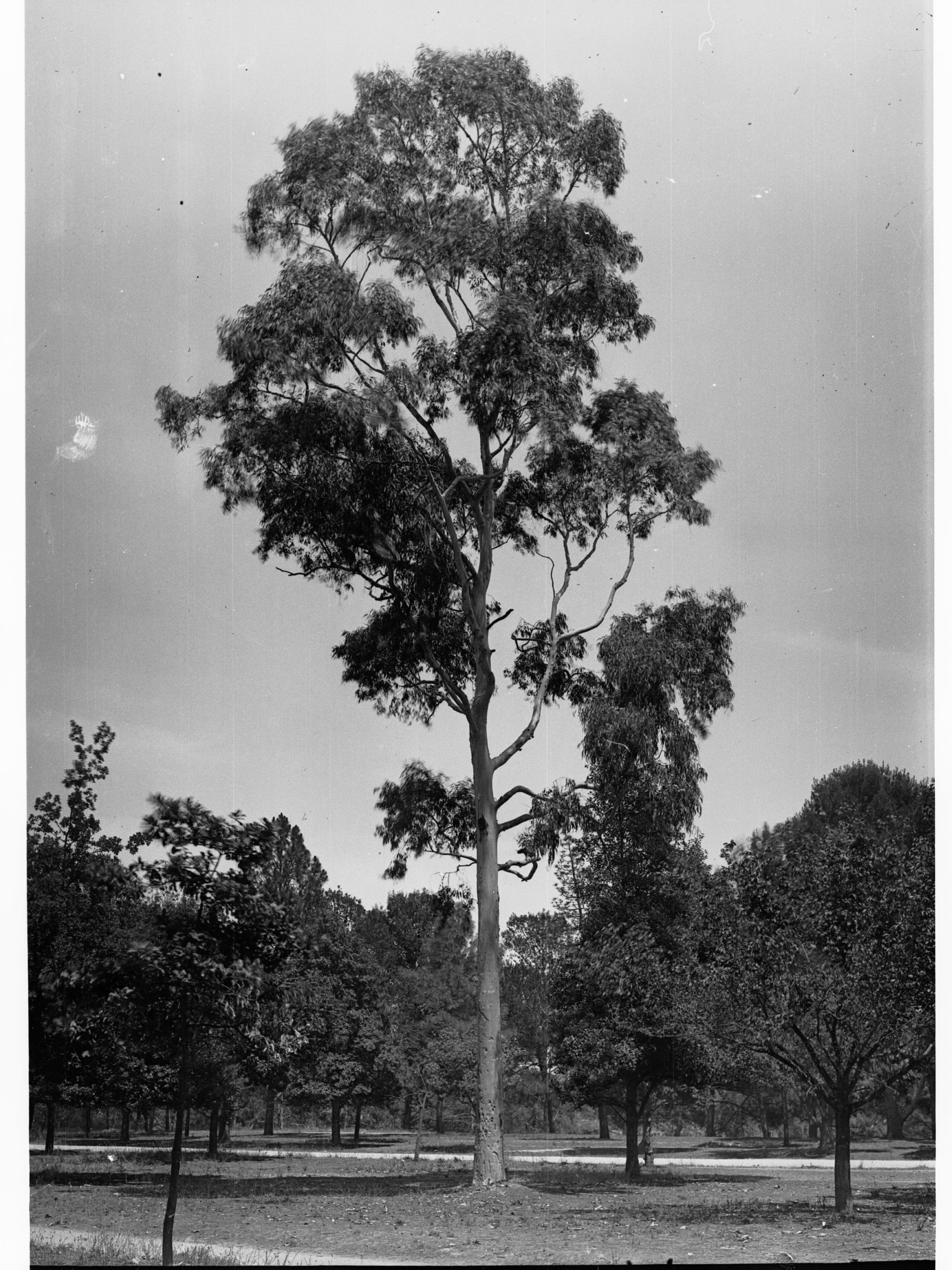
Scolopia brownii, Adelaide Botanic Garden, ca. 1925

It is a medium-sized tree growing to 25 metres tall and 50 cm in stem diameter. The trunk is flanged or somewhat buttressed on larger trees. The thin orange/brown bark has small raised irregularities and scaly depressions.

Young rhomboid-shaped red leaves form on slender branchlets, marked with pale lenticels. Leaves alternate, sometimes toothed, 4 to 9 cm long. Creamy white flowers form on panicles in September to November. The fruit is a red berry, turning black when mature, 1 cm in diameter containing two to four seeds. The fruit ripens from December to April. Germination from seed is erratic, sometimes coming up within three weeks. Other times germination is slow and difficult. However, cuttings prove more successful.

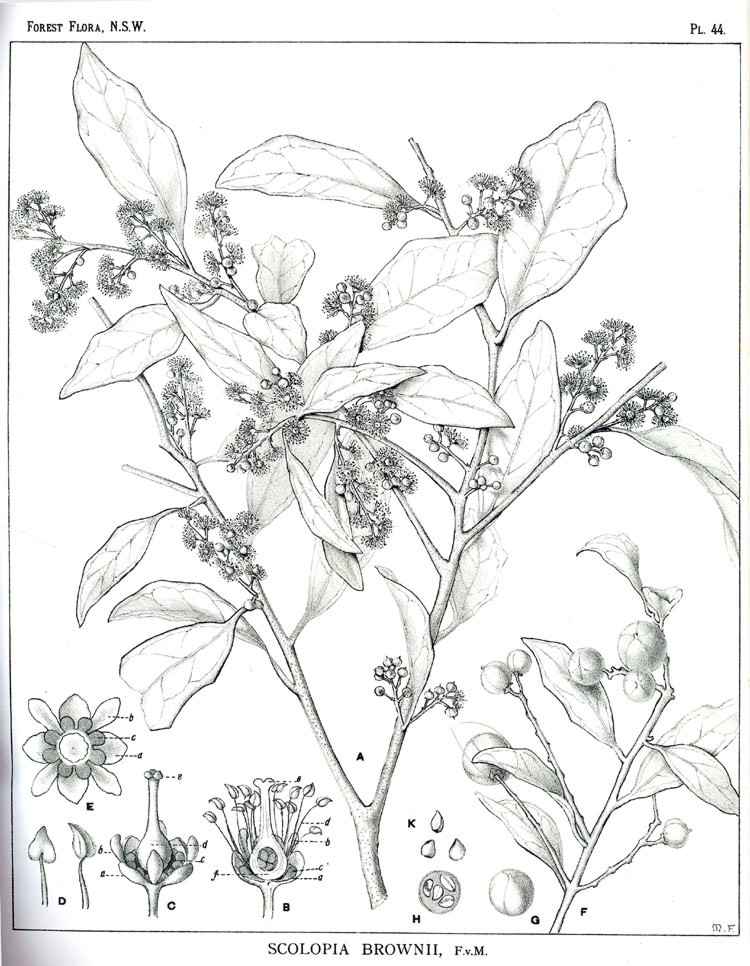
Drawing by Margaret Flockton
