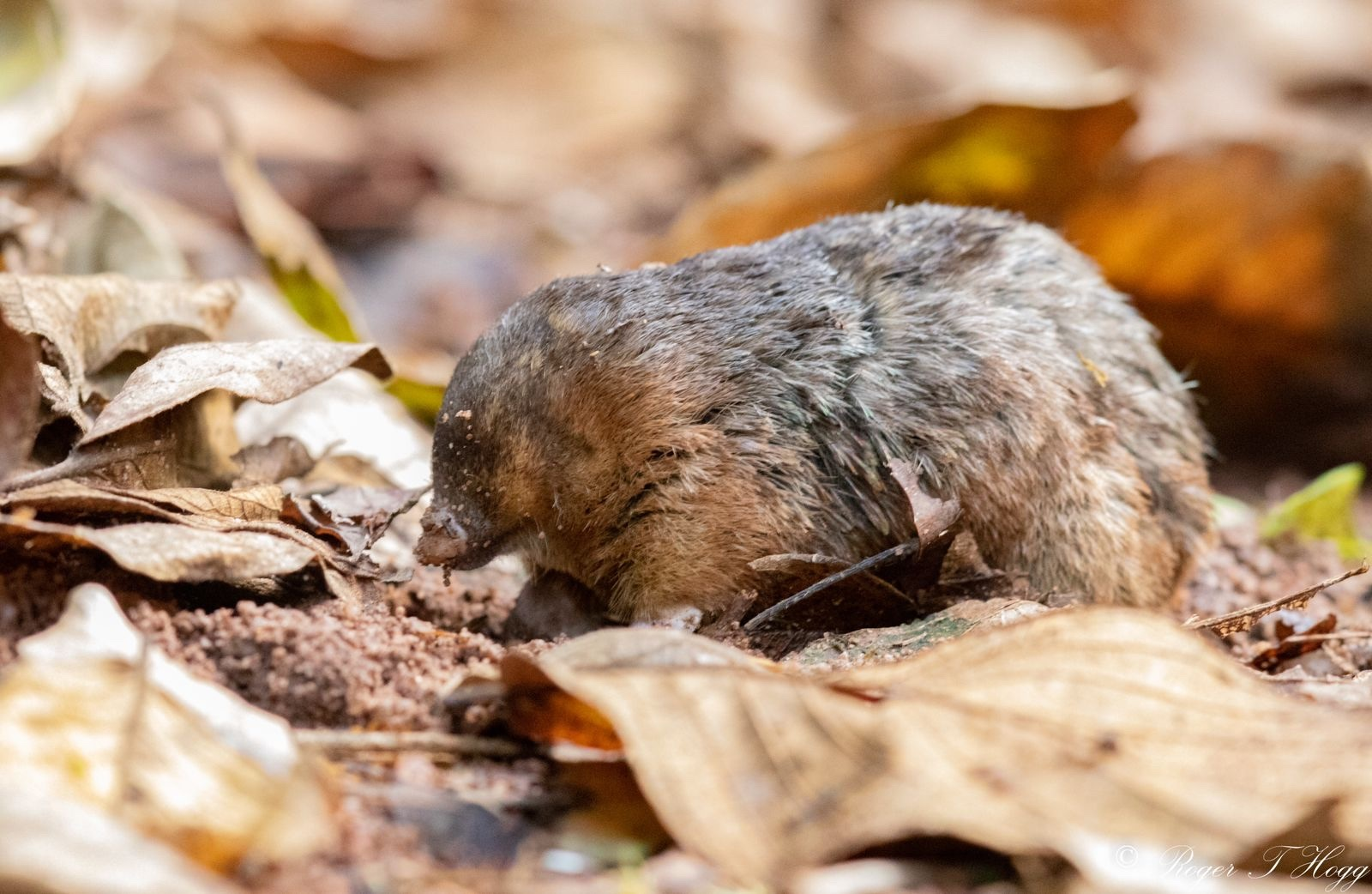

Conservation status
- Least Concern (IUCN 3.1)

Scientific classification
- Kingdom: Animalia
- Phylum: Chordata
- Class: Mammalia
- Order: Afrosoricida
- Family: Chrysochloridae
- Genus: Amblysomus
- Species: A. hottentotus

Binomial name
- Amblysomus hottentotus (A. Smith, 1829)

Subspecies
- Amblysomus hottentotus hottentotus Amblysomus hottentotus iris Amblysomus hottentotus longiceps Amblysomus hottentotus meesteri Amblysomus hottentotus pondoliae
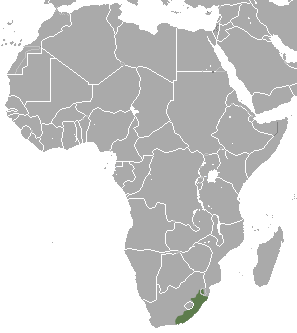
- Hottentot golden mole range

= Hottentot golden mole =

Species of mammal

The Hottentot golden mole (Amblysomus hottentotus) is a species of mammal in the golden mole family, Chrysochloridae. It is found in South Africa, Eswatini, and possibly Lesotho. Its natural habitats are temperate forests, subtropical or tropical dry and moist lowland forest and dry shrubland and grassland, Mediterranean-type shrubby vegetation, savanna, temperate grassland, sandy shores, arable land, pastureland, plantations, rural gardens, and urban areas.

It has several subspecies, including the Zulu golden mole (Amblysomus hottentotus iris).

In 2013 it was discovered that Hottentot golden moles prefer mates with larger penises.
