= Zulu golden mole =

Conservation status
- Least Concern (IUCN 2.3)

Scientific classification
- Kingdom: Animalia
- Phylum: Chordata
- Class: Mammalia
- Order: Afrosoricida
- Family: Chrysochloridae
- Genus: Amblysomus
- Species: A. hottentotus
- Subspecies: A. h. iris

Trinomial name
- Amblysomus hottentotus iris Thomas & Schwann, 1905

Synonyms
- Amblysomus iris

Subspecies of mole

The Zulu golden mole (Amblysomus hottentotus iris) is a subspecies of golden mole native to Transvaal, South Africa.
