= Johan Thesen =

Norwegian businessman

Johan Rasch Jentoft Thesen (18 September 1867 – 21 March 1945) was a Norwegian businessperson.

He was born in Bergen, and took commerce school. In 1894 he and his brother Georg took over the company founder in 1851 by his father, Johan Thesen & Co. The company was headquartered in Strandgaten, Bergen and exported fish products, mainly cod liver oil, to Europe and the United States.

Thesen was a prominent person in the business life of Bergen. He was a supervisory council member of Bergens Kreditbank from 1897 to 1922, Bergens Telefonkompani from 1903, Bergen Mekaniske Verksted from 1912 to 1920 (and deputy board member from 1920 to 1929), Det Bergenske Dampskibselskab from 1919 and Æolus from 1924. He was a board member of Selskabet for de norske Fiskeriers Fremme from 1903, and praeses since 1918. He was a board member of the Bergen chamber of commerce, the French chamber of commerce in Oslo and the Norwegian chamber of commerce in London. He was also a consul for the Kingdom of Italy in Norway from 1893 to 1919.

Thesen was also a board member of the Norwegian Fisheries Museum 1893 to 1917, the Alliance française from 1914, Bergens Kunstforening from 1916 to 1921, and Vestlandske Kunstindustrimuseum from 1916 to 1930.

He was decorated as an Officer of the Order of the Crown of Italy and a Knight of the Order of Saints Maurice and Lazarus. He died in March 1945 and was buried in Årstad.
