= Charles Wilhelm Thesen =

Norwegian-born South African shipowner and timber merchant

- Born: 14 November 1856; Stavanger, Norway
- Died: 1 February 1940 (aged 83); Knysna, Cape Province, South Africa
- Occupations: Shipowner, timber merchant

Charles Wilhelm Thesen (14 November 1856 – 1 February 1940) was a Norwegian-born South African shipowner and timber merchant who played a leading role in the public affairs of the South African town of Knysna. He was actively involved in the timber and shipbuilding industry of the region, and acquired Paarden Island in the Knysna Lagoon, on which he built a sawmill and shipyard. The island was later renamed Thesen Island, after him and his family.

== Biography ==
Charles was born in Stavanger, the fifth son of Arndt Leonard Thesen (26 October 1816 – 24 June 1875), a wealthy and respected man in the town. The German-Danish War of 1864–67 caused a downturn in trade and shipping, and in 1868 caused the collapse of several companies in Stavanger, among which was A.L. Thesen & Co.

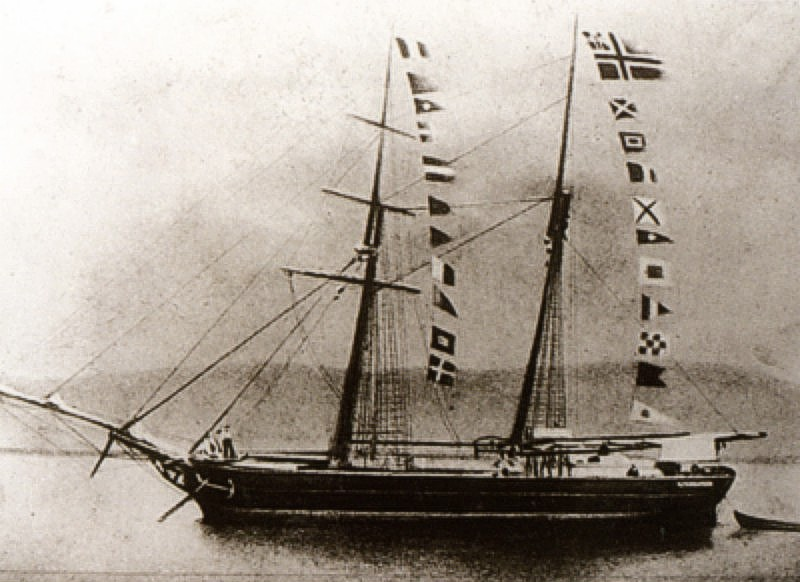
Albatros

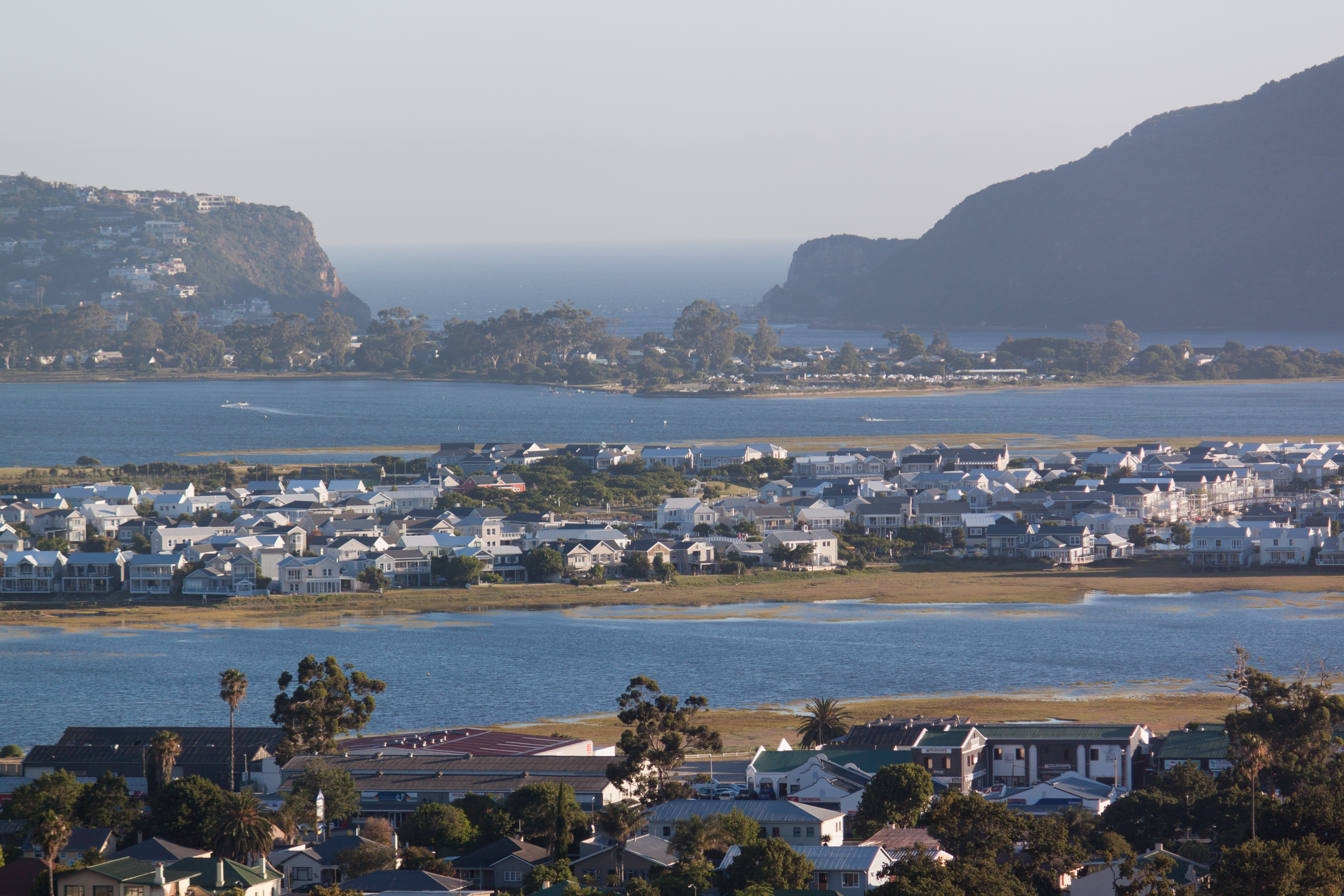
Thesen Island today, in the centre of the Knysna Lagoon

Arndt, together with his wife, Anne Cathrine Margreta Brandt, seven sons, two daughters, his brother Mathias Theodore Thesen (26 October 1813 – 18 June 1884), and his son, Hans Adolf (17 October 1843 – 5 March 1909), and a crew of seven, left Norway for New Zealand on 14 August 1869 in his 117-ton schooner, Albatros. The ship was loaded with timber to be sold on their arrival. They reached Cape Town on 16 November 1869 and after a week's stay for repairs and provisioning, the voyage to New Zealand was resumed. Storms at Cape Agulhas forced them to put about and return to Table Bay. In Cape Town, the Swedish-Norwegian consul, Carl Gustaf Åkerberg, told the Thesens about the shortage of cargo ships plying the South African coast. The plan to sail to New Zealand was at first postponed and later set aside.

After several coastal cargo voyages, the Thesen family settled in Knysna. They started with shipping timber, a business they knew well from Norway, but soon ventured into saw-milling and acquiring forested land. From February 1872 Charles worked as a clerk for William Anderson & Co in Port Elizabeth, but on his father's death in 1875, he joined and managed the family firm, adding new vessels to their fleet, buying more land and trying oyster farming. They also diversified into hardware stores, supermarkets, whaling, gold prospecting and mining, railway construction and road transport. Thesen did not forget his Norwegian roots and commissioned his freight ships such as "Outeniqua" in 1915 from "Porsgrund Mekaniske Værksted" in Porsgrund. He married Eliza Bessie Georgiana Harison (5 March 1863 – 6 August 1901), daughter of the first conservator of forests, Christopher Harison, an opportune joining of the two families. They produced ten children, 5 sons and 3 daughters surviving. After Bessie's death of pregnancy complications in 1901, he married Lucia Johanna Christine Thesen (1875–1963), the daughter of his cousin Hans Adolf, and she bore one son and two daughters.

Charles was active in local politics, serving on the divisional and municipal councils, filling the offices of mayor, chairman of the Chamber of Commerce and a member of the Cape Provincial Council. In 1904 he bought Paarden Island, part of the Melkhoutkraal Estate of George Rex. Here the Thesens processed cut timber from 1922 and the island later became known as Thesen Island. Charles died in Knysna, aged 83.

One of Charles' sisters, Blanka Thesen, married Francis William Reitz, president of the Orange Free State. Charles's other brothers were Hjalmar (14 February 1846 – 1923), Rolf (9 August 1850 – 18 October 1883), Ragnvald (9 August 1850 – 8 July 1936) and Nils (24 April 1853 – 23 November 1929).

== Vessels owned by the Thesen family ==
The vessel Albatros traded along the Southern African coast, sailing to Mauritius on one occasion, taking two months and ten days for the round trip. In March 1874, en route from Knysna to Cape Town and under captain Knud Thomasen, she struck a reef off Cape Agulhas and went down. The passengers and crew were stranded for three days on Dyer Island before being rescued by local fishermen and then travelling by wagon to Caledon. The Thesens' next vessel was the 191-ton brig Ambulant which, in 1883, was the first ship to take on cargo at the new Government Wharf off Thesen's Island, the cargo consisting of 3 000 railway sleepers to Cape Town. Competition from the Castle and Union Lines forced Thesen's to shut down this route and Ambulant was sold off in 1884. This was followed in 1895 by the 427-ton mail packet Agnar, a steamship nicknamed 'Agony' by the local school children she regularly carried to boarding schools in Cape Town. She stayed in service for some 40 years, as troop carrier for the British colonial government in the Boer War (1899–1902) and for the German government in the Herero Wars in German South-West Africa (1904–1907). She was taken over by a business in Madagascar in 1934 and was lost in a cyclone off Mauritius in 1938. The 706-ton Ingerid was taken into service in 1901 and the 600-ton Karatara in 1913. The 1019-ton Outeniqua joined the fleet in 1915, the 139-ton Clara converted from a sand barge and suction dredger and the 216-ton Nautilus in 1917.

Thesen's Steamship Co.

The Outeniqua was the company's flagship, could accommodate fifty passengers and remained in service until 1945. In 1916 the Thesen Line became the Thesen's Steamship Company, but the coastal shipping trade was languishing. Vessels which had been conscripted during World War I were free to ply commercial routes after the War, leading to keen competition. Improvements in the road and rail infrastructure, particularly the opening of the George-Knysna railway line in 1928, led to cheaper tariffs for travel by land. The Thesen family sold off four of its eight vessels, and in 1921 the entire company with the remaining Agnar, Ingerid, Outeniqua and Clara. The buyer was the English-based Houston Line, which continued to use Thesen's red swallowtail with white star.
