= Nils Peter Thesen =

Nils Peter Thesen (24 April 1853 – 23 November 1929) was a Norwegian-born, South African businessperson.

He was a son of Arndt Leonard Thesen (1816–1875) and Ane Catherine Margrethe Brandt (1819–1900). The family emigrated from Stavanger, Norway to Knysna, Cape Colony in 1869, and founded the company Thesen and Company.

Nils Peter Thesen became a co-owner of this company, and also served as consul-general for Norway in South Africa. He was decorated as a Knight, First Class of the Order of St. Olav.

He died in November 1929. Thesen had several brothers, of which Charles Wilhelm Thesen was the most prominent. Through a sister, he was a brother-in-law of Francis William Reitz.
