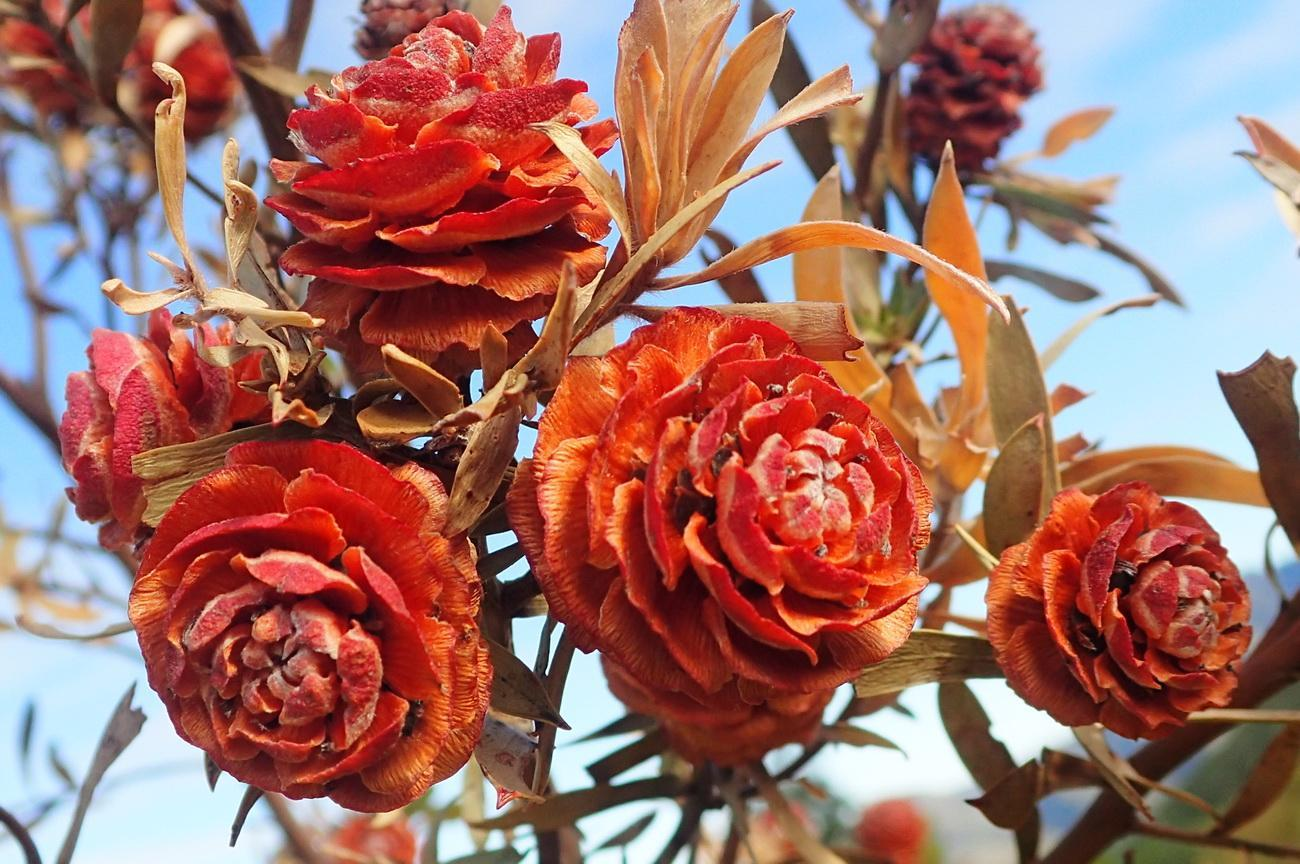

Conservation status
- Near Threatened (IUCN 3.1)

Scientific classification
- Kingdom: Plantae
- Clade: Tracheophytes
- Clade: Angiosperms
- Clade: Eudicots
- Order: Proteales
- Family: Proteaceae
- Genus: Leucadendron
- Species: L. conicum

Binomial name
- Leucadendron conicum (Lam.) I.Williams

Synonyms
- Leucadendron ramosissimum H.Buek ex Meisn.; Protea conica Lam.; Protea ramosissima Kuntze

= Leucadendron conicum =

Species of plant

Leucadendron conicum, the garden route conebush, is a flower-bearing shrub that belongs to the genus Leucadendron and is part of the fynbos form. The plant is native to the Western Cape and the Eastern Cape, where it occurs in the Langeberg, Outeniqua Mountains, Tsitsikamma Mountains, Elandsberg and Garden Route plain.The shrub grows to be 6 m and bears flowers from October to November.

In Afrikaans it is known as vaaltolbos. The tree is number 78.1 on the National List of Indigenous Trees in South Africa.

== Gallery ==
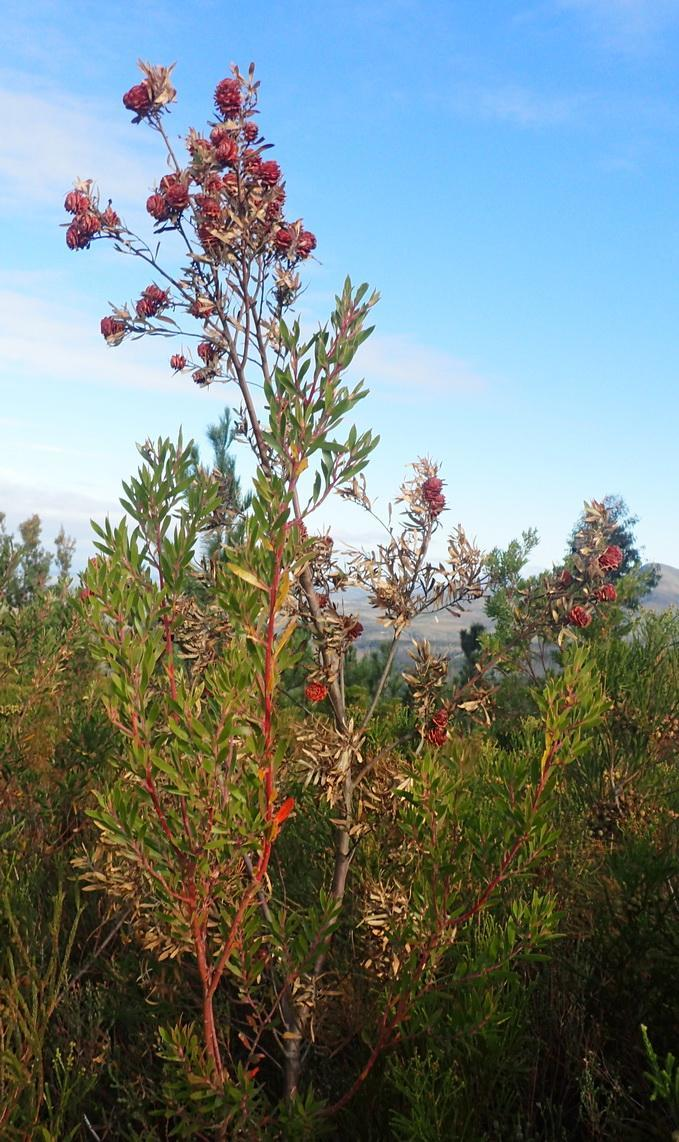

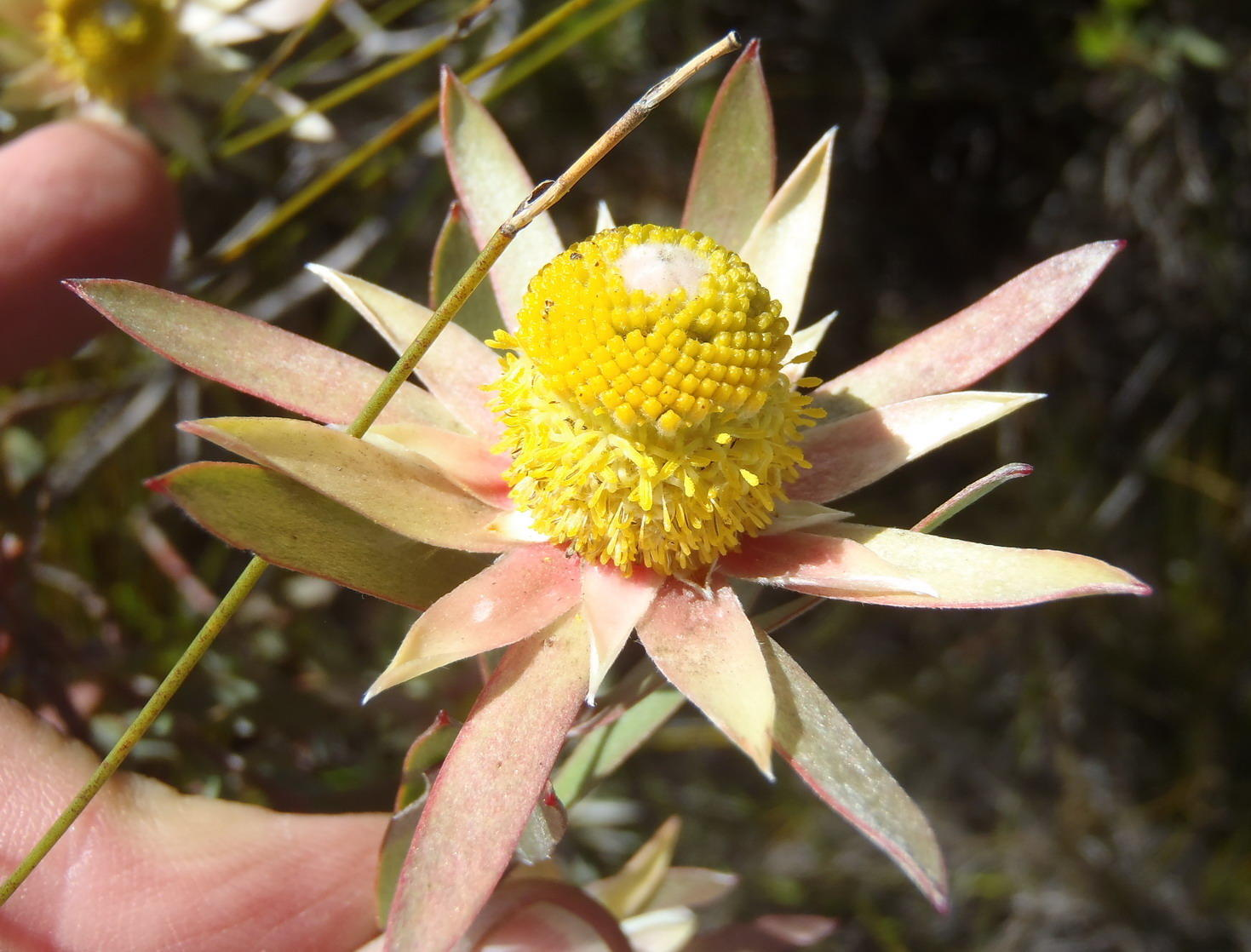

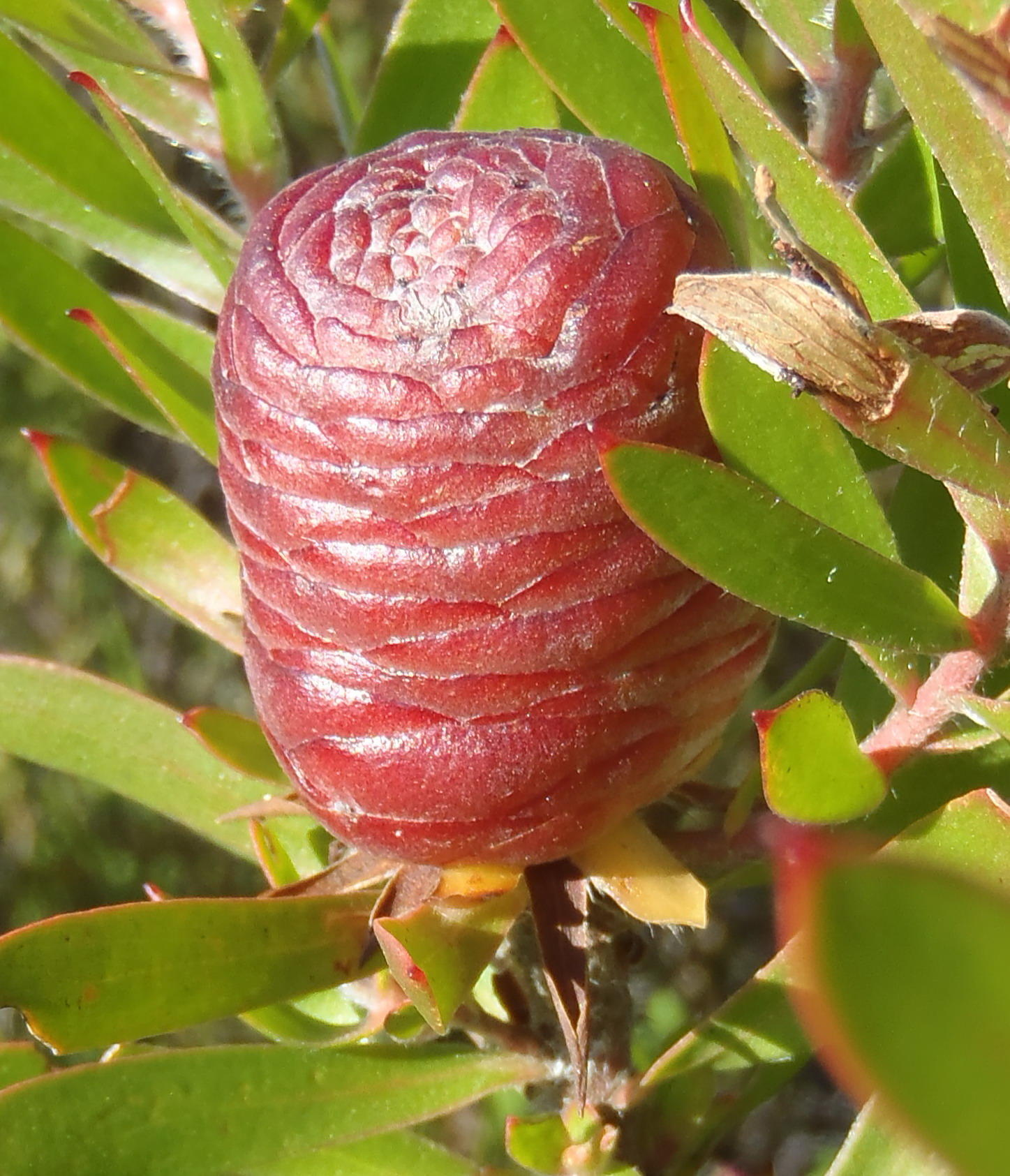

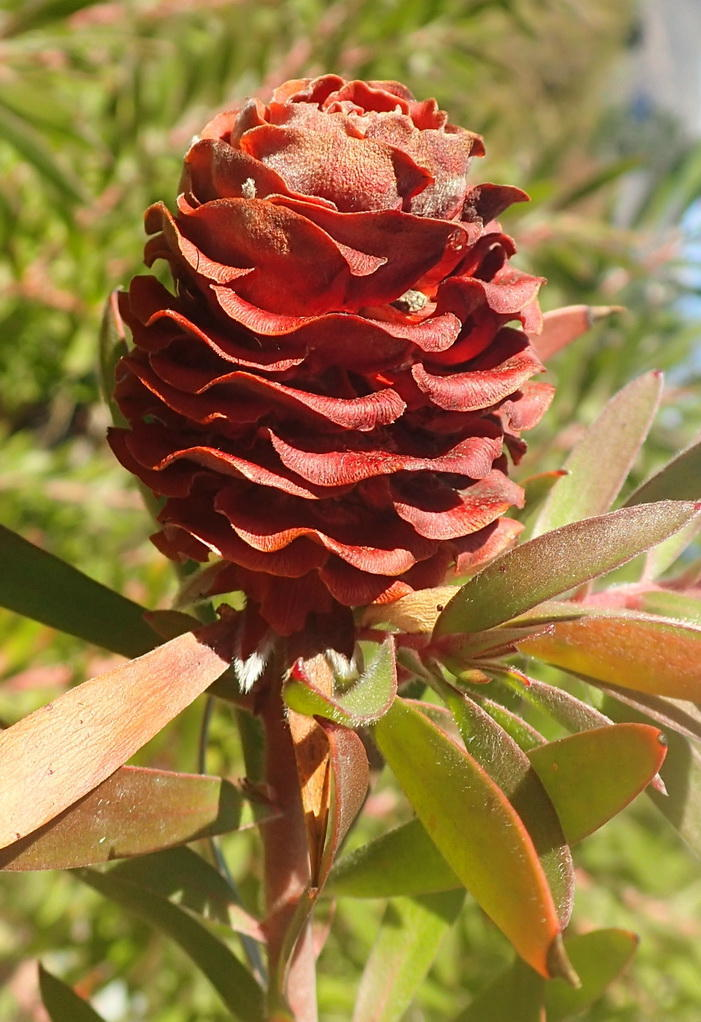

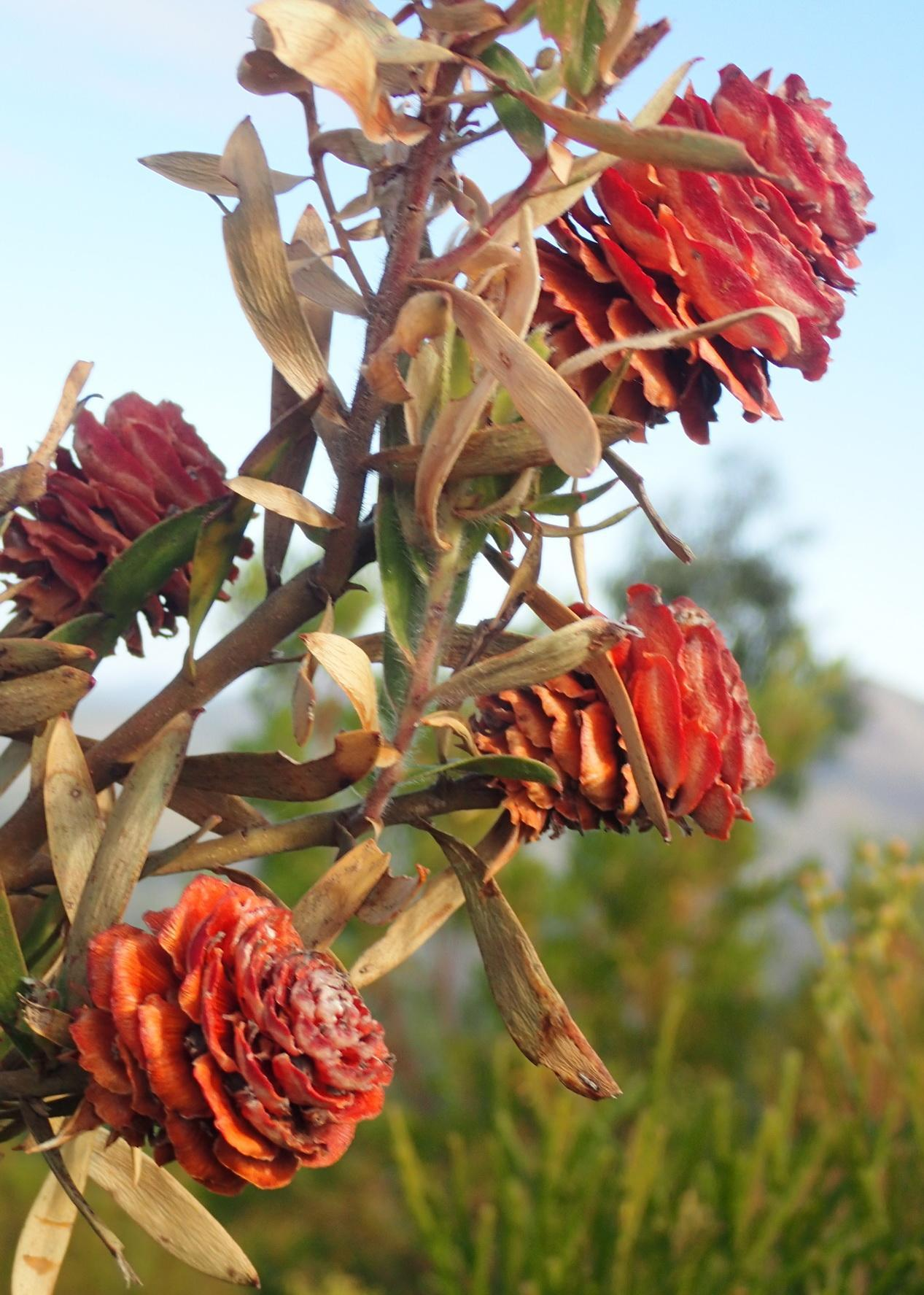

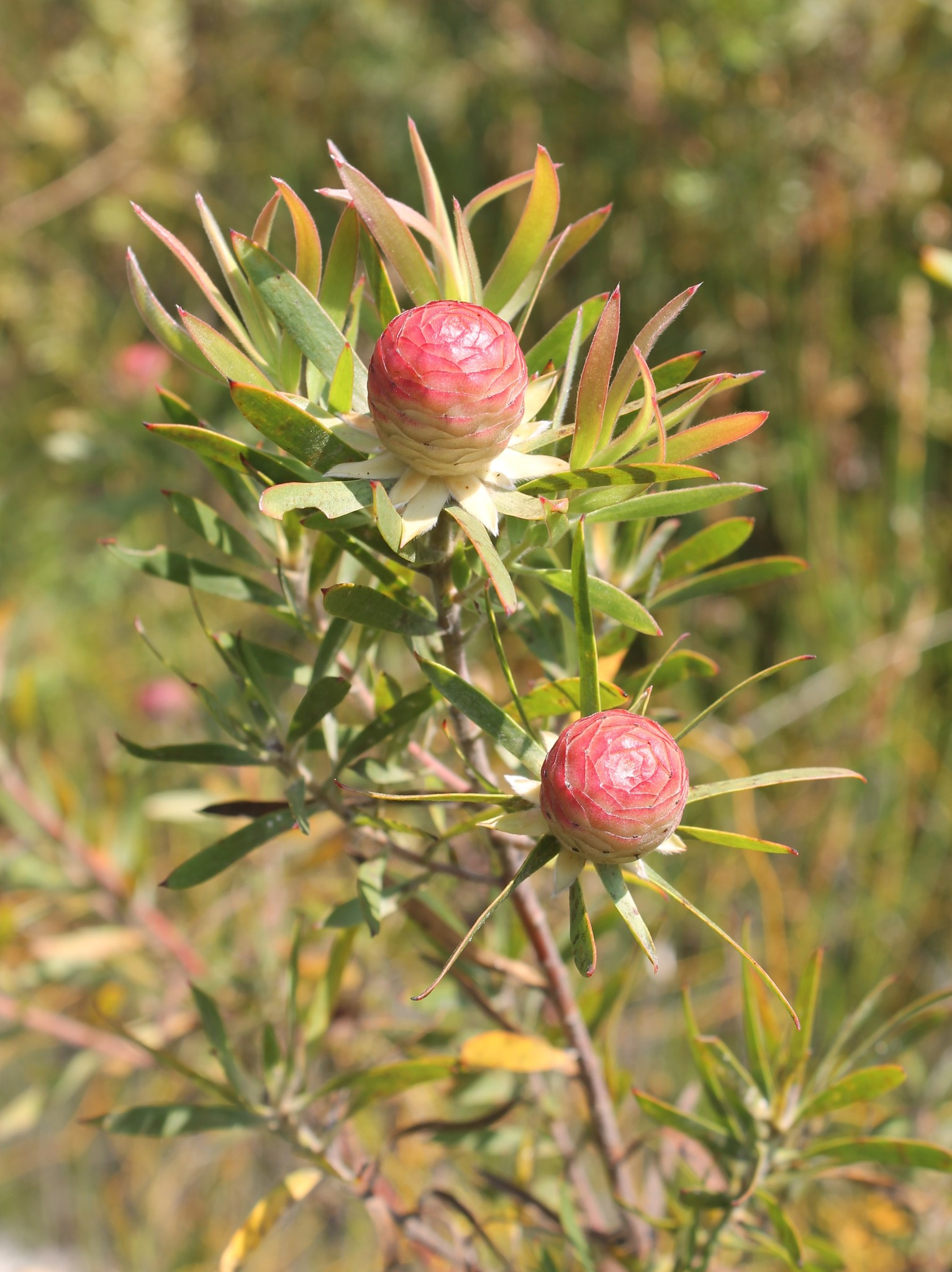

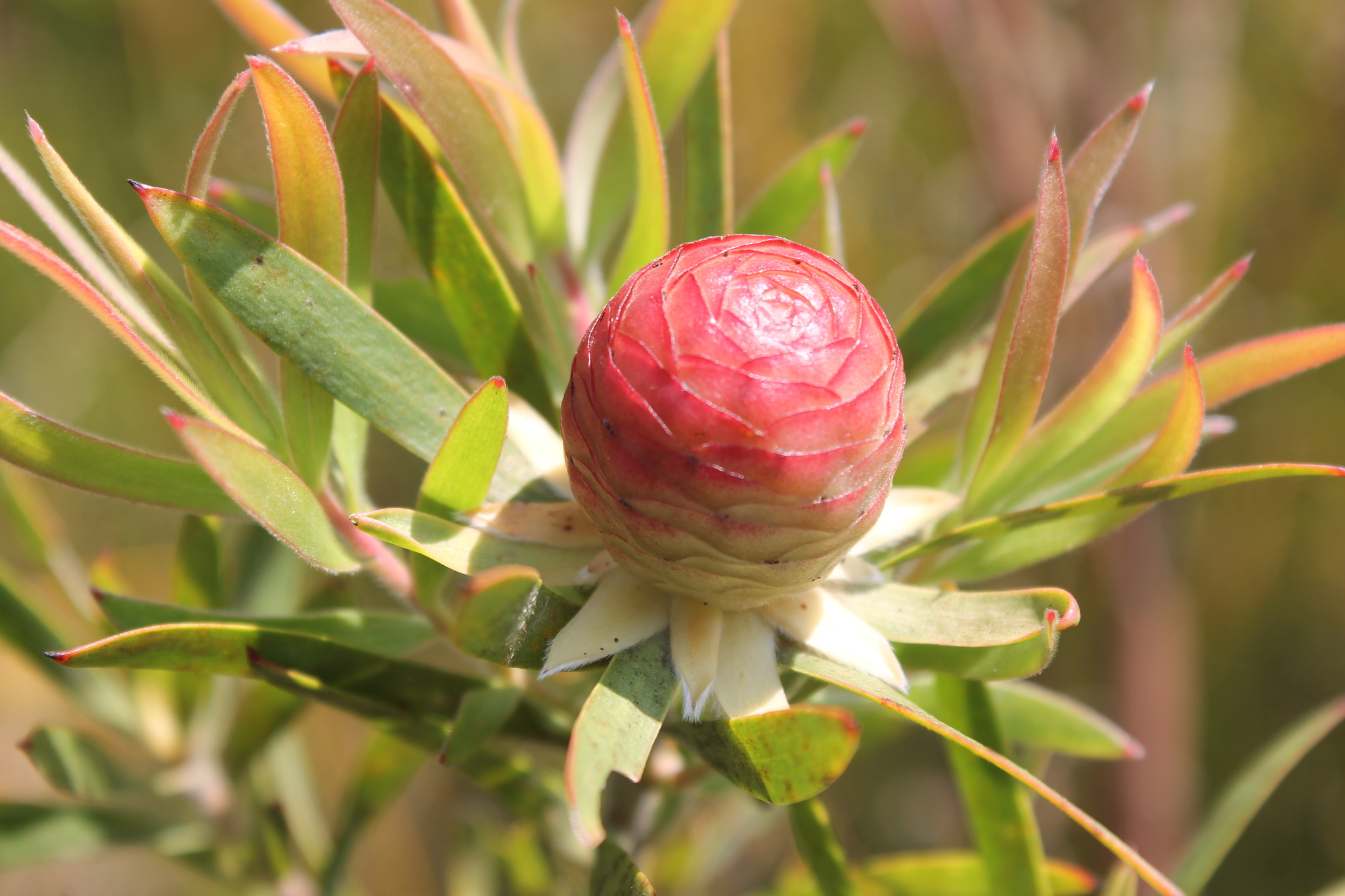
