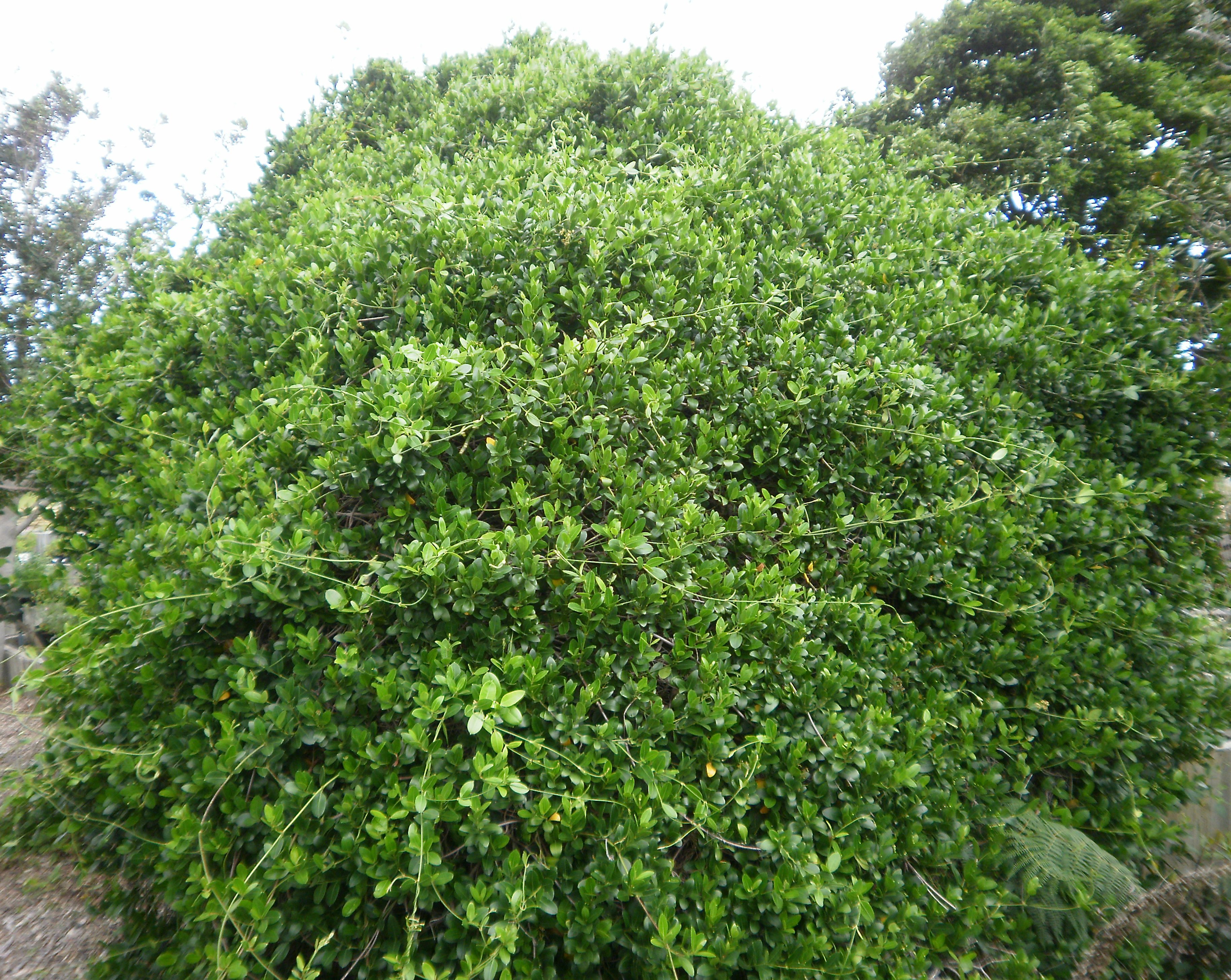

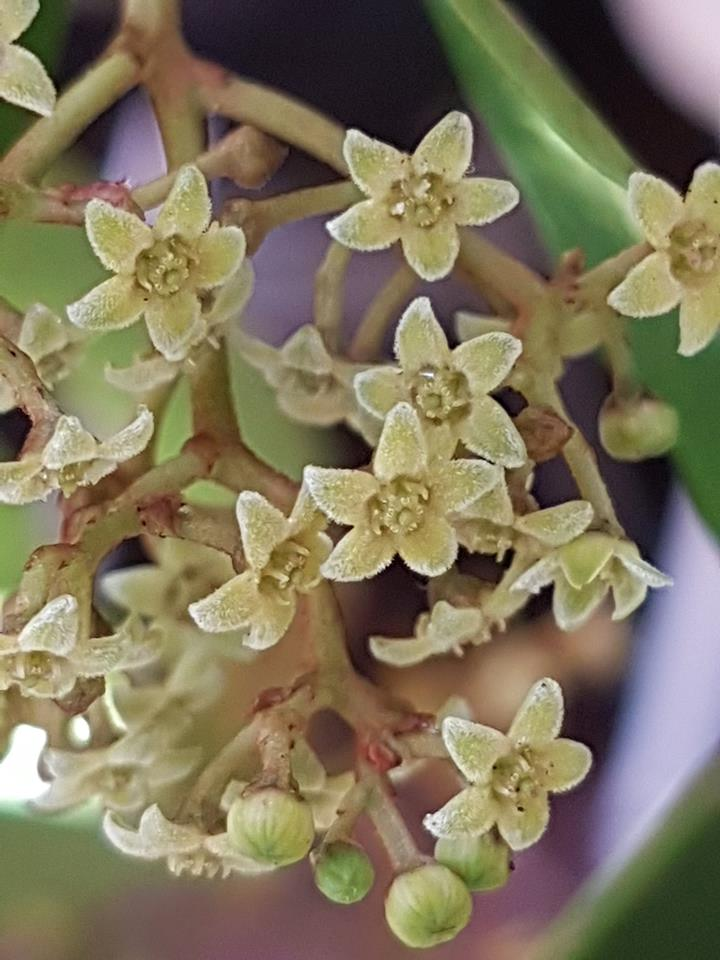

Scientific classification
- Kingdom: Plantae
- Clade: Tracheophytes
- Clade: Angiosperms
- Clade: Eudicots
- Clade: Asterids
- Order: Gentianales
- Family: Apocynaceae
- Genus: Secamone
- Species: S. alpini

Binomial name
- Secamone alpini Schult.

= Secamone alpini =

Monkey rope

Species of plant

Secamone alpini (also known as monkey rope or melktou) is a species of forest creeper in the family Apocynaceae. Its natural habitat is the afro-montane forests of eastern and southern Africa, from Kenya to Cape Province.
