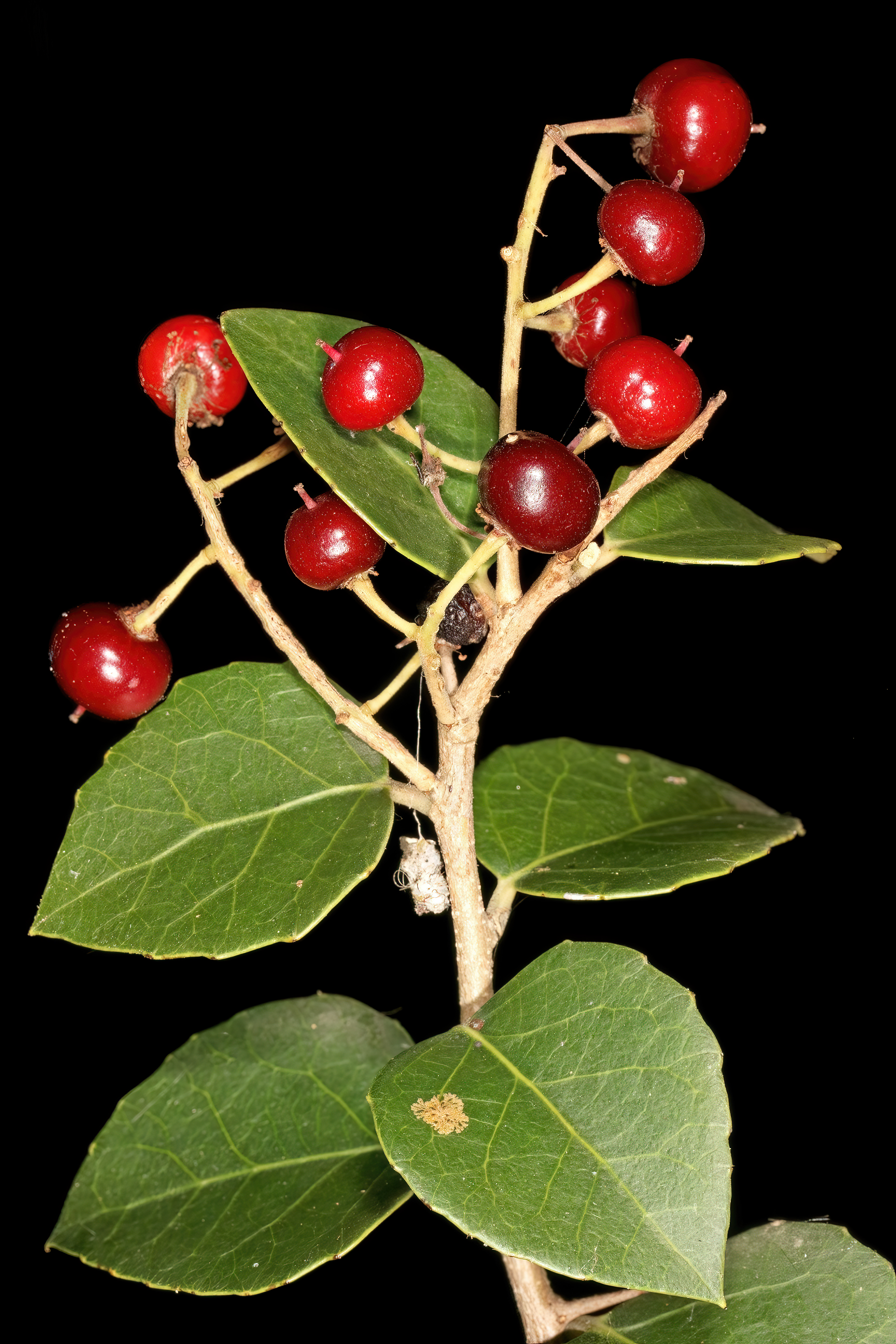

Scientific classification
- Kingdom: Plantae
- Clade: Tracheophytes
- Clade: Angiosperms
- Clade: Eudicots
- Clade: Rosids
- Order: Malpighiales
- Family: Salicaceae
- Genus: Scolopia
- Species: S. zeyheri

Binomial name
- Scolopia zeyheri (Nees) Szyszyl.

= Scolopia zeyheri =

Species of tree

Scolopia zeyheri is an evergreen, much-branched shrub or tree usually growing to about 13 –25 metres. Its named after Carl Zeyher, 1799 - 1858, a German naturalist.
