= Grootrivier Pass =

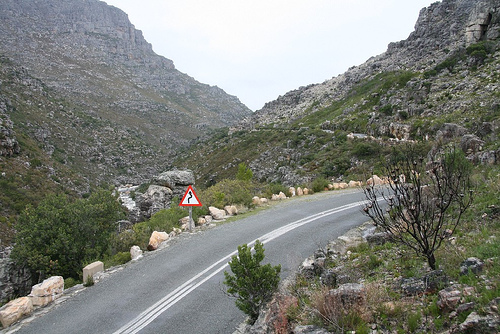
- Western section of pass

- Location within Western Cape

Third Approach
- Location: Western Cape, South Africa
- Coordinates: 33°57′S 23°34′E

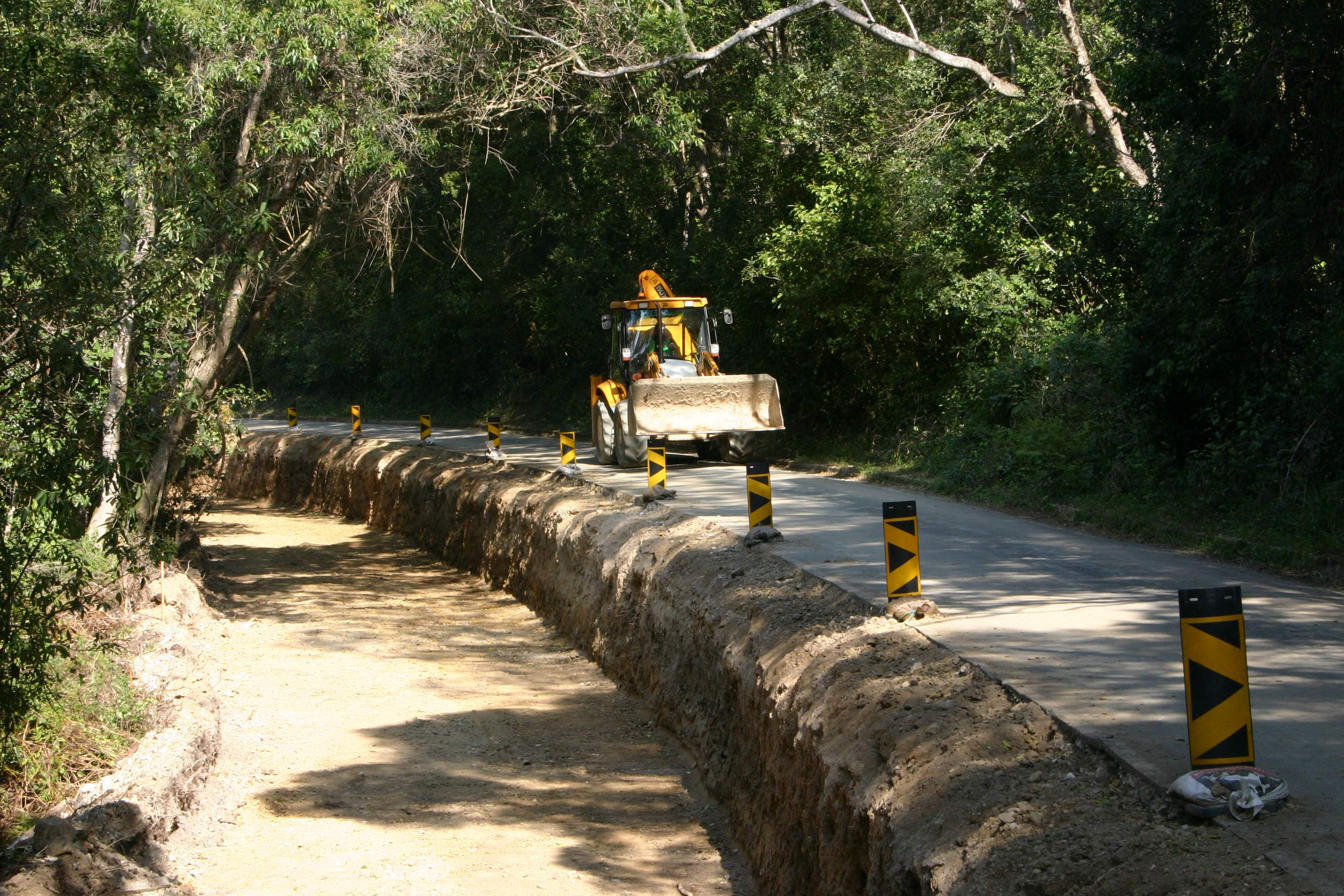
Reconstruction of eastern section in 2010

Grootrivier Pass, is situated in the Western Cape province of South Africa on the R102 regional road. The Grootrivier (Afrikaans for "Great River") is one of various mountain streams that over millions of years have cut through the coastal plateau towards the sea.

The R102 winds its way from the N2 on the coastal plateau, which is an ancient sea-bed now at 220m above sea-level, through dense coastal forest, down to the resort of Nature's Valley on the Grootrivier and then climbs the opposite slope, back to the plateau. The pass was finished in 1880 by Thomas Bain and major reconstruction was carried out on both sections in 2010. The route from plateau down to sea-level and then back to the plateau, was dictated by the wide and deep gorge carved by the Grootrivier and stretching inland to the Tsitsikamma Mountains. Modern bridge-building techniques spanned the three gorges of the Grootrivier, the Bloukrans River and the Storms River, allowing the opening of the freeway in June 1984. The forest is home to a myriad of bird species as well as small antelope, vervet monkeys, baboons and leopards. The road features various viewpoints and picnic spots.

== See also ==
- Van Stadens Pass
- Bloukrans Pass (Western Cape)
