= Zanthoxylum leprieurii =

Scientific classification
- Kingdom: Plantae
- Clade: Tracheophytes
- Clade: Angiosperms
- Clade: Eudicots
- Clade: Rosids
- Order: Sapindales
- Family: Rutaceae
- Genus: Zanthoxylum
- Species: Z. leprieurii

Binomial name
- Zanthoxylum leprieurii Guill. & Perr.

Species of tree

Zanthoxylum leprieurii is a low branching medium-sized tree of the Rutaceae family. It can reach 24 m (79 ft) in height and up to 40 cm (16 in) in diameter. Some parts of the plant are used in African folk medicine.

== Description ==
Stems often have conical, woody prickle-bearing protuberances up to 6 cm (2.4 in) long. Leaves alternate, and are imparipinnately compound, with 8-17 leaflets. Leaflets are 15-55 cm (22 in) long.

== Distribution ==
This plant spans Tropical Africa, from Senegal to Ethiopia and reaches Mozambique.

== Uses ==
Extracts from the stem and root bark have applications in traditional healing practices. They are used as part of a decoction to treat venereal diseases, body pain, dysentery, urinary infections, male impotence and intestinal worms. Leaf extracts are used as a topical wound treatment, kidney pain arthritis, bleeding gums and sores.

Though not known for its durability, its wood is used to build canoes and boats, drums, crates and boxes.
