= Storms River Pass =

Mountain pass in South Africa

Storms River Pass is a mountain pass covering the Storms River ravine in Eastern Cape, South Africa, near the town of Stormsrivier.

== History ==
Thomas Charles John Bain built the pass as part of a joint project with Bloukrans Pass and Grootrivier Pass, starting construction on the three in 1879. Storms River Pass, through which the N2 national road once ran, was the last of the three to be finished in 1885. Since the completion of the Paul Sauer Bridge in 1964, the pass has only been used for mountain biking.
