= Garden Route National Park =

Coastal national park in South Africa

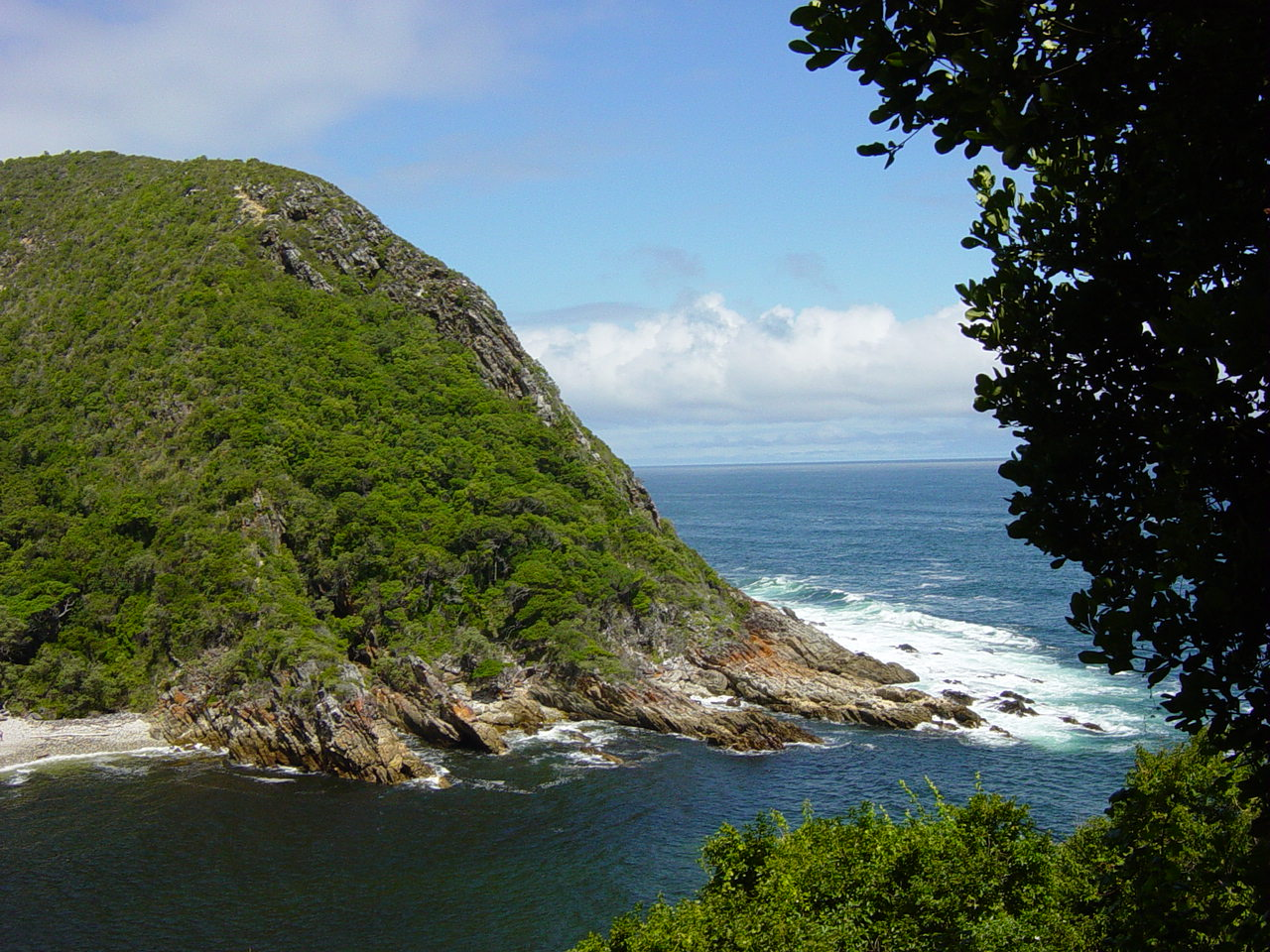
- Storms River Mouth in the Tsitsikamma section of the park
- Location of the park
- Location: Western Cape & Eastern Cape, South Africa
- Nearest city: George
- Coordinates: 34°0′S 23°15′E
- Area: 1,210 km^{2} (470 sq mi)
- Established: 6 March 2009
- Governing body: South African National Parks
- Website: www.sanparks.org/parks/garden-route
- Garden Route National Park (South Africa)

The Garden Route National Park is a national park in the Garden Route region of the Western Cape and Eastern Cape provinces in South Africa. It is a coastal reserve well known for its indigenous forests, dramatic coastline, and the Otter Trail. It was established on 6 March 2009 by amalgamating the existing Tsitsikamma and Wilderness National Parks, the Knysna National Lake Area, and various other areas of state-owned land.

The park covers about 1,210 km^{2} (470 sq mi) of land; of this, about 685 km^{2} (264 sq mi) was already part of the predecessor national parks. The park includes a continuous complex of approximately 605 km^{2} (234 sq mi) of indigenous forest.

The Garden Route National Park (Tsitsikamma, Knysna and Wilderness Sections) has a pleasant, temperate climate; it is unique in Africa as the only area in which rainfall occurs throughout the year.

== Sections ==
=== Tsitsikamma section ===
The Tsitsikamma section of the park covers an 80 km (50 mi) stretch of coastline with Nature's Valley at the western end of the park. The section is known for its indigenous forests, dramatic coastline, and the Otter Trail. The main accommodation is at Storms River Mouth. Near the park is the Bloukrans Bridge, the world's highest bridge bungee jump at 216 metres (709 ft).

=== Wilderness section ===
The Wilderness section is located around the seaside town of Wilderness, Western Cape between the larger towns of George, Sedgefield and Knysna, in the Western Cape. It stretches from the Touw River mouth to the Swartvlei estuary and beyond, where it links with the Goukamma Nature Reserve, giving protection to five lakes and the Serpentine, which is the winding strip of water joining Island Lake to the Touw River at the Ebb and Flow Rest Camp. This section of the park protects three major zones of indigenous forest, four types of fynbos (wild shrubs), plus various lakes and winding waterways. There are also a number of archaeologically significant sites.
