= Disa newdigateae =

Scientific classification
- Kingdom: Plantae
- Clade: Tracheophytes
- Clade: Angiosperms
- Clade: Monocots
- Order: Asparagales
- Family: Orchidaceae
- Subfamily: Orchidoideae
- Genus: Disa
- Species: D. newdigateae

Binomial name
- Disa newdigateae L.Bolus

Synonyms
- Herschelia newdigateae (L.Bolus) H.P.Linder; Herschelianthe newdigateae (L.Bolus) N.C.Anthony

Species of flowering plant

Disa newdigateae is a perennial plant and geophyte belonging to the genus Disa and is part of the fynbos. The plant is endemic to the Western Cape and occurs at The Crags. There is only one subpopulation, six plants were collected here from 1895 to 1931. Once feared extinct as it hadn't been recorded since 1935, it was rediscovered in 2018 within the Garden Route National Park.
