= Thomas Charles John Bain =

South African engineer (1830–1893)

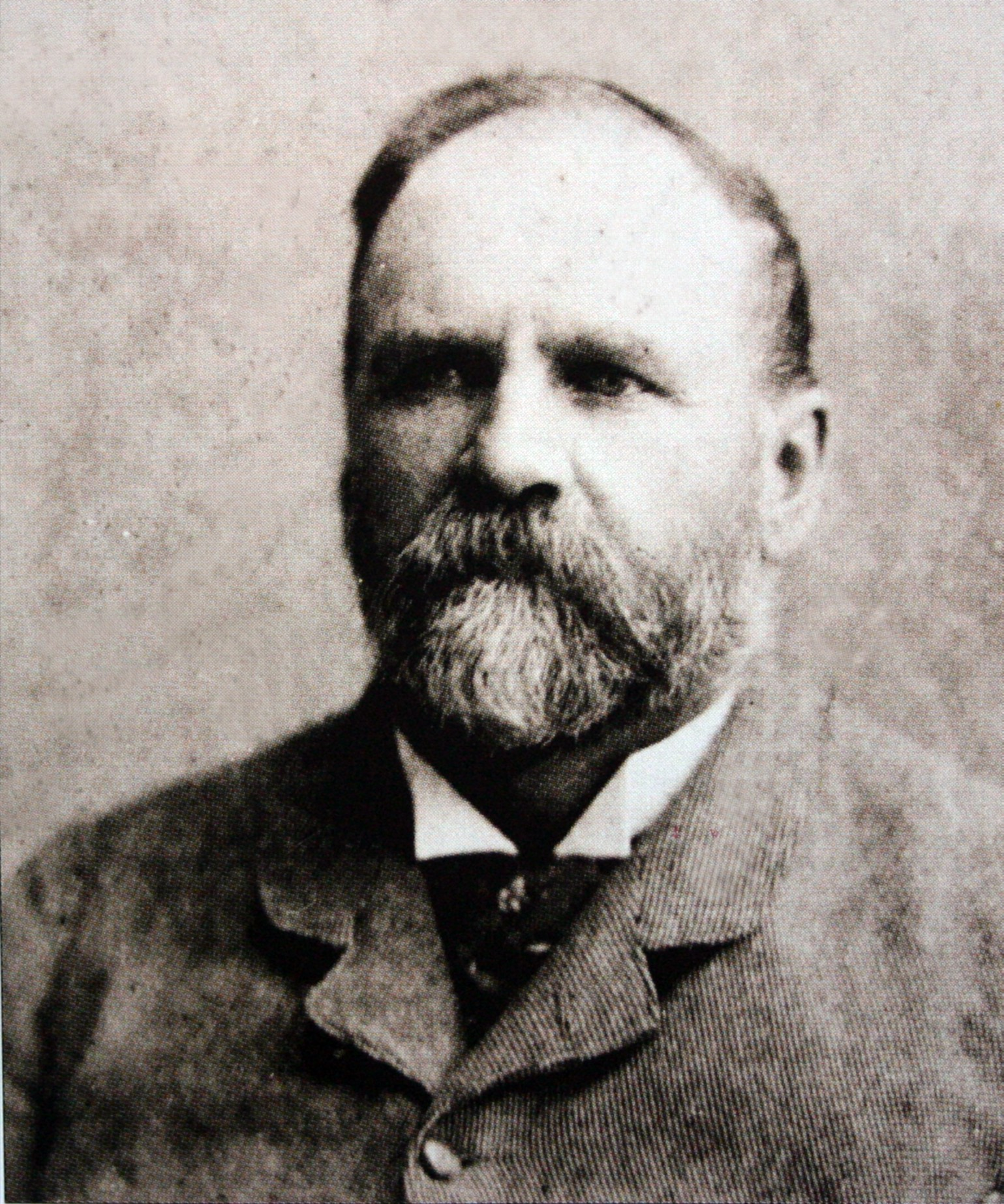
- Born: 30 September 1830; Graaff-Reinet
- Died: 29 September 1893 (aged 62)
- Occupation: road engineer

Thomas Charles John Bain (29 September 1830 – 29 September 1893) was a South African road engineer. Bain was responsible for the planning and construction of more than 900 km of roads and mountain passes, many of them still in use today, over a career spanning from 1848 until 1888. These passes through the mountain ranges between the thin coastal plain and the interior of the former Cape Colony in South Africa, played a major role in opening up the vast hinterland of South Africa.

== Biography ==
Bain was born in 1830 at Graaff Reinet, at that stage a frontier town in the Cape Colony in Southern Africa. His father, Andrew Geddes Bain, was born in Scotland and settled in the Cape Colony in 1816 at the age of 19.

Bain and his six brothers and six sisters were educated largely at home like most settlers' children of that period. The children's education was interrupted by the outbreak of the War of the Axe in 1846, one of several frontier wars that raged during that era. Thomas served as a volunteer in the war and helped to guard women and children who sheltered in the church of the frontier town of Fort Beaufort.

He married Johanna Hermina de Smidt in 1854. They had 13 children and enjoyed a long and happy marriage. Johanna was the ninth child of Willem de Smidt, the Secretary of the Central Road Board. Georgina Bain (16 November 1860 Knysna – 6 December 1954), one of his daughters, married the Conservator of Forests, Joseph Storr Lister (1 October 1852 Cape Town – 27 February 1927, and wrote Reminiscences of Georgina Lister.

== Career ==
In order to cross the coastal mountain ranges of the former Cape Colony, Charles Michell (Surveyor-General, Civil Engineer and Superintendent of Works) and John Montagu (British Colonial Secretary for the Cape Colony) introduced a road building program. Their goal was achieved by the father-and-son combination of Andrew and Thomas Bain, whose civil engineering prowess effected a quantum leap in the quality and range of the road network of the 19th-century Cape Colony.

Thomas served his apprenticeship from 1848 to 1854 as his father's assistant in the capacity of Assistant Inspector of Roads. In this capacity he was involved in the construction of Michell's Pass near Ceres and Bainskloof pass near Wellington. After passing first in the Government examinations in 1854, he was promoted to Roads Inspector for the Western Province. Thomas and his father's careers as road builders continued to be intertwined until Andrew's death in 1864.

Bain built 24 major mountain roads and passes in the second half of the 1800s. His father built eight during the first half of the same century. One of the few passes in South Africa not built by a Bain during that period was Montagu Pass from George to Oudtshoorn, which was built in 1843–47 by Henry Fancourt White, a road engineer from Australia. Bain's first road construction project as newly promoted Roads Inspector was Grey's Pass (renamed Piekenierskloof pass after it was reconstructed in 1958), completed in 1858, that opened up the Olifantsriver valley to the Swartland and the Cape Town market.

One of Bain's major achievements was the construction of the road on the coastal plain between George and the forestry town of Knysna. The project was started in 1867 and took 15 years to complete. This road linked Knysna to the more developed areas towards Cape Town and replaced the dreaded river crossing at Kaaimansgat which early travelers described with trepidation. This project was followed by a series of passes across the Langeberg and Outeniqua mountain ranges. These passes include the Robinson, Tradouw, Garcia and Burgers Passes as well as the Kogmanskloof road. Then followed the 185 km Tsitsikama road, linking the western and eastern portions of the Cape Colony through the indigenous forests of the coastal plain. This road involved the crossing of major ravines, including the Grootriver, Bobbejaansriver, Bloukransriver and Stormsriver gorges.

In March 1873 Bain was appointed as district engineer in the Railway Department. Due to a lack of a suitable candidate to fill the position in the Road Department that he vacated, he rejoined the Road Department after 18 months. In 1877 he became an Associate of the Institution of Civil Engineers.

Bain's crowning achievement was the Swartberg Pass that connects Oudtshoorn, the largest town in the Little Karoo, with Prince Albert beyond the Swartberg mountains in the open plains of the Great Karoo. Construction on the scenic 24 km long Swartberg pass started in 1884 and was completed in 1887. Bain was assisted by another road engineer, John Tassie, who built the last 6 km of the road leading out of the mountain pass into Prince Albert. At the same time, Bain was also in charge of the construction of the Schoemanspoort pass that connects the Swartberg pass with Oudtshoorn. Bain's last road-building project was the construction of Victoria Road in 1887, a coastal road linking Sea Point with Camps Bay and beyond. The route from Cape Town reached it via Kloof Nek, the pass between Table Mountain and Lion’s Head.

In 1888 Bain resigned from the Road Department and accepted the position of Irrigation and Geological Surveyor of the (Cape) Colony. His career with the Road Department resulted in the creation of multiple mountain passes in South Africa. He continued his work in his new capacity until his death. During his tenure he designed and completed the Verkeerdevlei reservoir, amongst other projects.

== Construction projects ==
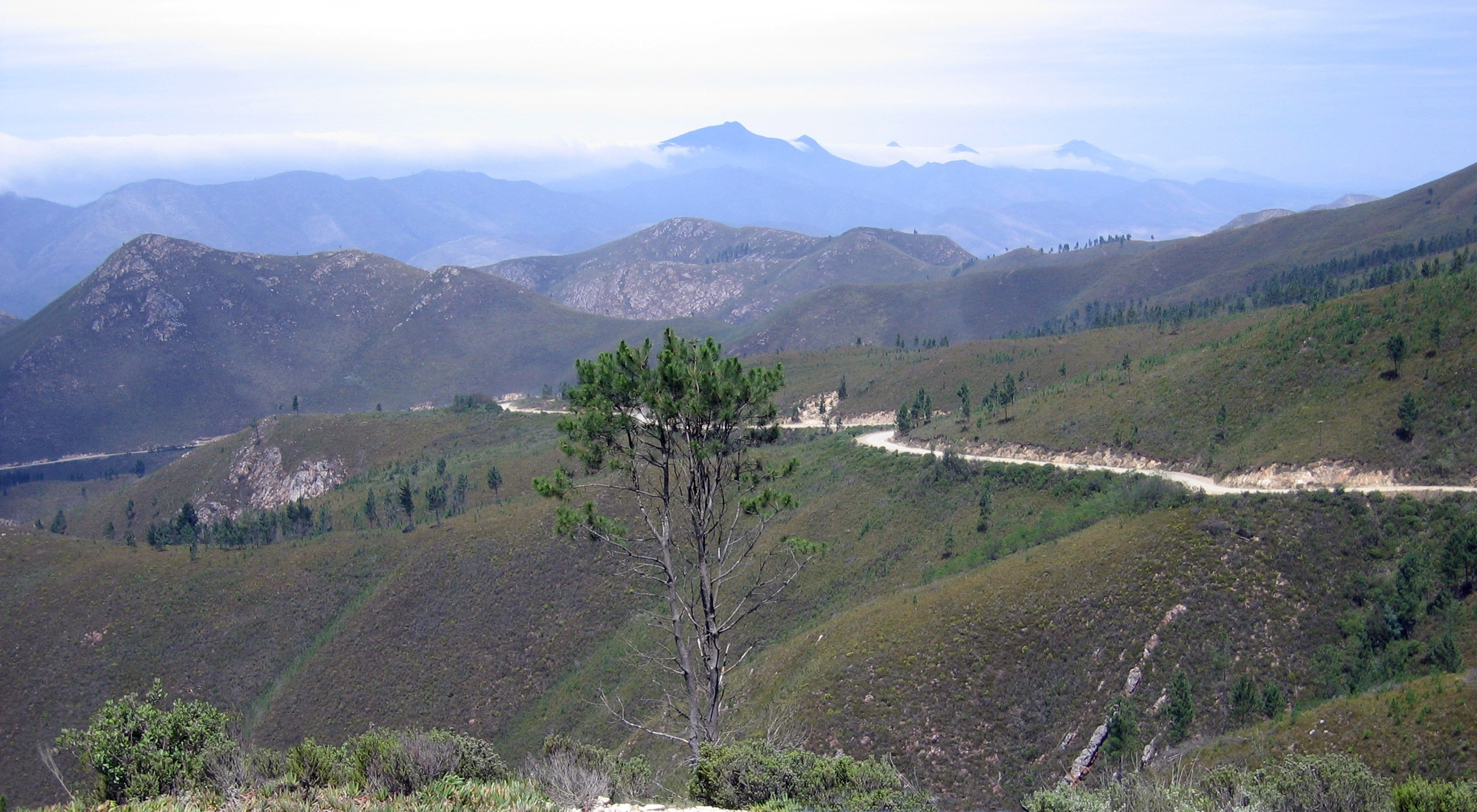
Prince Alfred's Pass

1. Meiring's Poort (after local farmer Petrus Johannes Meiring), 16 km long 1854–58
2. Grey's Pass near Citrusdal (after Sir George Grey), 11 km long 1857–58 (Piekenier's Kloof 1958)
3. Tulbagh Kloof (after the town of Tulbagh), 5 km long 1859–60
4. Seweweekspoort (thought to be after Berlin Mission Society preacher Louis Zerwick) from Laingsburg through Swartberg, 17 km long 1859–62
5. Prince Alfred's Pass (after Prince Alfred) from Knysna to Uniondale, 70 km long 1863–67
6. Seven Passes road (after number of passes along route) from George to Knysna, 75 km long, ending in the Homtini Pass near Knysna 1867–83
7. Robinson Pass (after Chief Inspector of Public Works, Murrell Robinson) from Oudtshoorn to Mossel Bay 1867–69
8. Tradouw Pass (Boschkloof, Southey Pass) near Barrydale, 13 km long 1869–73
9. Garcia's Pass (after Maurice Garcia) from Riversdale to Ladismith, 18 km long 1873–77
10. Pakhuis Pass (after Pakhuisberg, a branch of the Krakadouw Mountains) from Clanwilliam to Calvinia, Cederberg 1875–77
11. Koo Pass or Burger's Pass (after Koodoosberg) near Montagu 1875–1877
12. Rooihoogte Pass, also near Montagu 1875–1877
13. Verlaten Kloof Pass from Sutherland to Matjiesfontein -1877
14. Cogmans, Kogmans or Kockemans Kloof (after a Khoikhoi clan) from Ashton to Montagu, 5 km long 1873
15. Swartberg Pass from Oudtshoorn to Prince Albert, 24 km long 1880–88 (John Tassie built 6 km of road from Prince Albert end)
16. Baviaanskloof from Willowmore to Patensie, 3 km long 1880–90
17. Bloukrans Pass near Nature's Valley
18. Grootrivier Pass at Nature's Valley
19. Storms River Pass on the Garden Route
