= Otter Trail =

Hiking trail along the Garden Route coast, South Africa

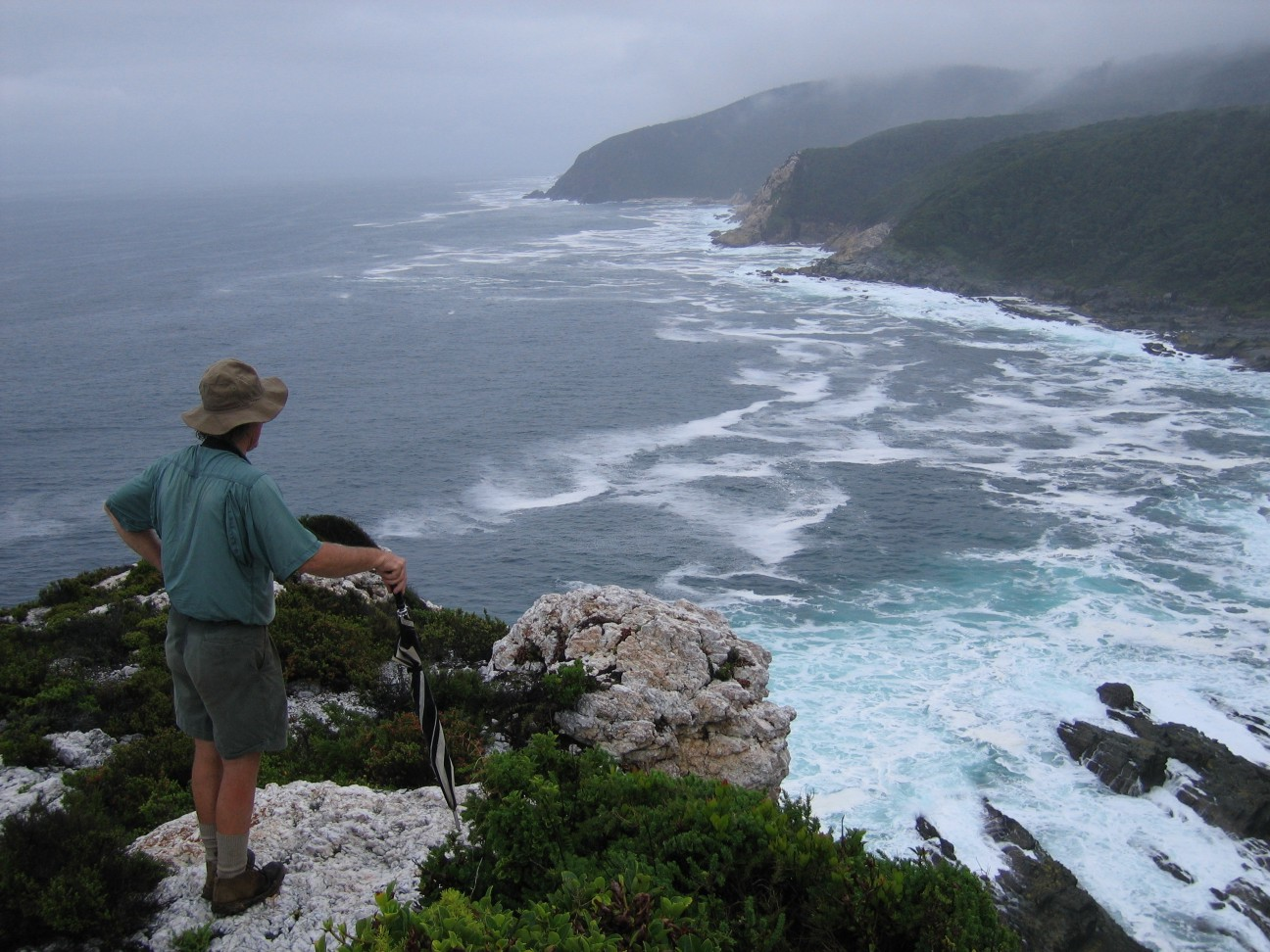
- View from Skilderkrans across Bloubaai-Wes
- Length: 41 km (25 mi)
- Location: Garden Route, South Africa
- Trailheads: Storms River Mouth; Nature's Valley
- Use: Hiking

The Otter Trail is a hiking trail along the Garden Route coast of South Africa and is named for the Cape clawless otter which occurs in this region. This trail is widely regarded as one of the finest in the world and stretches from Storms River Mouth in the east to Nature's Valley in the west, is 26 km long as the crow flies and 44 km as the hiker walks. Walking the trail takes 5 days, and the 4 nights are spent in comfortable huts with superb views. The route is located entirely within the Tsitsikamma National Park, which protects an 80 km long strip of coastal mountains, forest and beaches.

The trail traverses a very scenic landscape, never straying far from the shoreline, but often climbing steeply and then descending to the beach or a river crossing. Vegetation along the way is either fynbos, dense gallery forest or open, rocky sections near the sea with an abundance of wildflowers.

== Trail landmarks ==
- Storms River Mouth 34°01′15.6″S 23°52′48″E
- Ngubu huts 34°01′2.9″S 23°50′31.2″E
- Oakhurst huts 33°59′42.7″S 23°44′2.5″E
- Scott hut 34°00′22.4″S 23°47′10.1″E
- André huts 33°58′45″S 23°37′5.3″E
- Grootrivier, Nature's Valley 33°58′56″S 23°34′36″E

== Trail stages ==
- Day 1 - 4.8 km (± 2 hours) Storms River Mouth - Ngubu
- Day 2 - 7.9 km (± 4 hours) Ngubu - Scott
- Day 3 - 7.7 km (± 4 hours) Scott - Oakhurst
- Day 4 - 13.8 km (± 6 hours) Oakhurst - André
- Day 5 - 9.8 km (previously 6.8 km) (± 3 hours) Vasselot - Nature's Valley
- Total distance 44 km

== Elevation distances - vertical climb and descent ==
- Day 1 - 561 m total vertical - Climb 188 m - Descent -373 m
- Day 2 - 1480 m total vertical - Climb 746 m - Descent -734 m
- Day 3 - 1257 m total vertical - Climb 623 m - Descent -634 m
- Day 4 - 1905 m total vertical - Climb 945 m - Descent -960 m
- Day 5 - 926 m total vertical - Climb 466 m - Descent -460 m
- Total elevation gain: 2 968m

== Gallery ==
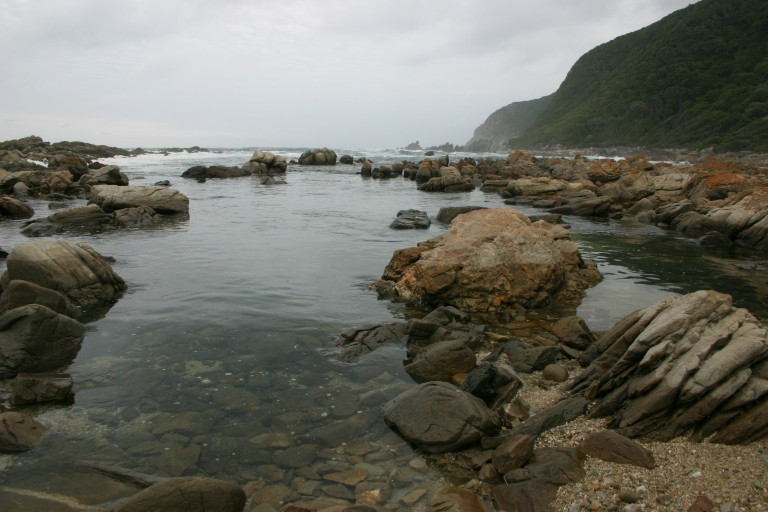
Tidal pools at Ngubu huts

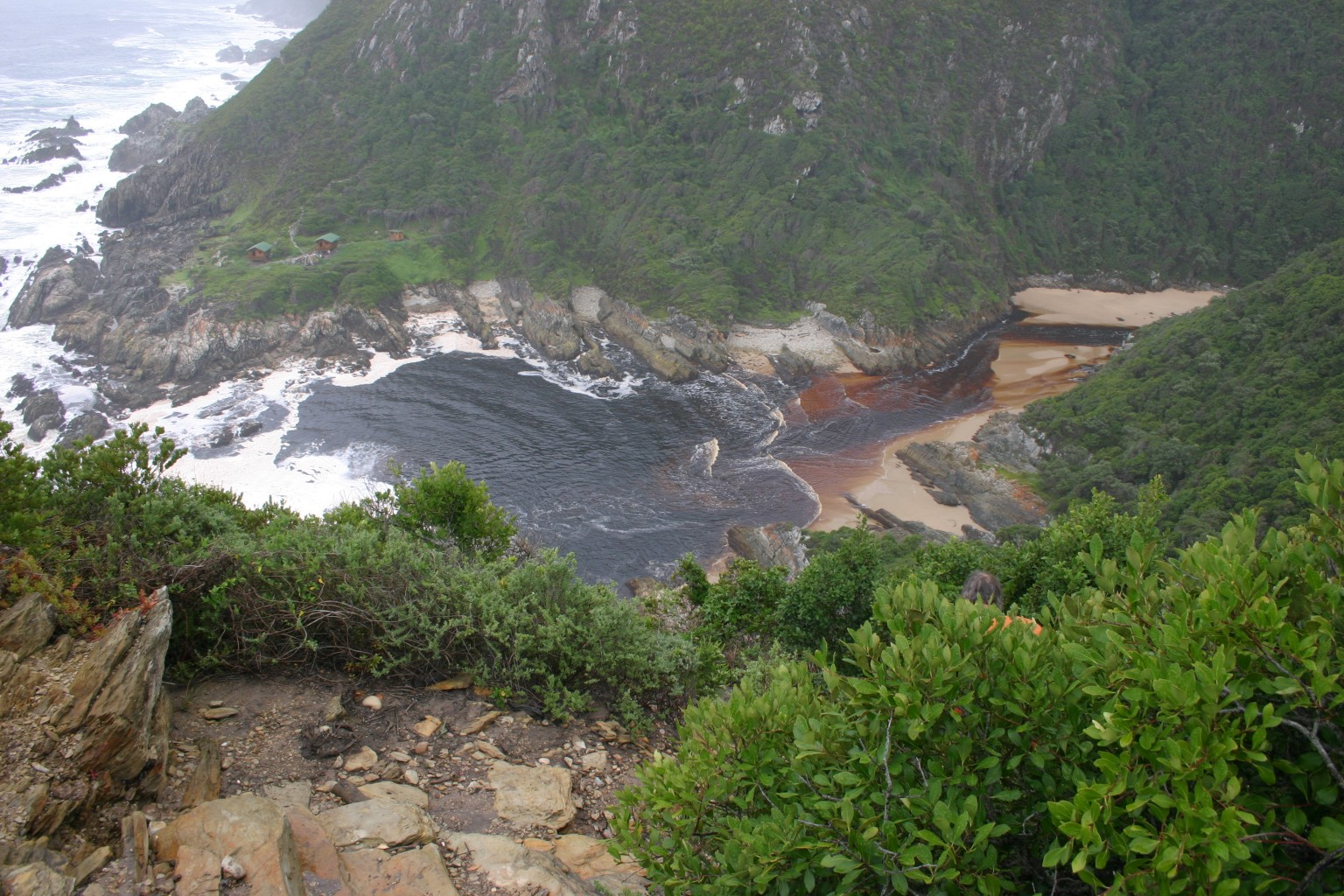
Oakhurst huts at Lottering estuary

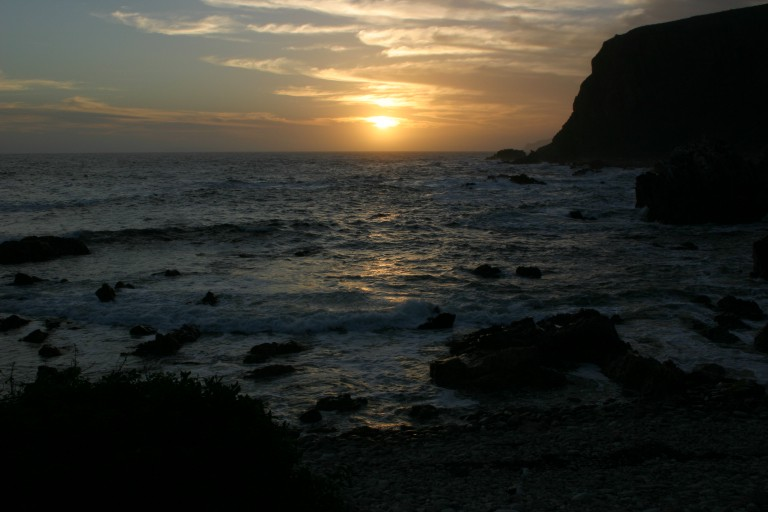
Sunset at André huts, Kliprivier

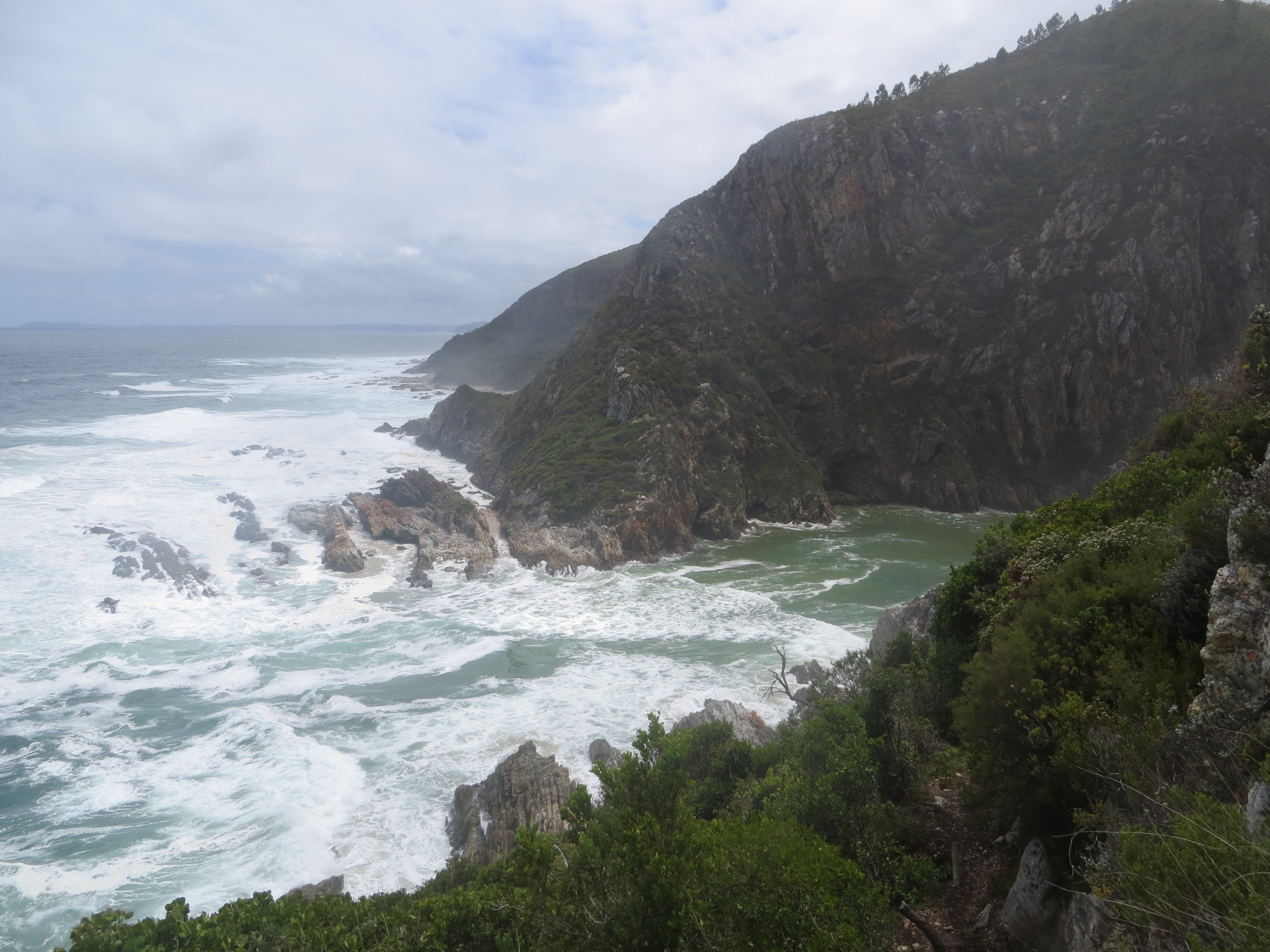
Bloukrans river mouth

== See also ==
- South African National Parks
