= Bloukrans Bridge Bungy =

Commercial bungy jumping site in South Africa

Coordinates: 33°57′55″S 23°38′50″E

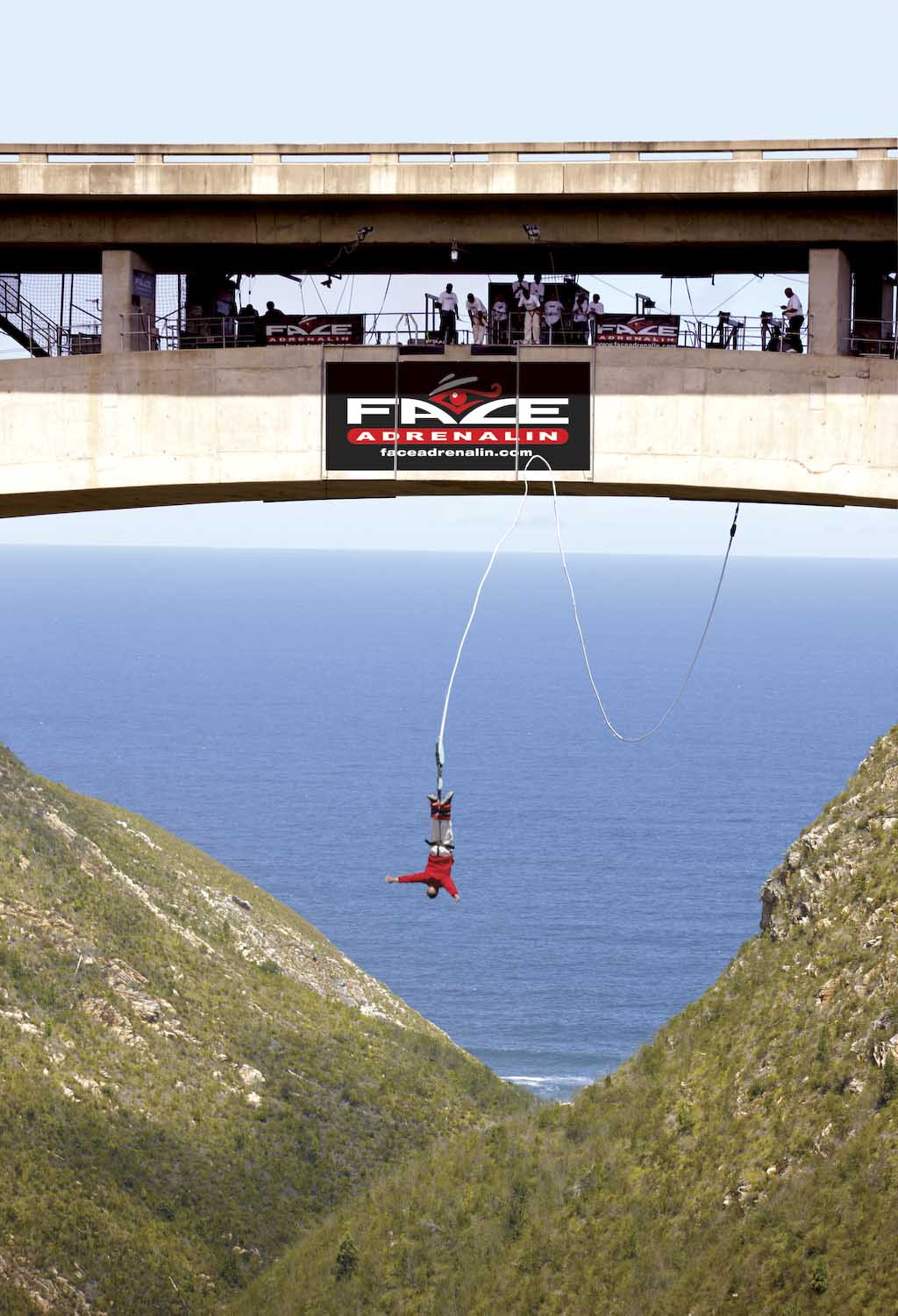
Face Adrenalin Bloukrans Bridge Bungy Jump

Location of the Bloukrans River Bridge on the border of the Western Cape and Eastern Cape, South Africa

Bloukrans Bridge Bungy is one of the world's highest commercial bungy jumping sites at 216 metres (709 ft) above the Bloukrans River. It is situated at Bloukrans Bridge on the N2 Highway at the border between the Eastern Cape and the Western Cape in the Tsitsikamma area of South Africa's Garden Route. It has been operated by Face Adrenalin commercially since 1997.

== History ==
In 1990, the Bloukrans River Bridge became the first African bridge for bungee jumping. Face Adrenalin founded by Devan tuohey has been operating the Bloukrans Bridge Bungy accident free since 1997.

== World records ==
Mohr Keet set a Guinness World Record as the oldest person to bungy jump when he jumped from Bloukrans Bridge on 6 April 2010 at the age of 96.

Scott Huntly broke the world record for the Most bungee jumps in a day when he jumped from Bloukrans Bridge 107 times in nine hours on 11 May 2011. Scott completed the project to raise funds for local communities.

The world record for the most bungy jumps in 24 hours was held by South African Bill Boshoff who performed 101 bungy jumps in 14 hours and 23 minutes at Bloukrans on 10 May 2002.

The record stood until 16 August 2008 when Mike Heard broke the record with 103 bungy jumps within 24 hours from Auckland's Harbour Bridge.

Veronica Dean-Boshoff set a world record for achieving 19 jumps in one hour on 9 May 2002.

== Responsible tourism ==
The operators of Bloukrans Bridge Bungy, Face Adrenalin, employ 60 people from neighbouring communities – Coldstream, Thornham, Storms River, Covie, and The Crags - as part of the Bloukrans Bridge Bungy operation.

A significant percentage of turnover has been paid over to the local community trust since 1998.

== See also ==
- Macau Tower
- Contra Dam
