= Paul Sauer Bridge =

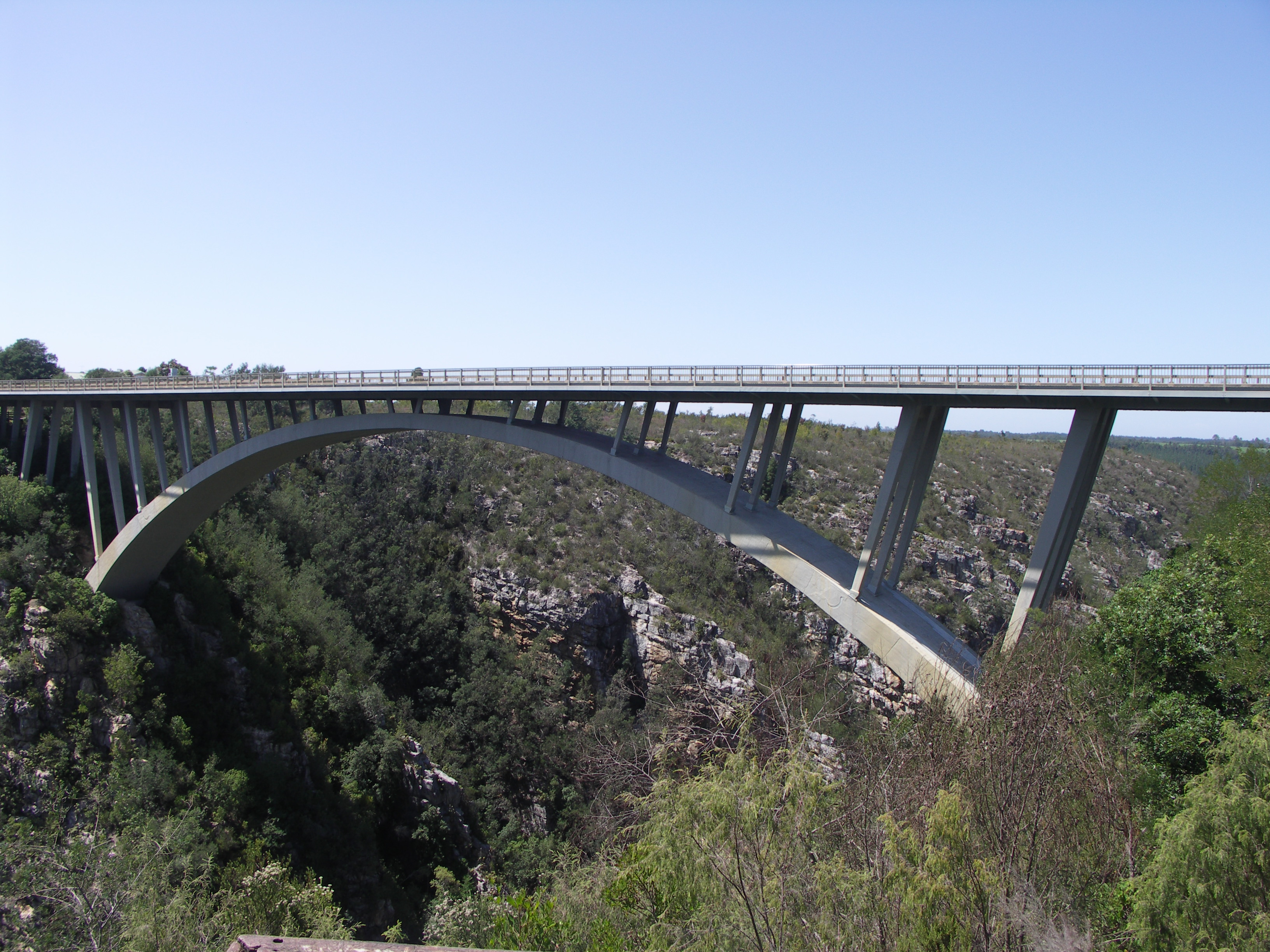
- The N2 concrete arch bridge over the Storms River
- Coordinates: 33°58′6.56″S 23°55′53.57″E
- Carries: N2 national highway.
- Crosses: Storms River
- Locale: Eastern Cape, South Africa

Characteristics
- Design: Arch bridge
- Material: Concrete
- Height: 120 metres (394 ft)
- Longest span: 100 metres (328 ft)

History
- Designer: Riccardo Morandi
- Construction start: 1953
- Construction end: 1956
- Construction cost: £100,000

Location
- Interactive map of Paul Sauer Bridge

The Paul Sauer Bridge, also known as the Storms River Bridge, is a deck arch bridge over the Storms River in the Eastern Cape of South Africa. The bridge is located on the Garden Route section of National Route 2, between Cape Town and Port Elizabeth. At a maximum height of 120 metres (394 ft) above the Storms River, it was the highest concrete arch in Africa until the Bloukrans Bridge, 216 metres (709 ft), opened on the same road in 1984.

It is named after Paul Sauer.

== Structural design ==
The bridge was designed by Italian engineer Riccardo Morandi, and constructed by Concor between 1953 and 1956.

It spans 100 metres (328 ft) and sits 120 metres (394 ft) above the river. The main span of the bridge consists of a reinforced concrete arch structure spanning between two concrete abutments located on the western and eastern sides of the river. The deck of the bridge consists of three main spans, the center span between the two abutments and the two approach spans up to the joint above the abutments. The reinforced concrete deck is supported by the arch by means of 12 sets three reinforced concrete columns or struts.

== Construction of the bridge ==
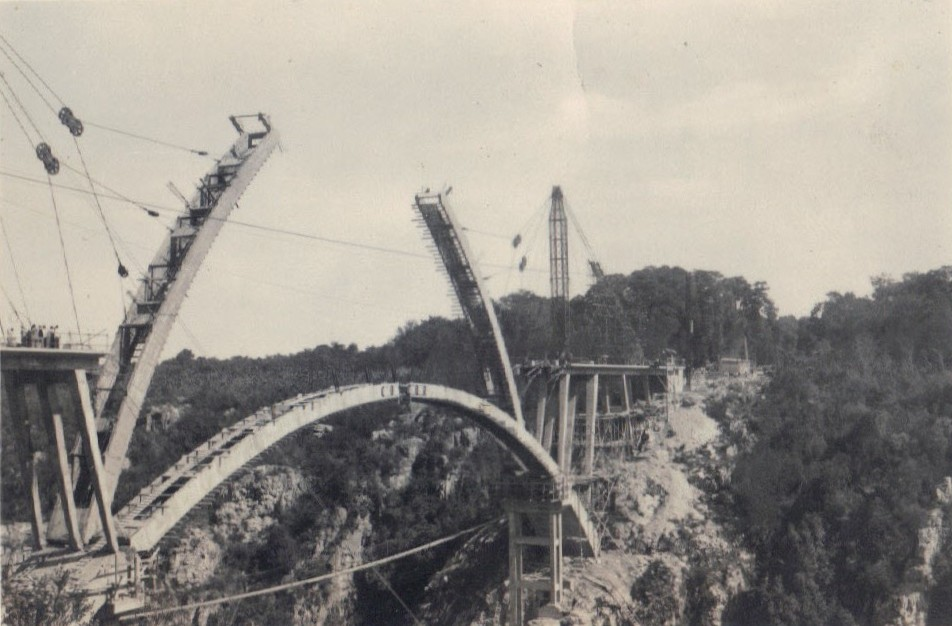
Second pair of concrete semi-arches being lowered into position

The main arch structure was constructed in a unique fashion: the complete arch was divided into four semi-arches which were built with climbing formwork in an essentially vertical position on opposite sides of the gorge. These were then rotated and lowered into position in pairs to meet at the centre, thus forming the completed arch structure.

== Maintenance ==
The Paul Sauer Bridge was renovated in 1986.
