= Langvlei =

Langvlei (Afrikaans for long marsh) may refer to:

- Langvlei, a neighbourhood in Paarl
- Bo-Langvlei, a lake in the Wilderness National Park
