= Bloukrans Pass =

Bloukrans Pass may refer to one of the following:

- Bloukrans Pass (Western Cape), on the R102 between Plettenberg Bay and Jeffreys Bay
- Bloukrans Pass (Northern Cape), on the R355 between Ceres and Calvinia

== See also ==
- Bloukrans River (disambiguation)
