= Bloukrans Pass (Western Cape) =

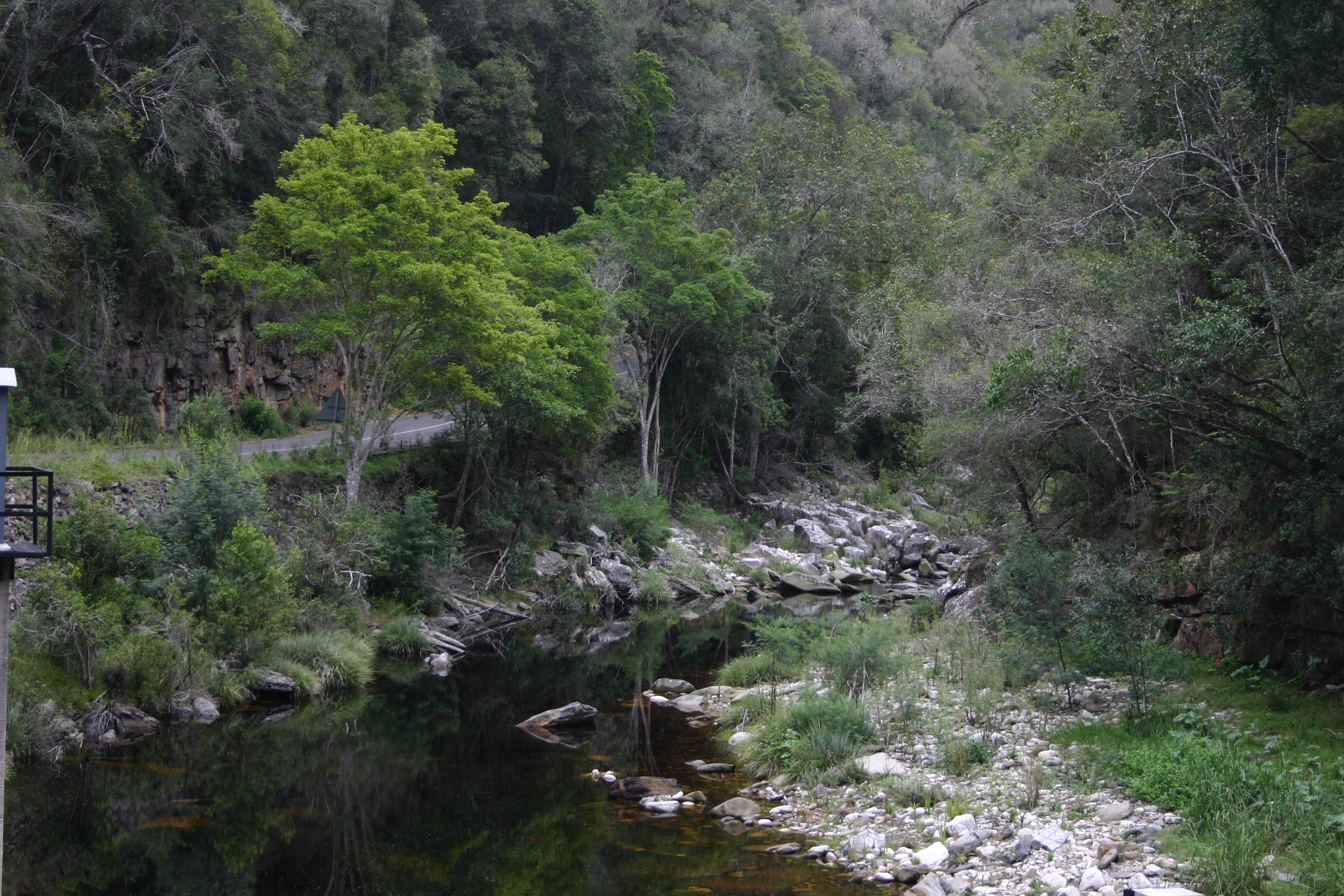
- Bloukrans Pass and Bloukrans River
- Elevation: 240 m (790 ft)
- Traversed by: R102

Third Approach
- Location: Garden Route National Park, Western Cape, South Africa
- Coordinates: 33°56′57″S 23°37′51″E
- Bloukrans Pass (Western Cape) (Western Cape)

The Bloukrans Pass is a pass through the ravine of the Bloukrans River on the R102 road between Plettenberg Bay and Jeffreys Bay in South Africa. The Bloukrans River forms the boundary between the Western Cape and Eastern Cape provinces. The pass no longer serves as the main route, as it has been bypassed by the Bloukrans Bridge which carries the N2 national road. The pass underwent major repairs during 2011 on the Western Cape side after flood damage in November 2007.

Since November 2007, the pass is permanently closed to traffic, although pedestrians and bicycles are able to utilise the pass for their respective purposes. The only way for motorists to travel between the two provinces in this region is by using the N2 national route (Bloukrans Bridge), where there is a tollgate.

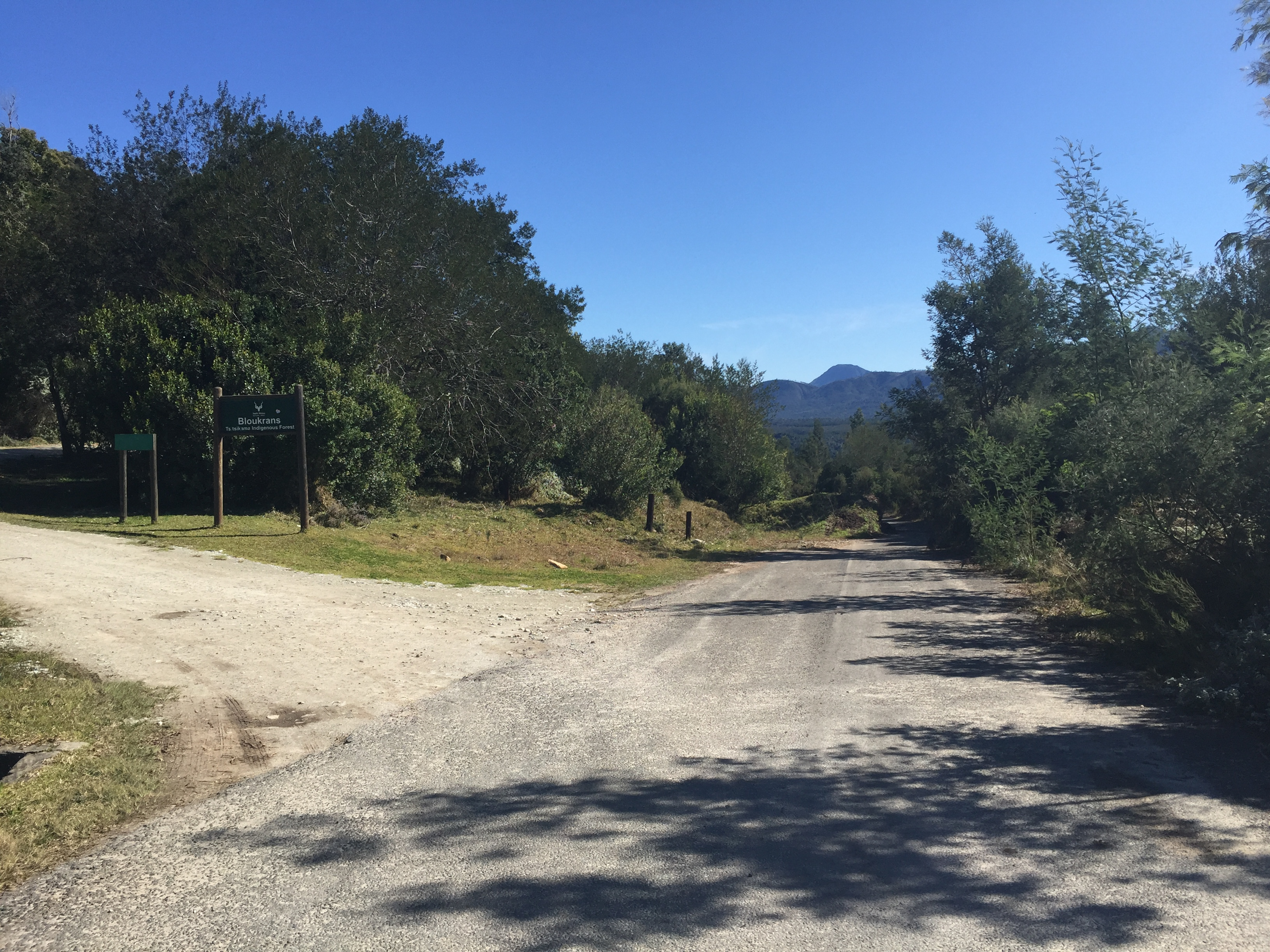
Entrance to the Tsitsikamma Forest.
