= Lindsay Hunt =

South African conservationist

- Born: South Africa
- Occupations: hunter; conservationist

Lindsay Hunt is a South African hunter turned conservationist who played an important role in a project to produce Cape buffalo breeding stock free of bovine tuberculosis and foot-and-mouth disease. The project has established disease-free herds in all nine provinces of South Africa, away from the TB-ravaged areas of the Kruger National Park.

Discovered in 1990, buffalo bovine tuberculosis is an airborne bacterial disease. Infected buffalo may carry the disease for long periods, becoming emaciated and eventually succumbing to predation. Tuberculosis has had a devastating effect on wild buffalo herds, crossing the species barrier and widely contaminating predators, scavengers and herbivores, such as lion, leopard, cheetah, baboon, kudu, eland, bongo, oryx, sable antelope and waterbuck. Bovine tuberculosis, first reported in South Africa in 1880 in domestic cattle and in 1928 in wildlife in the Eastern Cape, probably arrived with European settlers and their livestock.

The South African National Parks Board felt the only practical solution to the epidemic was to breed disease-free buffalo. Hunt sourced his first buffalo breeding stock from the gene pool of the Kruger Park and developed systems that have been acclaimed in wildlife management circles.

== See also ==
- Mutual of Omaha's Wild Kingdom episode "Buffalo Warrior"
