= Bloukrans River =

Bloukrans River may refer to any of the following rivers in South Africa:

- Bloukrans River (Garden Route), which forms the border between the Western Cape and the Eastern Cape, near Plettenberg Bay
- Bloukrans River (Grahamstown), tributary of the Kowie River, near Grahamstown in the Eastern Cape
- Bloukrans River (KwaZulu-Natal), tributary of the Tugela River, near Frere in KwaZulu-Natal

== See also ==
- Bloukrans Pass (disambiguation)
