= Tsitsikamma National Park =

Protected area on the Garden Route, Western Cape and Eastern Cape, South Africa

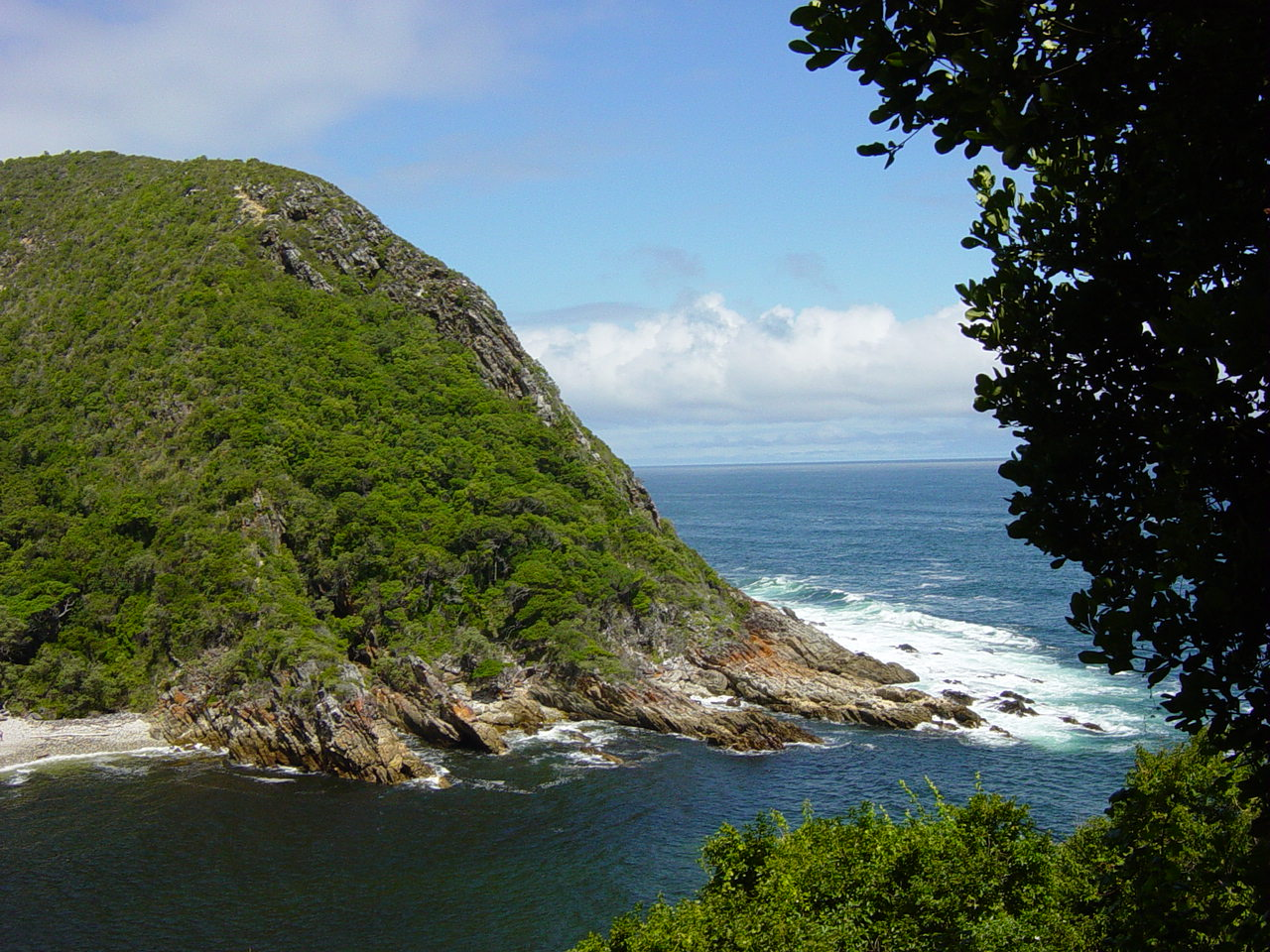
- Storms River mouth in the Tsitsikamma National Park

- Location within South Africa
- Location: Western Cape and Eastern Cape, South Africa
- Nearest city: Knysna
- Coordinates: 34°01′S 23°53′E
- Established: 2009

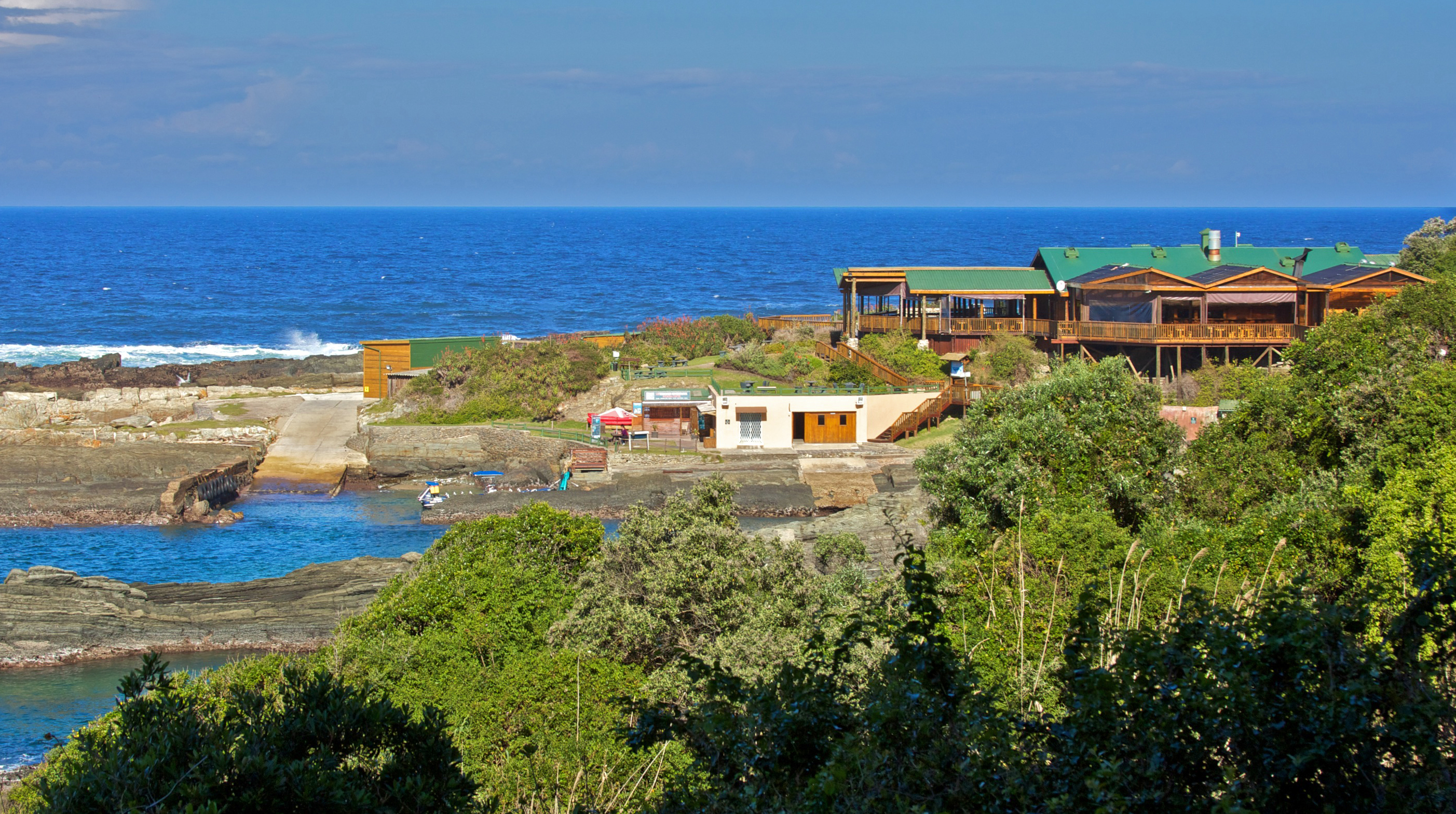
Storms River mouth

The Tsitsikamma National Park is a protected area on the Garden Route, Western Cape and Eastern Cape, South Africa. It is a coastal reserve well known for its indigenous forests, dramatic coastline, and the Otter Trail. On 6 March 2009 it was amalgamated with the Wilderness National Park and various other areas of land to form the Garden Route National Park.

The park covers an 80 kilometres (50 miles) long stretch of coastline. Nature's Valley is at the western end of the park, and the main accommodation is at Storms River Mouth. Near the park is the Bloukrans Bridge, the world's highest bridge bungee jump at 216 metres (709 ft).

The word "Tsitsikamma" originates from the Khoekhoe language tjisi, meaning "ten", and ǁamma, meaning "water", referring to the Tsitsikamma River. Other meanings are 'place of much water' and 'waters begin'.

== Camps ==
=== Storms River ===
Various amenities, including a restaurant, shop, chalets, campsite and caravan park, information centre, adventure bookings office, the Agulhas lookout platform, trees marked with their national tree list numbers, and underwater trails. The restaurant was destroyed by fire in November 2016.

=== Nature's Valley Rest Camp ===
This camp is situated in De Vasselot on the banks of the Groot River, about 30 km from Plettenberg Bay and about 40 km from Storms River Rest Camp. It is an ideal region for bird watchers and has a variety of trails for hikers.

== Trails ==
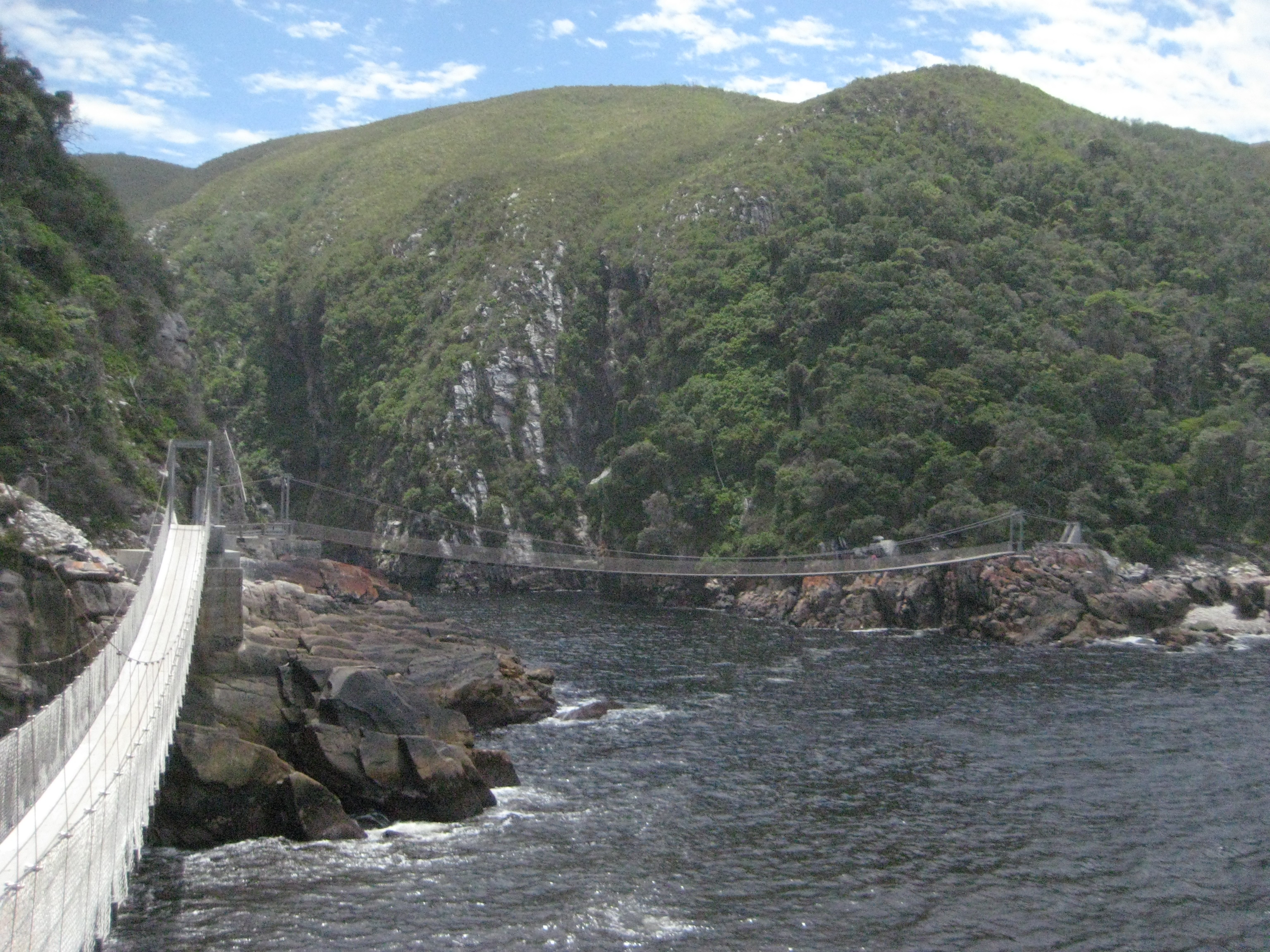
Suspension footbridge at Storms River

The Otter Trail starts at the Storms River camp and the South African National Parks has laid out several short trails for day visitors. Set in the Garden Route, the trails lead through coastal and forest scenes, as well as various waterfalls, streams, and rivers.

l. The Suspension Bridge and Lookout Trail is an easy stroll that leads along the western side of the river mouth, past the Strandloper Cave to the suspension bridge across the mouth. On the other side of the bridge, there is a short but very steep climb to a lookout point from which there are fine views of the mouth and the camp.

2. The Waterfall Trail is a short but demanding hike that follows the first 2.65 kilometres (1.65 miles) of the Otter Trail; hikers may not walk beyond the waterfall unless hiking the Otter Trail.

3. The Blue Duiker Trail starts just west of the information centre and leads through the scrub forest tip to the Agulhas lookout from where whales and dolphins can often be spotted in winter. After crossing a short section of fynbos, the trail takes hikers into the dry forest with some fine Sickle-leaved Yellowwoods evident.

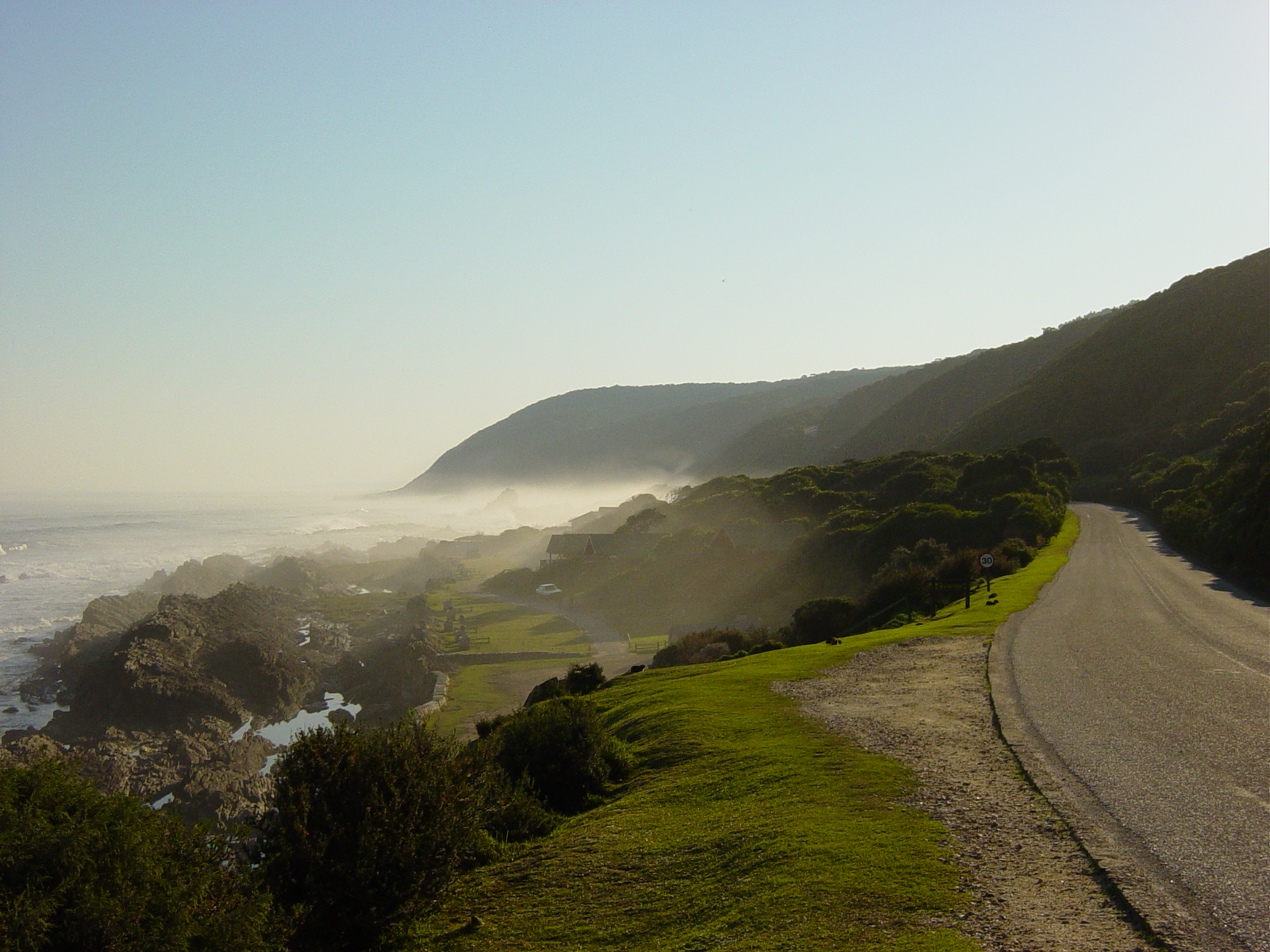
View of the park's shores

The Blue Duiker Trail continues through the forest, crossing a stream below a delightful waterfall. Several more streams and a cavernous tree bole mark the route. After crossing the road to the camp, the path drops to the coast just west of the start of the Waterfall/Otter trails and returns past the campsite and chalets. Birdlife unique to the forest is found west of the road, which makes this trail a favorite with birdwatchers.

4. The Lourie Trail is a shortcut to the Blue Duiker Trail, marked with a yellow sign. This trail passes next to a waterfall and has gorgeous views over the marine reserve. During the whaling period, and if the sea is calm, whales can often be seen from the top of the cliffs.

== Tsitsikamma Marine Protected Area ==
The Tsitsikamma Marine Protected Area is situated along the shoreline of the park, and provides protection for marine habitat and wildlife, including birds and threatened and endangered fish species. It is one of the largest and oldest restricted (no-take) MPAs in the world.

The location is in near pristine condition and is thus a suitable area for research on endangered fish species. It was designated as a Marine Protected Area in 1964.

The length of the protected shoreline is 60 km, and the area of protected ocean is 186 km^{2}.

The MPA is also managed by SANParks.

== See also ==
- Garden Route National Park – Coastal national park in South Africa
- Storms River – River in the Eastern Cape, South Africa
- Tsitsikamma Mountains – Mountain range in Western Cape, South Africa
- Tsitsikamma River – River in the Eastern Cape, South Africa
- Knysna-Tsitsikamma Forest vegetation – Ecoregion of the tropical and subtropical moist broadleaf forests biome in South Africa
