= Grassland National Park =

South African national park in the Eastern Cape

- IUCN category II (national park)
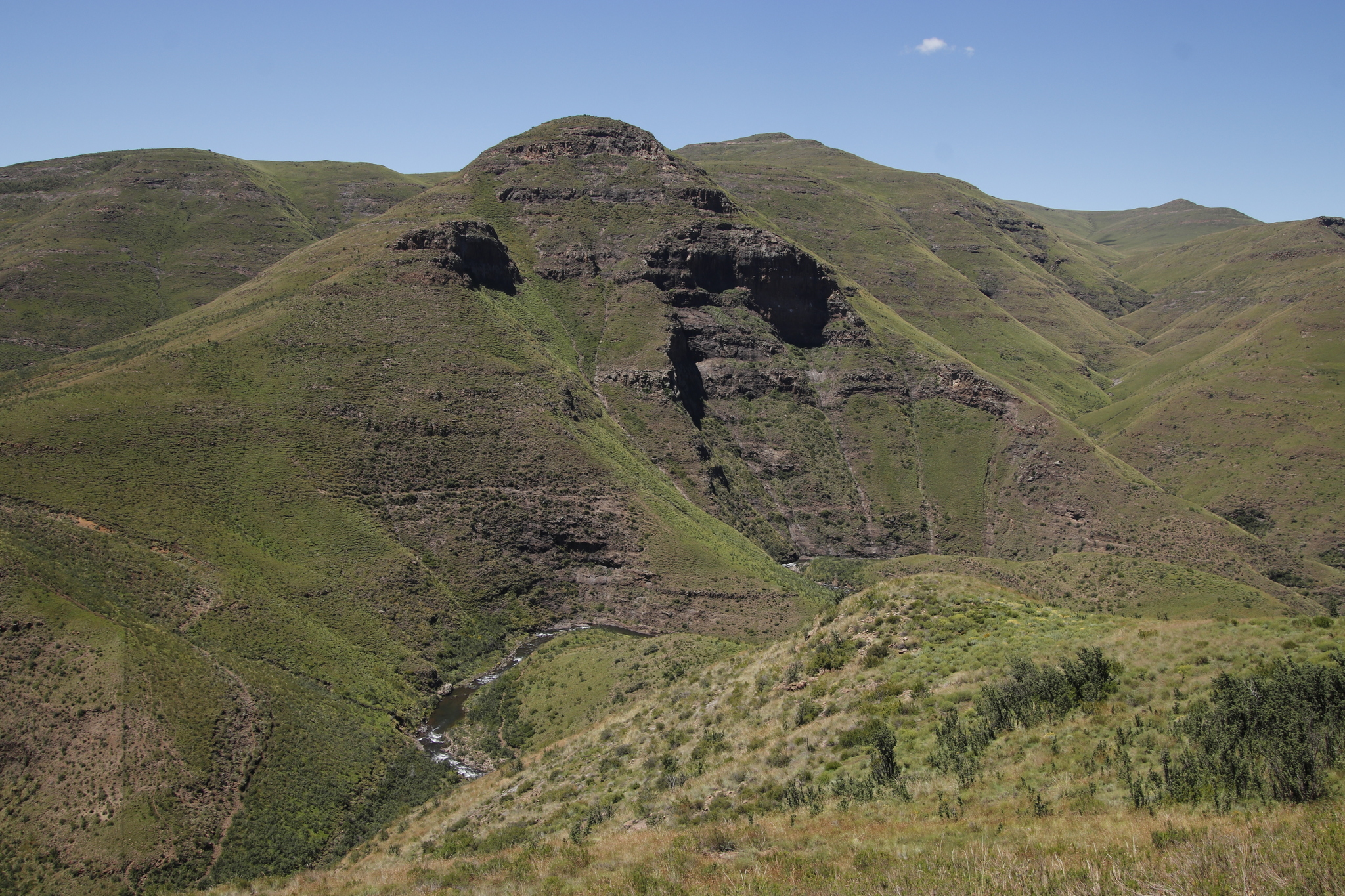

- Location within South Africa Location within Eastern Cape
- Interactive map of Grassland National Park
- Location: Eastern Cape
- Nearest city: Lady Grey (west); Elliot (south)
- Coordinates: 30.7637°S 28.1044°E
- Area: 102.25 km^{2} (39.48 sq mi)
- Established: 17 October 2025; 10 months ago
- Governing body: South African National Parks and World Wide Fund for Nature South Africa

Grassland National Park in the Eastern Cape Highlands of South Africa is located along the Witteberge mountain range. It lies on the south-western border of South Africa and Lesotho.

== History ==
In 2025, the park was established through a partnership between SANParks and the World Wildlife Fund (WWF-SA) to protect under-protected grassveld vegetation.

=== Conservation model ===
The long-term goal is to incorporate private and communal landownership with voluntary stewardship agreements, increasing the current 10 000 hectares of private protected land to 30 000 hectares.

== See also ==
- Protected areas of South Africa
