= Bloukrans River (Garden Route) =

River in South Africa

Coordinates: 33°53′01″S 23°40′21″E

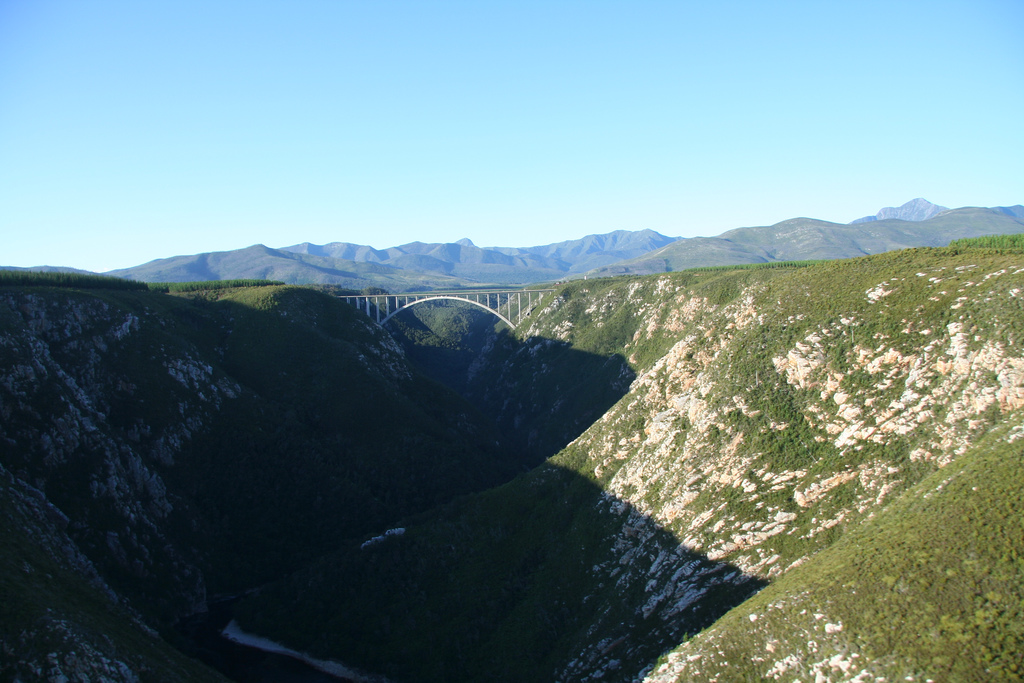
The Bloukrans Bridge

The Bloukrans River is a short river located in the Tsitsikamma region of the Garden Route, South Africa. It is located on the border between the Western Cape and Eastern Cape provinces. The river mouth is located east of Nature's Valley, the Bloukrans Bridge spans the river near the mouth and the Bloukrans Pass is close by. The river originates near Peak Formosa in the Plettenberg Bay region.

The Bloukrans Bridge spanning the river is home to the world's highest commercial bungee jump, the Bloukrans Bridge Bungy operated by Face Adrenalin, at 233 m.

== See also ==
- List of rivers of South Africa
- Bloukrans Bridge Bungy
