= Wilderness National Park =

National park around the seaside town of Wilderness, Western Cape, South Africa

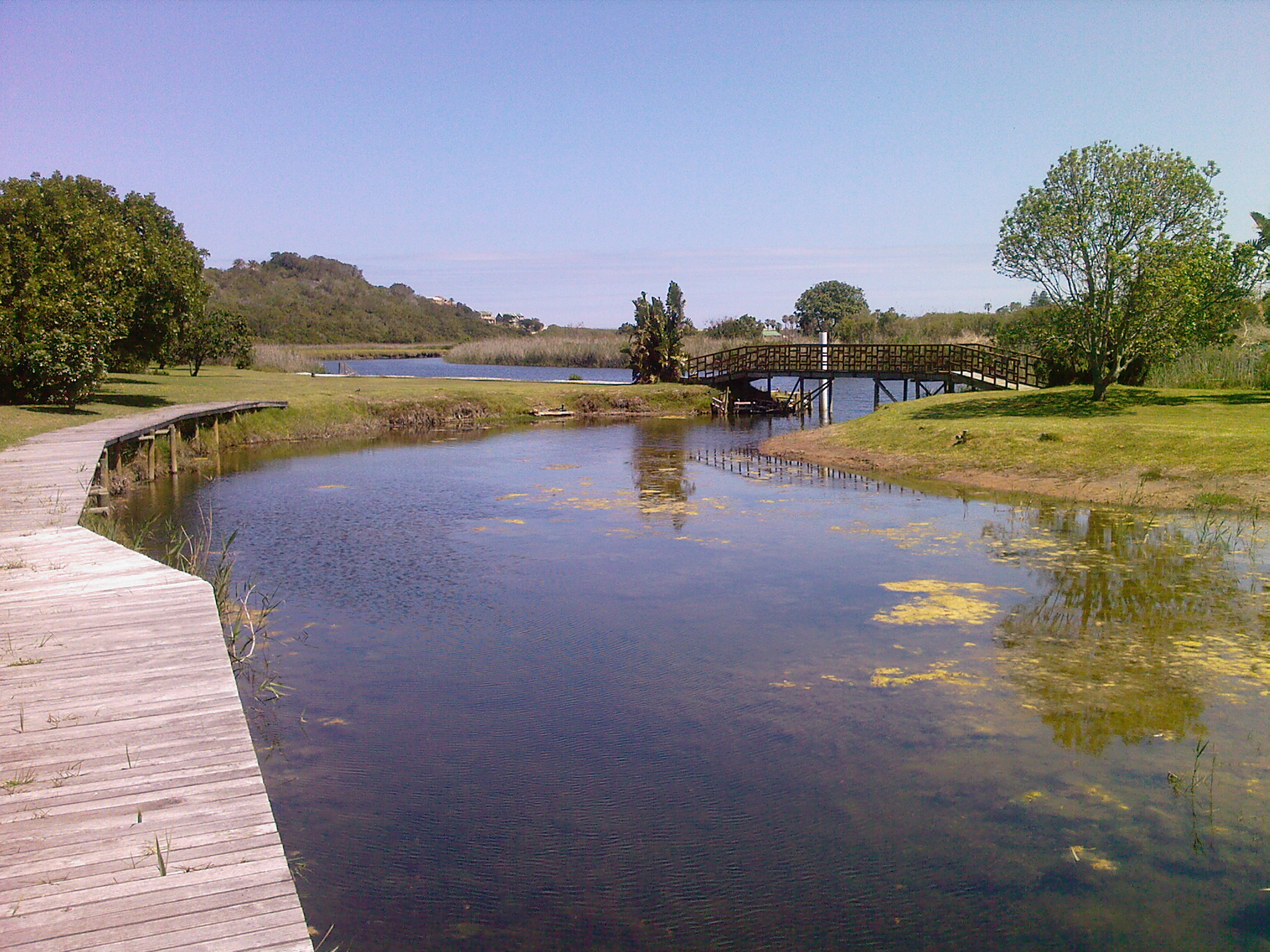
- Rest camp situated within the Wilderness National Park

- Location within South Africa
- Location: Western Cape, South Africa
- Nearest city: George
- Coordinates: 34°0′S 23°15′E
- Area: 1,210 km^{2} (470 sq mi)
- Established: 6 March 2009
- Governing body: South African National Parks
- Website: www.sanparks.org/parks/garden_route/

Wilderness National Park, also called the Wilderness Section, is located around the seaside town of Wilderness between the larger towns of George and Knysna, in the Western Cape. It is a protected area of South Africa forming part of the Garden Route National Park.

== Description ==
This natural area stretches from the Touws River mouth to the Eilandvlei estuary and linking into the Swartvlei lake, where it neighbours with the Goukamma Nature Reserve. The wildlife in this natural area is varied, and includes the Knysna seahorse, pansy shell, pied kingfisher, Knysna lourie, grey heron, and little egret.

This park protects three major zones of indigenous forest, four types of fynbos (wild shrubs), plus various lakes and winding waterways. There are also a number of interesting historical sites include the Woodville Big Tree (believed to be over 800 years old) and Goudveld (an old mining town in the forest).

The Touws River connects a series of three lakes: Eilandvlei, Langvlei and Rondevlei, which host a variety of aquatic species and have been designated as a Ramsar site (wetlands of international importance). Sports within the park include canoeing or bicycling, abseiling, kloofing, paragliding, boating, fishing and hiking.

== History ==
In 1968, the protection of the lakes in the Wilderness area was started through the identification of 450 hectares around the river mouth, including the two lakes as well as the Duiwerivier Kloof. The Wilderness National Park itself was proclaimed in 1987, after being under the control of the Lake Areas Development Board until 1985, whereafter the National Parks Board took over.

In 2008, the Wilderness National Park joined the Garden Route National Park.

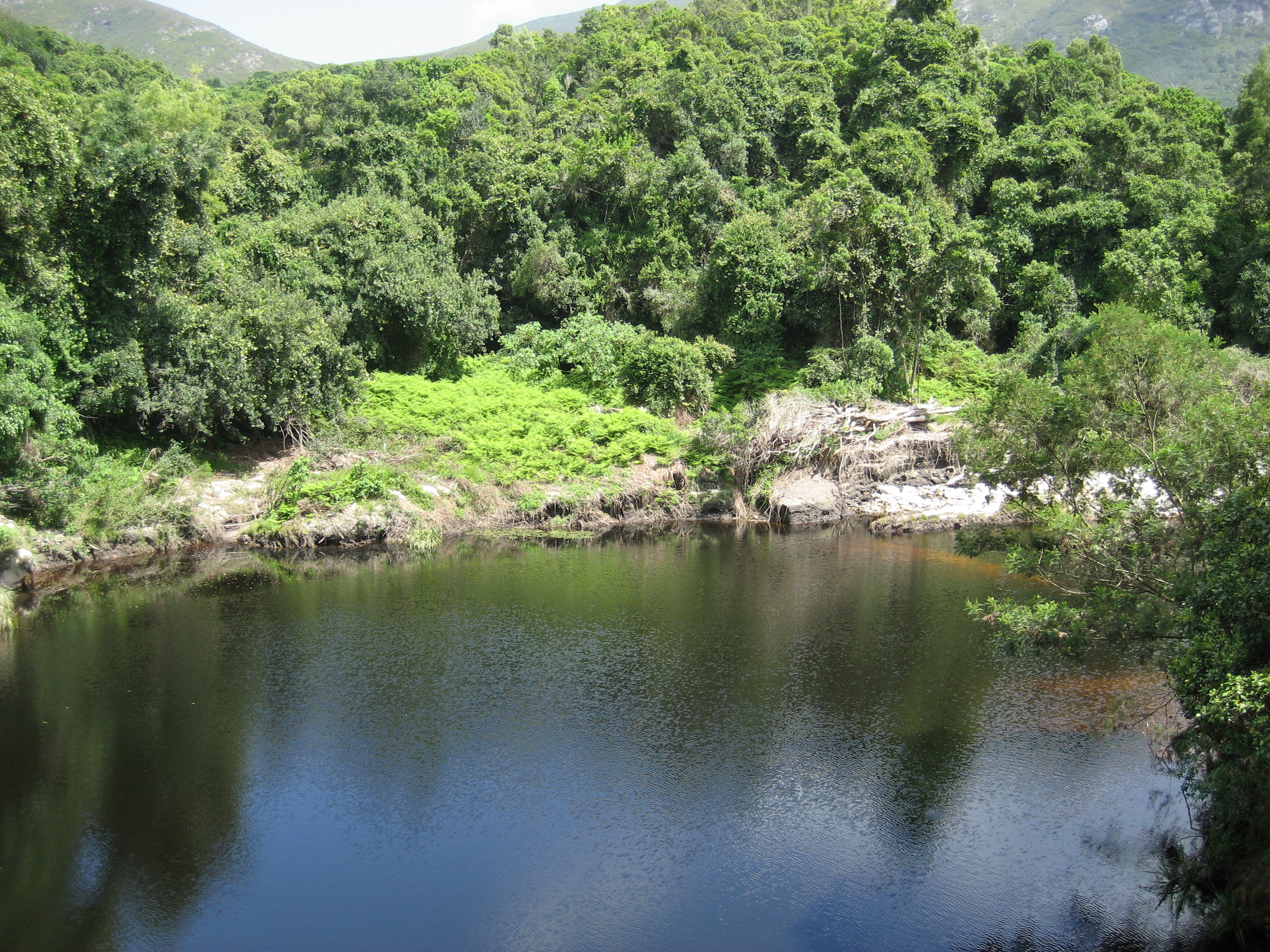
Landscape scenery in the park
