= Goukamma Marine Protected Area =

Marine conservation area the Western Cape in South Africa

- Goukamma MPA location
- Location: Western Cape province, South Africa
- Nearest city: Knysna
- Coordinates: 34°04′S 22°54′E
- Area: 32 km^{2} (12 sq mi)
- Established: 2000
- World Heritage site: yes
- Goukamma Marine Protected Area (South Africa)

The Goukamma Marine Protected Area is an inshore conservation region near Knysna in the Western Cape province in the territorial waters of South Africa

== History ==
The Goukamma MPA was originally proclaimed a Marine Protected Area in 1990. The MPA was proclaimed by the Minister of Environmental Affairs and Tourism, Mohammed Valli Moosa, in Government Gazette No. 21948 of 29 December 2000 in terms section 43 of the Marine Living Resources Act, 18 of 1998.

== Purpose ==
A marine protected area is defined by the IUCN as "A clearly defined geographical space, recognised, dedicated and managed, through legal or other effective means, to achieve the long-term conservation of nature with associated ecosystem services and cultural values".

The Goukamma MPA was established to achieve a multi-pronged approach to conservation. This includes protecting the marine and coastal ecosystems, along with the rich biodiversity they hold, within the Goukamma area. The MPA also plays a vital role in safeguarding the reproductive capacity of commercially fished species. This allows their populations to recover and, in turn, replenish fish stocks in nearby areas.

The MPA helps preserve the Goukamma estuary's crucial role as a nursery for fish that rely on estuaries during specific stages of their life cycle.

The MPA restricts or prohibits activities that could have a detrimental impact on the coastal and ocean environment. This includes protecting the estuary and specific fish populations, such as dusky kob, white steenbras, red roman, and galjoen.

== Extent ==
The MPA is about 10 kilometers west of Knysna in the Western Cape, with a protected coastline of approximately 16 km from Buffels Bay to Platbank and extends one nautical mile into the sea. The area of ocean protected is approximately 32 km^{2}. The Goukamma Estuary is a temporarily closed rivermouth in the MPA.

=== Boundaries ===
The original MPA was bounded by:

- Northern boundary: The high-water mark between Platbank at S34°2.767′ E22°50.133′ and Buffels Bay at S34°4.717′ E22°58.667′
- Southern boundary: A line one nautical mile to seaward of the high-water mark
- Eastern boundary: A line at 090° true bearing from where the north-eastern boundary of Portion 1 of the farm Walker's Point reaches the high-water mark at S34°4.717′ E22°58.667′.
- Western boundary: A line at 180° true bearing from where the western boundary of the Goukamma Nature Reserve reaches the high-water mark at S34°2.767′ E22°50.133′.

The revised MPA is bounded by:

- Eastern boundary: S34°04.440', E22°59.227' at Buffels Bay to S34°6.100', E22°59.227'
- Southern boundary: S34°6.100', E22°59.227' to S34°6.100', E22°50.136'
- Western boundary: S34°6.100', E22°50.136' to S34°2.781' E22°50.136' at Platbank
- Northern boundary: S34°2.781' E22°50.136' at Platbank to S34°04.440', E22°59.227' at Buffels Bay along the high water mark
- The Goukamma Estuary from the mouth to a point upstream at S34°0.490', E22°56.230'.

== Management ==
The marine protected areas of South Africa are the responsibility of the national government, which has management agreements with a variety of MPA management authorities, in this case, the Goukamma MPA is managed by CapeNature, with funding from the SA Government through the Department of Environmental Affairs (DEA).

The Department of Agriculture, Forestry and Fisheries is responsible for issuing permits, quotas and law enforcement.

== Use ==
Recreational activities in Buffalo Bay include kayaking, kite surfing, snorkelling, shore angling, and surfing.

== Ecology ==
Marine ecoregions of the South African Exclusive Economic Zone: Goukamma Marine Protected Area is in the Agulhas ecoregion

The MPA is in the warm temperate Agulhas ecoregion to the east of Cape Point which extends eastwards to the Mbashe River. There are a large proportion of species endemic to South Africa along this coastline.

(check below for applicability) Four major habitats exist in the sea in this region, distinguished by the nature of the substrate. The substrate, or base material, is important in that it provides a base to which an organism can anchor itself, which is vitally important for those organisms which need to stay in one particular kind of place. Rocky shores and reefs provide a firm fixed substrate for the attachment of plants and animals. Some of these may have Kelp forests, which reduce the effect of waves and provide food and shelter for an extended range of organisms. Sandy beaches and bottoms are a relatively unstable substrate and cannot anchor kelp or many of the other benthic organisms. Finally there is open water, above the substrate and clear of the kelp forest, where the organisms must drift or swim. Mixed habitats are also frequently found, which are a combination of those mentioned above. There are no significant estuarine habitats in the MPA.

Rocky shores and reefs There are rocky reefs and mixed rocky and sandy bottoms. For many marine organisms the substrate is another type of marine organism, and it is common for several layers to co-exist. Examples of this are red bait pods, which are usually encrusted with sponges, ascidians, bryozoans, anemones, and gastropods, and abalone, which are usually covered by similar seaweeds to those found on the surrounding rocks, usually with a variety of other organisms living on the seaweeds.

The type of rock of the reef is of some importance, as it influences the range of possibilities for the local topography, which in turn influences the range of habitats provided, and therefore the diversity of inhabitants. Sandstone and other sedimentary rocks erode and weather very differently, and depending on the direction of dip and strike, and steepness of the dip, may produce reefs which are relatively flat to very high profile and full of small crevices. These features may be at varying angles to the shoreline and wave fronts. There are fewer large holes, tunnels and crevices in sandstone reefs, but often many deep but low near-horizontal crevices.

Sandy beaches and bottoms (including shelly, pebble and gravel bottoms) Sandy bottoms at first glance appear to be fairly barren areas, as they lack the stability to support many of the spectacular reef based species, and the variety of large organisms is relatively low. The sand is continually being moved around by wave action, to a greater or lesser degree depending on weather conditions and exposure of the area. This means that sessile organisms must be specifically adapted to areas of relatively loose substrate to thrive in them, and the variety of species found on a sandy or gravel bottom will depend on all these factors. Sandy bottoms have one important compensation for their instability, animals can burrow into the sand and move up and down within its layers, which can provide feeding opportunities and protection from predation. Other species can dig themselves holes in which to shelter, or may feed by filtering water drawn through the tunnel, or by extending body parts adapted to this function into the water above the sand.

The open sea The pelagic water column is the major part of the living space at sea. This is the water between the surface and the top of the benthic zone, where living organisms swim, float or drift, and the food chain starts with phytoplankton, the mostly microscopic photosynthetic organisms that convert the energy of sunlight into organic material which feeds nearly everything else, directly or indirectly. In temperate seas there are distinct seasonal cycles of phytoplankton growth, based on the available nutrients and the available sunlight. Either can be a limiting factor. Phytoplankton tend to thrive where there is plenty of light, and they themselves are a major factor in restricting light penetration to greater depths, so the photosynthetic zone tends to be shallower in areas of high productivity. Zooplankton feed on the phytoplankton, and are in turn eaten by larger animals. The larger pelagic animals are generally faster moving and more mobile, giving them the option of changing depth to feed or to avoid predation, and to move to other places in search of a better food supply.

=== Marine species diversity ===
==== Animals ====
Marine mammals:

- Eubalaena australis (Southern right whale)
- Sousa plumbea (Indo-Pacific humpbacked dolphin)
- Tursiops truncatus (Bottlenose dolphin)

Marine reptiles:

- Caretta caretta (Loggerhead turtle)
- Chelonia mydas (Green turtle)
- Eretmochelys imbricata (Hawksbill turtle)
- Dermochelys coriacea (Leatherback turtle)

Birds:

- Haematopus moquini (African oystercatcher)
- Charadrius marginatus (White-fronted plover)

Fish:

- Argyrosomus japonicus (dusky kob)
- Atractoscion aequidens (geelbek)
- Chrysoblephus laticeps (roman seabream)
- Dichistius capensis (galjoen)
- Lithognathus lithognathus (white steenbras)
- Merluccius capensis (hake)
- Petrus rupestris (red steenbras)
- Pomadasys commersonii (spotted grunter)

==== Endemism ====
The MPA is in the warm temperate Agulhas ecoregion to the east of Cape Point which extends eastwards to the Mbashe River. There are a large proportion of species endemic to South Africa along this coastline. The Goukamma MPA is home to many species that are endemic to South Africa's south coast.

== See also ==
Marine protected areas of South Africa

- List of protected areas of South Africa
- Marine protected areas of South Africa – Protected areas of coastline or ocean in the EEZ of South Africa
