= South African National Parks =

Body responsible for managing South Africa's national parks

Agency overview
- Formed: 1926; 100 years ago
- Jurisdiction: South Africa
- Headquarters: 643 Leyds Street, Muckleneuk, Pretoria, Gauteng, South Africa; 25°45′59″S 28°12′8″E
- Employees: 4,027 (permanent); 1,405 (temporary)
- Annual budget: R2.046 billion
- Minister responsible: David Maynier, Minister of Forestry, Fisheries and the Environment
- Agency executives: Beryl Ferguson, Interim Board Chairperson; Hapiloe Sello, CEO
- Parent department: Department of Forestry, Fisheries and the Environment
- Key documents: National Parks Act, 1976; National Environmental Management: Protected Areas Act, 2003
- Website: www.sanparks.org

Map
- SANParks management areas - Interactive Map National Park Marine Protected Area

South African National Parks (SANParks) is the body responsible for managing South Africa's national parks. SANParks was formed in 1926, and currently manages 21 national parks and 10 marine protected areas, totalling over 44,595 km^{2} (17,218 sq mi). (Note: Groenkloof and Graspan/Vaalbos are declared national parks in legislation but are not operationally functional national parks.)

Many parks offer a variety of accommodations. The best-known park is Kruger National Park, which is also the oldest (proclaimed in 1898), and the largest, at nearly 20,000 km^{2} (7,700 sq mi). Kruger National Park and Table Mountain National Park are two of South Africa's most visited tourist attractions.

Though not designated as National Parks, other protected areas exist, such as game and nature reserves.

== List of parks administered by SANParks ==
The following are designated as National Parks of South Africa:

Name	Photo	Location	Date established	Area
Addo Elephant National Park		Eastern Cape; 33.26°S 25.44°E	1931	1,642 km^{2} (634 sq mi)
Agulhas National Park		Western Cape; 34.50°S 20.00°E	14 Sep 1998	56.9 km^{2} (22.0 sq mi)
Ai-Ais/Richtersveld Transfrontier Park Richtersveld National Park (South Africa) Ai-Ais Hot Springs (Namibia)		Northern Cape; 28.053889°S 17.034722°E	2003; 1991; 1968	5,920 km^{2} (2,290 sq mi); 1,624 km^{2} (627 sq mi); 4,611 km^{2} (1,780 sq mi)
Augrabies Falls National Park		Northern Cape; 28.591111°S 20.338333°E	1966	417 km^{2} (161 sq mi)
Bontebok National Park		Western Cape; 34.066667°S 20.45°E	1931	27.9 km^{2} (10.8 sq mi)
Camdeboo National Park		Eastern Cape; 32.25°S 24.5°E	30 Oct 2005; 1979 (Karoo Nature Reserve)	194 km^{2} (75 sq mi)
Garden Route National Park		Western Cape; 34°S 23.25°E	6 Mar 2009; 1985 (Knysna National Lake Area); 1964 (Tsitsikamma National Park); 1985 (Wilderness National Park)	1,210 km^{2} (470 sq mi) (150 km^{2} (58 sq mi)) (639 km^{2} (247 sq mi)) (106 km^{2} (41 sq mi))
Golden Gate Highlands National Park		Free State; 28.506111°S 28.616667°E	1963	116 km^{2} (45 sq mi)
Grassland National Park		Eastern Cape; 30.7637°S 28.1044°E	17 Oct 2025	102.25 km^{2} (39.48 sq mi) 300 km^{2} (120 sq mi) - planned
Karoo National Park		Western Cape; 32.35°S 22.583333°E	1979	831 km^{2} (321 sq mi)
Kgalagadi Transfrontier Park Kalahari Gemsbok National Park (South Africa) Gemsbok National Park (Botswana)		Northern Cape; 26.47716141014315°S 20.61268169075392°E	12 May 2000; 31 Jul 1931 (unknown)	33,551 km^{2} (12,954 sq mi); 9,591 km^{2} (3,703 sq mi); 28,000 km^{2} (11,000 sq mi)(est.)
Kruger National Park		Limpopo and Mpumalanga; 24.011389°S 31.485278°E	31 May 1926	19,623 km^{2} (7,576 sq mi)
Mapungubwe National Park		Limpopo; 22.2°S 29.4°E	1995	53.6 km^{2} (20.7 sq mi)
Marakele National Park		Limpopo; 24.4°S 27.6°E	11 February 1994	507 km^{2} (196 sq mi)
Meerkat National Park		Northern Cape; 30.691444°S 21.39°E	27 March 2020	1,352.45 km^{2} (522.18 sq mi)
Mokala National Park		Northern Cape; 29.166667°S 24.35°E	19 June 2007	196 km^{2} (76 sq mi)
Mountain Zebra National Park		Eastern Cape; 32.183333°S 25.616667°E	1937	284 km^{2} (110 sq mi)
Namaqua National Park		Northern Cape; 30.043333°S 17.586111°E	1999	1,350 km^{2} (520 sq mi)
Table Mountain National Park		Western Cape; 33.966667°S 18.425°E	19 May 1998	243 km^{2} (94 sq mi)
Tankwa Karoo National Park		Northern Cape; 32.25°S 19.75°E	19 May 1986	1,216 km^{2} (470 sq mi)
West Coast National Park		Western Cape; 33.120833°S 18.066667°E	1985	363 km^{2} (140 sq mi)

=== Location of national parks ===
South African National Parks

== See also ==
- Protected areas of South Africa
- Ezemvelo KZN Wildlife – The body responsible for maintaining wilderness areas and public nature reserves in KwaZulu-Natal
- Eastern Cape Parks – The body responsible for maintaining wilderness areas and public nature reserves in the Eastern Cape
- Gauteng Department of Agriculture, Conservation, Environment and Land Affairs – The government department responsible for maintaining wilderness areas and public nature reserves in Gauteng.
- Mpumalanga Parks Board – The body responsible for maintaining wilderness areas and public nature reserves in Mpumalanga
- North West Parks and Tourism Board – The body responsible for maintaining wilderness areas and public nature reserves in the North West
- Cape Nature – The body responsible for maintaining wilderness areas and public nature reserves in the Western Cape
