= Bloukrans Bridge =

Bridge on the N2 highway in South Africa

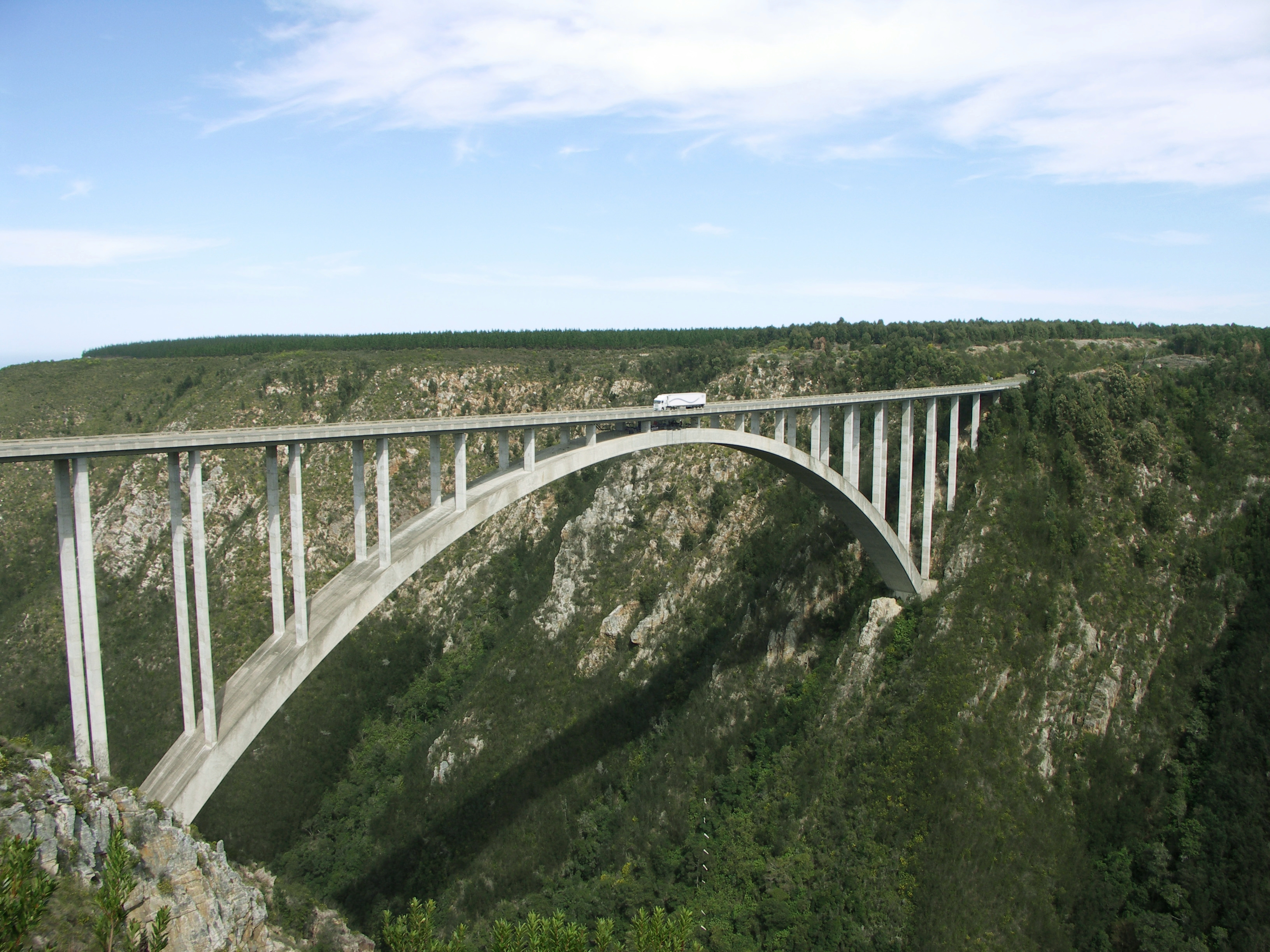
- Bloukrans Bridge from the north
- Coordinates: 33°58′02.17″S 23°38′42.62″E
- Carries: National Route 2
- Crosses: Bloukrans River
- Locale: Nature's Valley, Western Cape

Characteristics
- Design: Arch bridge
- Total length: 451m
- Height: 216m
- Longest span: 272m

History
- Construction cost: R25 million
- Opened: 10 June 1983

Location
- Interactive map of Bloukrans Bridge

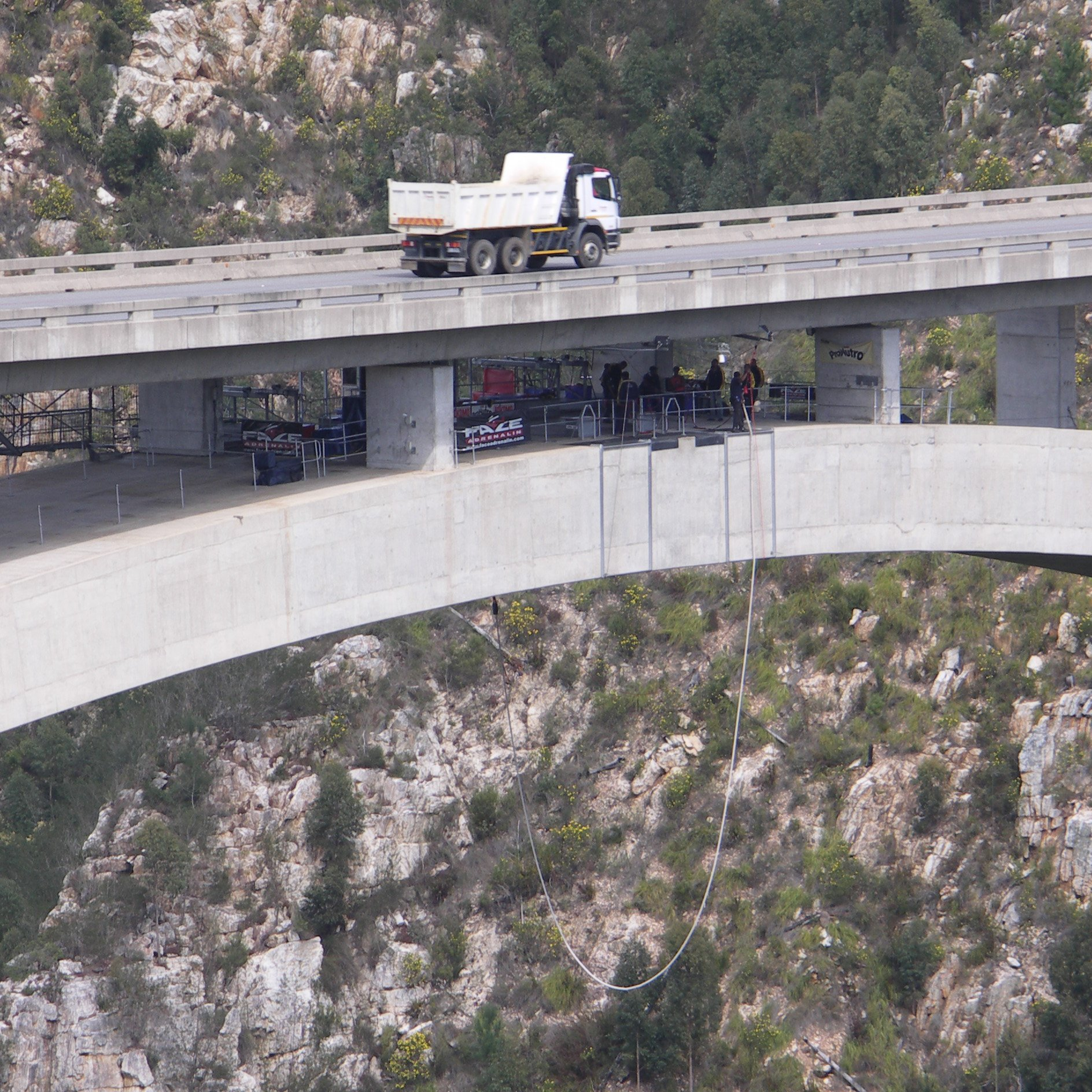
Bungee operations under the road deck of the bridge

The Bloukrans Bridge is an arch bridge located near Nature's Valley, Western Cape, South Africa. Designed by Liebenberg and Stander (Bergstan SA) and constructed by Concor between February 1980 and June 1983, the bridge is 216 m above the Bloukrans River. The central span is 272 m and the bridge is 451 m in length. Its primary use is carrying national route N2.

Bloukrans Bridge is the site of the world's highest commercial bridge bungee jumping, Bloukrans Bridge Bungy, operated by Face Adrenalin since 1997. The Bloukrans River below forms the border between the Eastern Cape and Western Cape provinces and is located in the Tsitsikamma region of the Garden Route.

== See also ==
- List of arch bridges by length
- List of highest bridges in the world
- Bloukrans Bridge Bungy
