= Storms River =

River in the Eastern Cape, South Africa

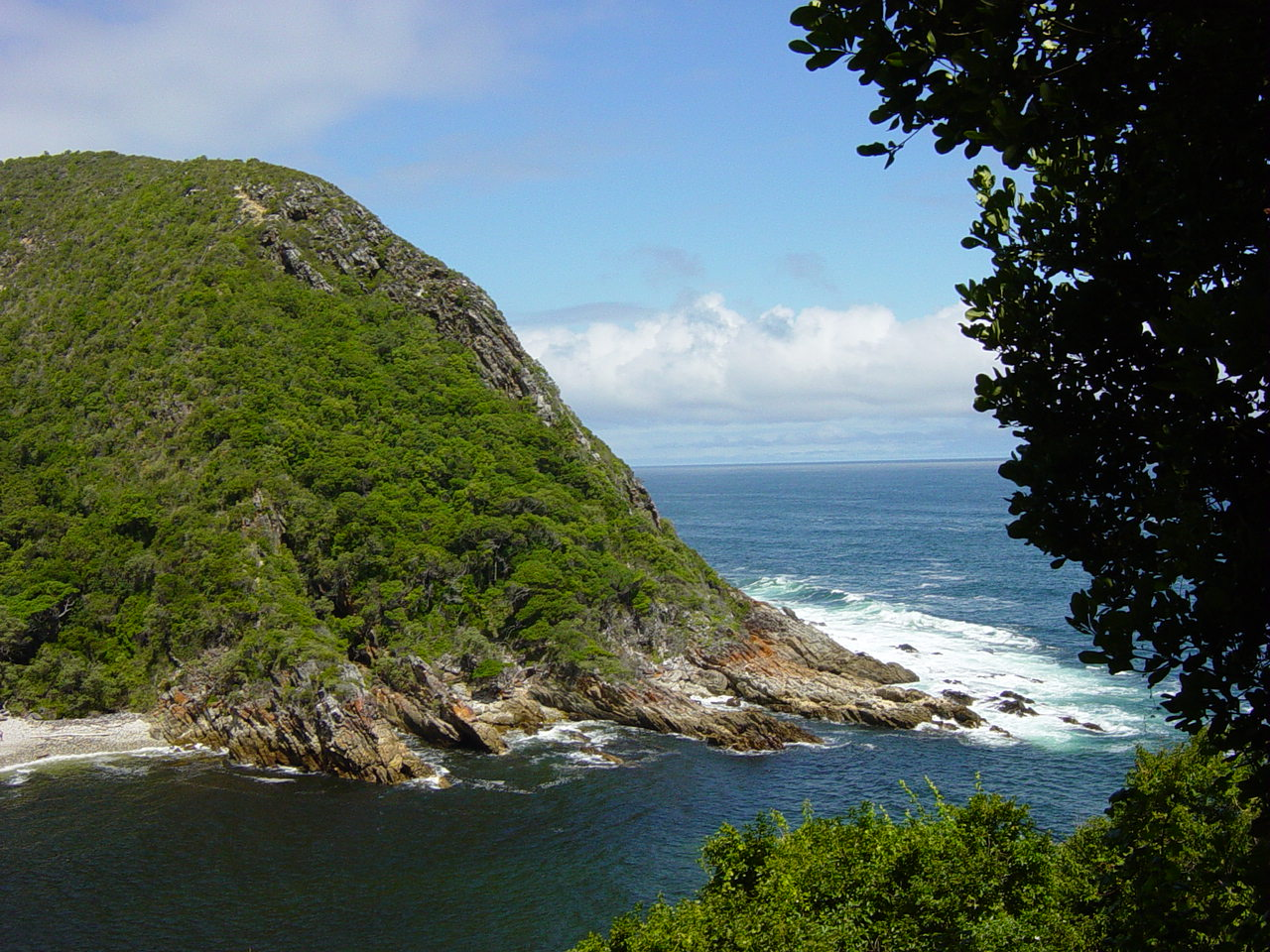
- Storms River mouth in Tsitsikamma National Park

- Location within South Africa

Location
- Country: South Africa
- Province: Eastern Cape
- Municipality: Kou-Kamma Local Municipality

Physical characteristics
- Source: _
- Mouth: Indian Ocean
  - location: Eastern Cape, South Africa
  - coordinates: 34°01′15″S 23°54′10″E
  - elevation: 0 m (0 ft)

Storms River (Afrikaans: Stormsrivier) is a river in the Eastern Cape province of South Africa. The river mouth is located in the Tsitsikamma National Park. The 5 day Otter Trail starts at the Storms River mouth.

== See also ==
- Tsitsikamma National Park
- Paul Sauer Bridge
- List of rivers of South Africa
