= Garden Route =

Coastal region in southern South Africa

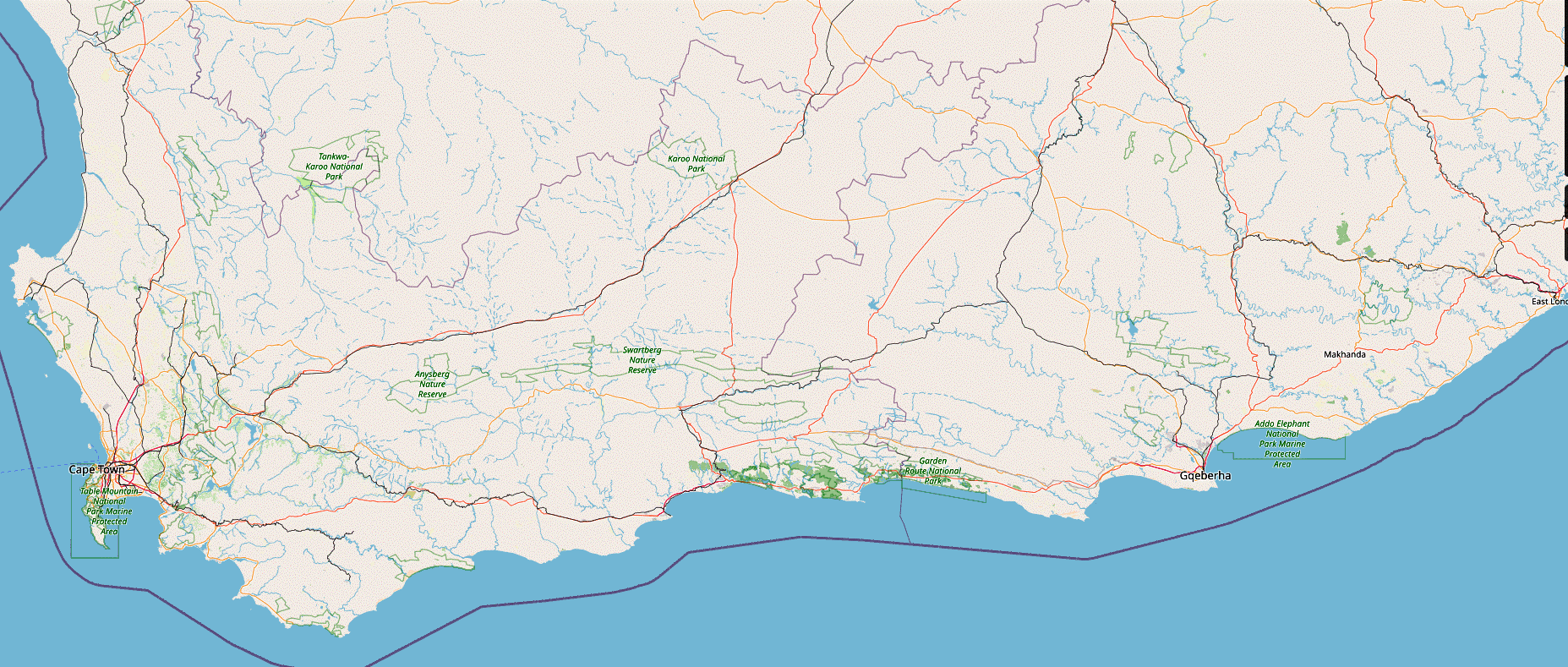
An overview of the Garden Route.

The Garden Route (Afrikaans: Tuinroete) is a 300-kilometre (190 mi) stretch of the south-eastern coast of South Africa which extends from Witsand in the Western Cape to the border of Tsitsikamma Storms River in the Eastern Cape. The name comes from the verdant and ecologically diverse vegetation encountered here and the numerous estuaries and lakes dotted along the coastline. It includes towns such as Witsand, Heidelberg, Riversdale, Stilbaai, Albertinia, Gouritsmond, Knysna, Plettenberg Bay, Mossel Bay, Oudtshoorn, Great Brak River, Little Brak River, Wilderness, Sedgefield and Nature's Valley. George is the Garden Route's largest city and main administrative centre.

The Garden Route is closely linked with the origin of human culture, due to archaeological finds in the Plettenberg Bay, Mossel Bay, and Stilbaai areas. The route was added to UNESCO's World Network of Biosphere Reserves in 2017.

== Climate and habitat ==
The route has an oceanic climate, with mild to warm summers, and mild to cool winters. Temperatures rarely fall below 10 °C in winter and seldom climb beyond 28 °C in summer. Rain occurs year-round, with a slight peak in the spring months, brought by humid sea winds from the Indian Ocean rising and releasing their precipitation along the Langeberg, Outeniqua, and Tsitsikamma Mountains just inland of the coast.

The route is sandwiched between these mountains and the Indian Ocean, with mountain passes, including the Outeniqua Pass and Garcia's Pass, linking the area with the arid Little Karoo. The Outeniqua, Grootvadersbosch, and Tsitsikamma indigenous forests are a unique mixture of Cape Fynbos and Temperate Forest and offer hiking trails and eco-tourism activities. Nearly 300 species of birdlife can be found in a variety of habitats ranging from fynbos to forest and wetlands.

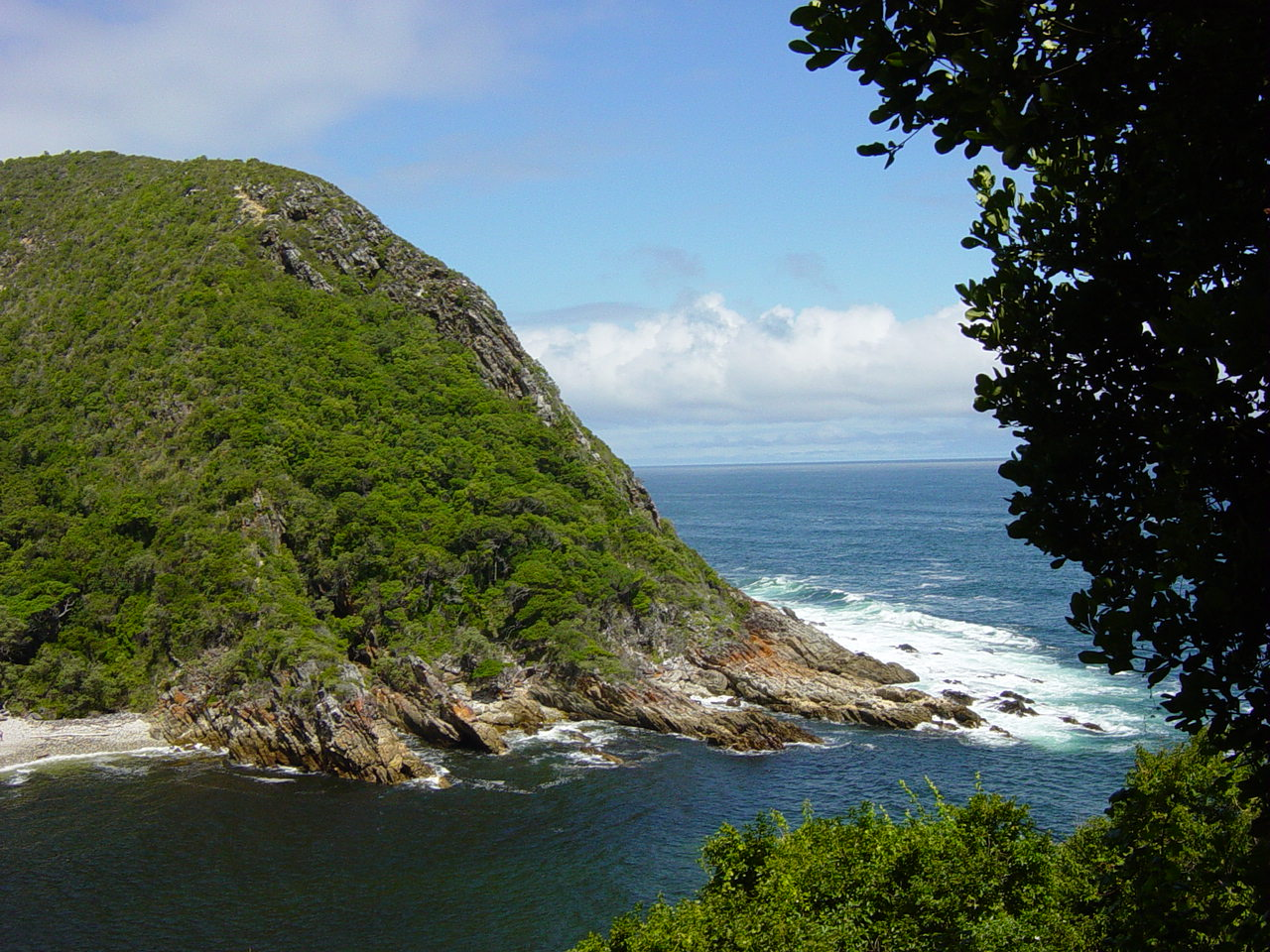
A river mouth in the Tsitsikamma National Park, situated on the Garden Route

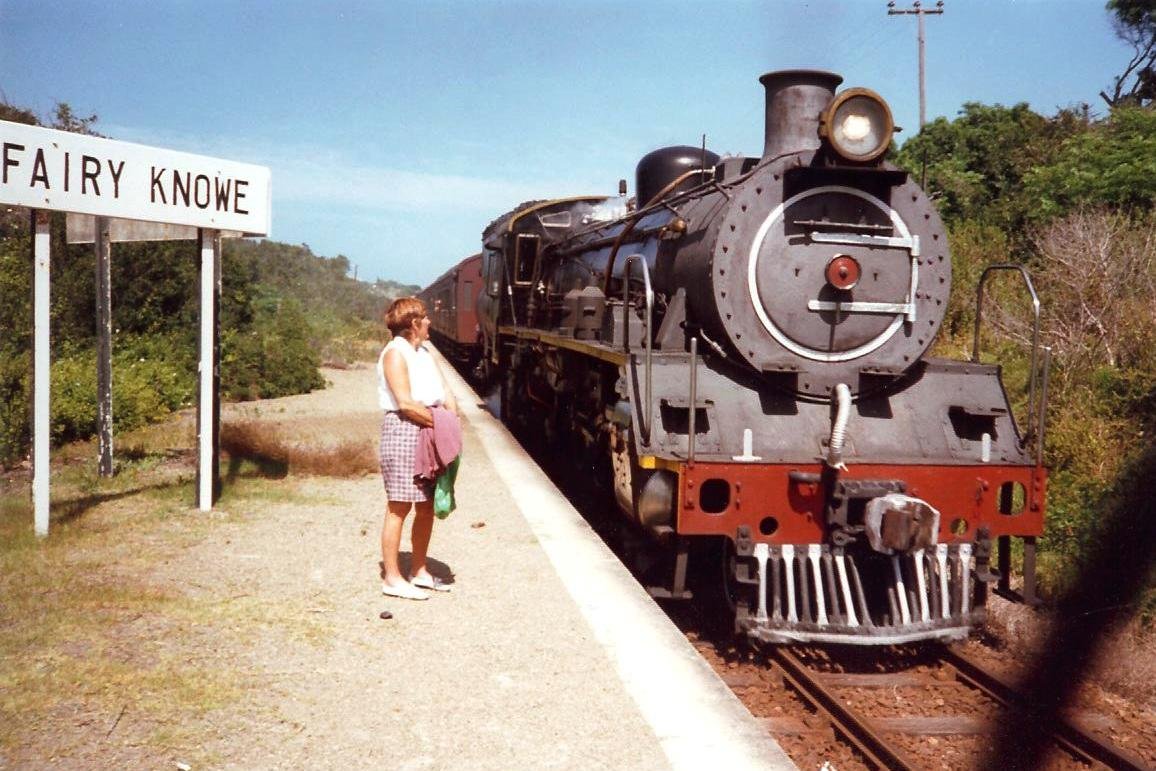
Fairy Knowe station, near Wilderness

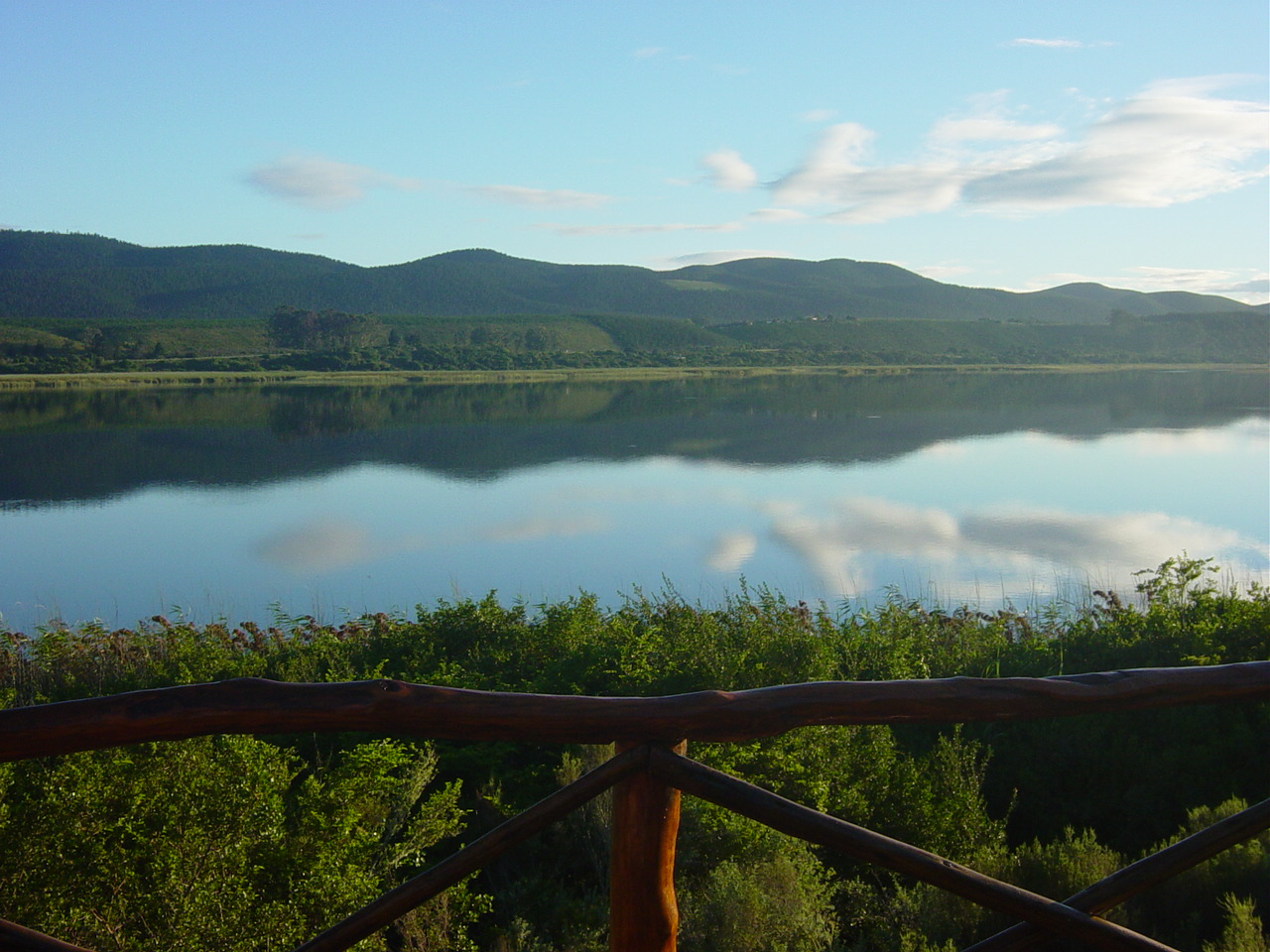
A tranquil scene at a lake on the Garden Route

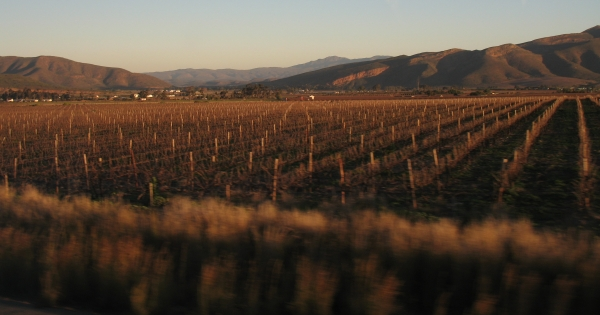
A vineyard on the Garden Route in winter

== See also ==
- George, Western Cape
- Knysna
- Plettenberg Bay
- Mossel Bay
- Oudtshoorn
- Bloukrans Bridge Bungy
- Tsitsikamma
- Riversdale
