= Protasiv Yar (disambiguation) =

Protasiv Yar is a historical neighbourhood in Kyiv, Ukraine.

Protasiv Yar may also refer to:

- Protasiv Yar railway station
- Protasiv Yar (ski complex)
