= Yurii Yevreinov =

Ukrainian artist

- Євреїнов Юрій Миколайович
- Born: October 18, 1932. Kyiv, Ukraine
- Died: May 5, 1990 (aged 57); Kyiv, Ukraine
- Education: National Academy of Visual Arts and Architecture
- Known for: artist, architect

Yurii Mykolaiovych Yevreinov (October 18, 1932, Kyiv – May 5, 1990, Kyiv) was a Ukrainian artist. In 1963, he became a member of the Union of Architects of Ukraine. Boryspil International Airport.

== Biography ==
Yurii Yevreinov was born on October 18, 1932 in Kyiv. In 1951, he graduated from the Shevchenko State Art School. He completed his studies in the architectural faculty of the Kyiv State Art Institute (now National Academy of Visual Arts and Architecture) in 1957. From July 1957 to 1961, he worked as an architect at the Kyivproekt State Design Institute, later as a senior architect. In 1961, he began his postgraduate studies at the Research Institute of Building and Architecture of the Ukrainian SSR Academy of Construction and Architecture. Between 1964 and 1968, he worked at the Kyiv Zonal Scientific Research Institute for Standard and Experimental Design of Residential and Public Buildings. From 1968 to 1990, he worked at the Kyiv branch of the Research Institute of Theory of Architecture and Urban Planning, becoming the head of the architecture theory sector in 1977 and the head of the sector of socio-economic problems from 1988.

He co-designed Boryspil International Airport in 1959–1961 as well as the competition project for the pavilion of the Ukrainian SSR at the trade fair in Marseille in 1959.

From 1959 to 1961, Yurii Yevreinov developed working drawings for a hotel in Kyiv and the designs for the facades of typical residential buildings in the Vidradnyi residential complex in Kyiv. During this time, he was also involved in the development of facades for a residential building and a café in Shevchenkivskyi District.

In 1982, a personal exhibition of his works took place in Kyiv.

Yurii Yevreinov was also an author who wrote about art and the quality of architecture, architectural formation, and researched problems related to the reconstruction of historical city centers in Ukraine. He was among the compilers of the book Architecture: A Short Dictionary-Handbook, published in 1995.

Yurii Yevreinov died on May 5, 1990, in Kyiv.

== Works ==
=== Artistic works ===
- "Leningrad. Peter and Paul Fortress. The Gate of Death", 1957,
- "Moscow. Smolensk Cathedral of the Novodevichy Convent", 1957,
- "Apses of St. Sophia", 1961,
- "Kizhi. Evening", 1963,
- "Old Walls", 1968,
- "Chaliapin's Grotto", 1974,
- "Pine", 1975,
- "Tsar's Beach", 1976,
- "The Bell Tower of St. Sophia of Kyiv", 1982,
- "Outskirts of Kislovodsk", 1984,
- "Battery Bay", 1986,
- "Mount Sokol", 1987.

=== Architecture ===
- Palace of Sports in Kyiv
- Boryspil International Airport
