= Protasiv Yar =

Neighborhood of Kyiv, Ukraine

Protasiv Yar Протасів Яр
- Neighborhood of Kyiv
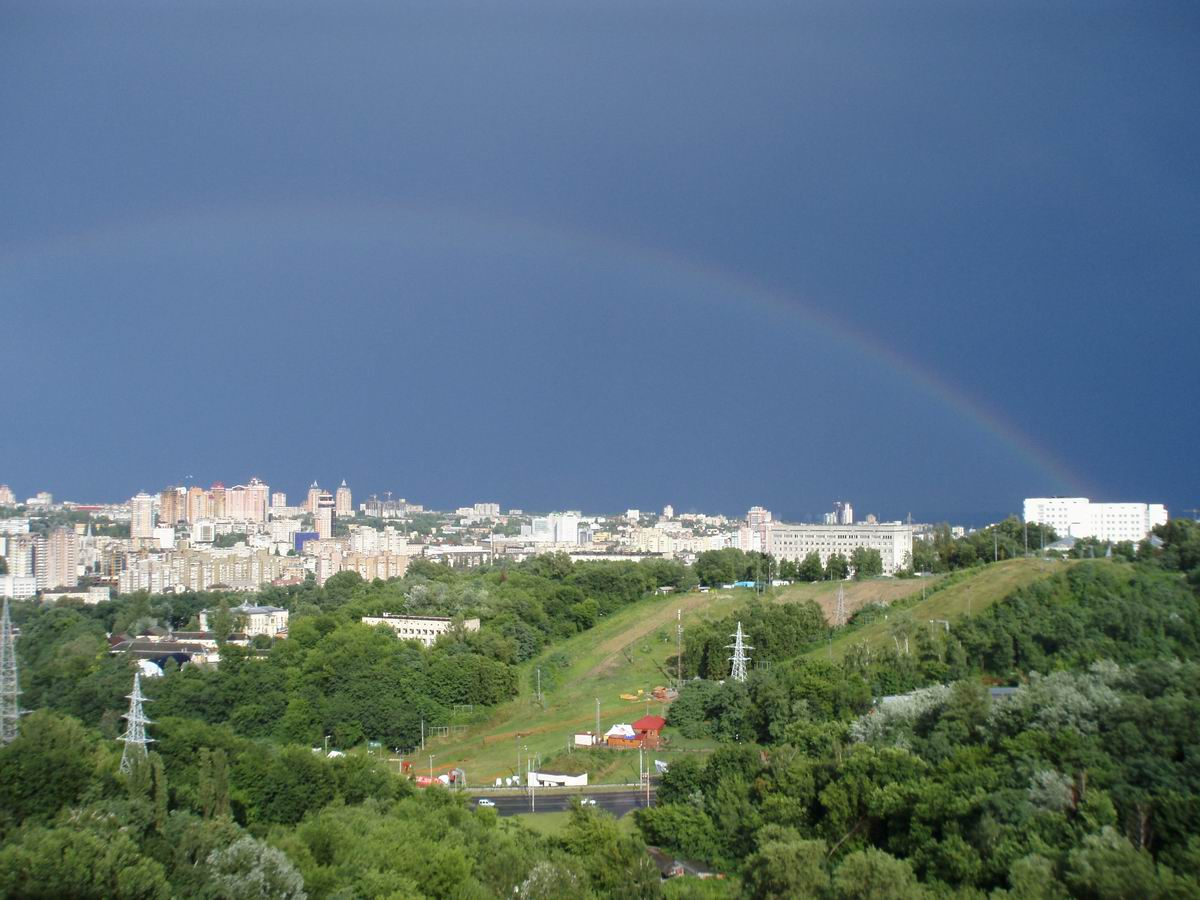
- Interactive map of Protasiv Yar
- Coordinates: 50°25′23″N 30°30′0″E
- Country: Ukraine
- City: Kyiv
- District: Solomianskyi and Holosiivskyi District

Protasiv Yar (Ukrainian: Протасів Яр) is a historical neighborhood located in Solomianskyi and Holosiivskyi (districts) of Kyiv, the capital of Ukraine. It is located between Baikova and Batyieva Mountains. Protasiv Yar railway station is located in the lower part of the neighborhood, close to Lybid River.

Yar means gully, and Protas is a male name, supposedly of a local villager or a former owner of the area.

The forest area estimates approximately 30 ha. The local activists fought to protect this area from illegal construction for several years; in 2018 Roman Ratushnyi founded Save Protasiv Yar initiative, which was later institutionalised. In July 2022, the Kyiv City Council supported the decision to create a landscape reserve on both slopes of Protasiv Yar in Kyiv.
