= Velyki Perehony =

Ukrainian adventure reality game show

- Presented by: Oleksandr "Fozzy" Sydorenko
- No. of teams: 10
- Winners: Valeria Nikiforets and Bohdana Prymak
- No. of legs: 12
- No. of episodes: 12 (13 including recap)

Release
- Original network: 1+1
- Original release: 13 April – 29 June 2013

Additional information
- Filming dates: 25 November – 22 December 2012

Velyki Perehony (Ukrainian: Великі Перегони; English: Great Race) is a Ukrainian reality competition show that was based on the American series The Amazing Race. Following the premise of other versions in the Amazing Race franchise, the show follows ten teams of two as they race around the world. The show was split into legs, with teams tasked to deduce clues, navigate themselves in foreign areas, interact with locals, perform physical and mental challenges, and travel by air, boat, car, taxi, and other modes of transport. Teams are progressively eliminated at the end of most legs for being the last to arrive at designated Pit Stops.

The show visited three continents and eight countries and traveled over 35,000 kilometres (22,000 mi) during twelve legs. Starting in Kyiv, teams travelled through the United Arab Emirates, Sri Lanka, Singapore, the Philippines, South Africa, the Netherlands, and Poland before returning to Ukraine, travelling through Lviv Oblast and finishing in Kyiv. The first team to arrive at the Finish Line wins the grand prize of ₴500,000.

The show was hosted by Oleksandr "Fozzy" Sydorenko and produced by Sister's Production (Сістерз Продакшн), in association with ABC Studios and premiered on 1+1 on 13 April 2013 at 20:00 EEST. The finale aired on 29 June, and a special "Life after the Race" episode aired on 6 July.

Beauty queens Valeria Nikiforets and Bohdana Primak were the winners, while common-law married couple Oleksiy Yeremeyev and Olena Dolzhenko finished in second place and father and son Kostyantin and Yakiv Potomkyiv finished in third place.

== Production ==
=== Development and filming ===
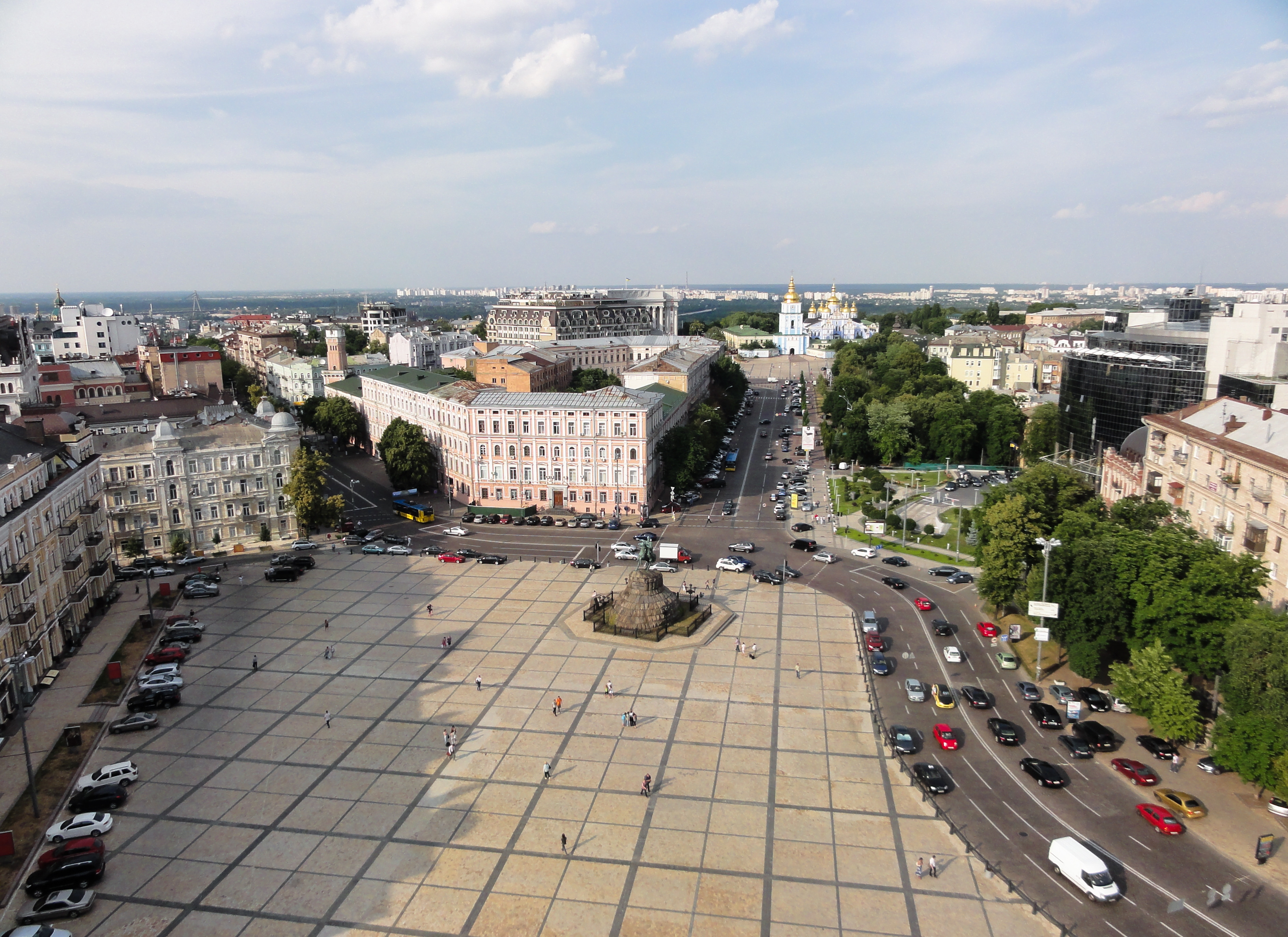
Sophia Square served as the Starting and Finish Line of Velyki Perehony.

On 23 July 2012, Ukrainian television network 1+1 announced that it had acquired the rights to make a version of The Amazing Race. On 23 November 2012, it was revealed that Ukrainian hip-hop singer Oleksandr "Fozzy" Sydorenko would host the show.

The show began filming on 25 November and lasted for four weeks. The show was produced by Sister's Production (Сістерз Продакшн), in association with ABC Studios. The first teaser for the show was released on 16 January.

Production arrived in the Philippines only a few days before the region was struck by Typhoon Bopha. (Note: The name Bopha in the Philippine authorities were designated its local name Pablo by Philippine Atmospheric, Geophysical and Astronomical Services Administration.) The fifth episode makes many remarks about the coming storm, and heavy rainclouds, wind and thunder could be seen while the teams were racing.

=== Casting ===
Casting for the show was announced on the website of 1+1 on 23 July 2012.

=== Marketing ===
The series' two sponsors are Carlsberg and Fa.

== Contestants ==
Ten teams of two make up the cast. At 72 years old, Vladimir from father and daughter team, Vladimir and Irina Vasilenko, is the oldest contestant in the Amazing Race franchise history. Other racers including beauty queens, athletes, actors and physicians, etc.

During the eleventh leg, Oleksiy proposed to Olena at the Pit Stop and she accepted.

Contestants	Age	Relationship	Hometown	Status
Volodymyr Vasylenko (Володимир)	72	Father & Daughter	Kharkiv	Eliminated 1st (in Dubai, United Arab Emirates)
Iryna Vasylenko (Ірина)	40	Father & Daughter	Kharkiv	Eliminated 1st (in Dubai, United Arab Emirates)
Alla Medvedev (Алла)		Mother & Daughter	Kyiv	Eliminated 2nd (in Colombo, Sri Lanka)
Oleksandra Medvedev (Олександра)		Mother & Daughter	Kyiv	Eliminated 2nd (in Colombo, Sri Lanka)
Anna Ivanchenko (Анна)		Married Actors	Kyiv	Eliminated 3rd (in Singapore)
Roman Ivanchenko (Роман)		Married Actors	Kyiv	Eliminated 3rd (in Singapore)
Andriy Ishchuk (Андрій)		Dating	Kyiv	Eliminated 4th (in Puerto Princesa, Philippines)
Iryna Kozyreva (Ірина)		Dating	Kyiv	Eliminated 4th (in Puerto Princesa, Philippines)
Natalia Mansfield-Murphy (Наталя)		Friends	Brovary, Kyiv	Eliminated 5th (in Garden Route, South Africa)
Tatiana Maslovskaya (Тетяна)		Friends	Brovary, Kyiv	Eliminated 5th (in Garden Route, South Africa)
Ihor Davydov (Ігор)	27	Friends/Athletes	Kyiv	Eliminated 6th (in Marken, Netherlands)
Vasyl Nischyk (Василь)		Friends/Athletes	Kyiv	Eliminated 6th (in Marken, Netherlands)
Oleksandr Lygashon (Олександр)		Physicians	Kyiv	Eliminated 7th (in Kraków, Poland)
Volodymyr Cherkassky (Володимир)		Physicians	Kyiv	Eliminated 7th (in Kraków, Poland)
Kostyantin Potomkyiv (Костянтин)		Father & Son	Kyiv	Third Place
Yakiv Potomkyiv (Яків)	18	Father & Son	Kyiv	Third Place
Oleksiy Yeremeyev (Олексій)		Common-Law Married	Simferopol, Crimea	Second Place
Olena Dolzhenko (Олена)		Common-Law Married	Simferopol, Crimea	Second Place
Valeria Nikiforets (Валерія)		Beauty Queens	Lviv	Winners
Bohdana Prymak (Богдана)		Beauty Queens	Lviv	Winners

== Results ==
The following teams participated in the season, with their relationships at the time of filming. Placements are listed in finishing order:

Team	Position (by leg)												Roadblocks performed
Team	1	2	3	4^{6}	5	6	7	8	9	10	11	12	Roadblocks performed
Valeria & Bohdana	2nd	4th	1st	3rd	5th^{7}	3rd	2nd	1st^{9}	1st	1st	1st	1st	Valeria 6, Bohdana 7
Olena & Oleksiy	9th^{1}	7th^{3}	7th	2nd	7th^{7}	2nd	3rd	4th	2nd	3rd	3rd^{12}	2nd	Olena 4, Oleksiy 9
Kostyantin & Yakiv	8th^{1}	5th	4th	1st	2nd	1st	4th	2nd	3rd	2nd	2nd	3rd	Kostyantin 6, Yakiv 7
Oleksandr & Volodymyr	7th	9th^{4}	6th^{5}	6th	1st	5th	5th	5th	4th^{10}	4th			Oleksandr 6, Volodymyr 5
Ihor & Vasyl	1st	2nd	2nd	4th	6th^{7}	4th	1st	3rd	5th^{11}				Ihor 5, Vasyl 5
Tatiana & Natalia	6th	6th	5th	5th	4th	6th	6th^{8}						Tatiana 3, Natalia 5
Andriy & Iryna	5th	1st	3rd	7th	3rd	7th							Andriy 4, Iryna 3
Anna & Roman	4th	3rd	8th	8th									Anna 1, Roman 3
Alla & Oleksandra	3rd	8th	9th										Alla 2, Oleksandra 1
Volodymyr & Iryna	10th^{2}												Volodymyr 1, Iryna 0

Key

- A red team placement indicates that the team was eliminated.
- A blue team placement indicates that the team came in last on a non-elimination leg.
  - An underlined blue placement indicates that the team would receive a 30-minute (Leg 2) or 1-hour (Leg 8) penalty after finishing the next leg.
  - An italicized blue placement indicates that the team had to perform an extra task on the next leg.
- An underlined leg number indicates that there was no mandatory rest period at the Pit Stop and all teams were ordered to continue racing. An underlined team placement indicates that the team came in last, was ordered to continue racing, and didn't receive a penalty or extra task in the next leg.

Notes

1. ^^{a} ^{b} Kostyantin & Yakiv and Oleksiy & Olena initially arrived 8th and 10th (last) place, respectively, but were issued 1-hour penalties because they were unable to complete the Roadblock due to dusk. While Kostyantin & Yakiv's placement were not affected, Oleksiy & Olena were moved to 9th place due to another team incurring a longer penalty (see note 2).
2. Volodymyr & Iryna initially arrived 9th, but were issued a 4-hour penalty for quitting the Roadblock. However, due to Oleksiy & Olena having a shorter penalty time, their placement dropped to last place, which resulted in their elimination.
3. Oleksiy & Olena initially arrived 3rd, but were issued a 4-hour penalty because Oleksiy failed to complete the Roadblock. Four teams checked in during their penalty time, dropping Oleksiy & Olena to 7th.
4. Oleksandr & Volodymyr initially arrived 8th, but they did not pay their taxi driver. They were required to settle the bill before being allowed to check in. Alla & Oleksandra checked in during their penalty time, dropping Oleksandr & Volodymyr to last place; however they were not eliminated as Fozzy notified that this leg was non-elimination.
5. Oleksandr & Volodymyr initially arrived 4th, but were issued a 30-minute penalty for arriving last in the previous non-elimination leg. Kostyantin & Yakiv and Tatiana & Natalia checked in during their penalty time, dropping Oleksandr & Volodymyr to 6th.
6. Each team (except Yakiv and Roman) were unable to complete the Roadblock and were issued 4-hour penalties at the site of the Roadblock.
7. ^^{a} ^{b} ^{c} Valeria & Bohdana, Ihor & Vasyl, and Olena & Oleksiy initially arrived 1st, 2nd and 3rd, respectively, but each teams were issued 1-hour penalties because they rented a jeepney to themselves. Per the show's rules, once teams rent public transportation (i.e. Jeepneys) for themselves, it is considered private transportation which they are prohibited from using. Four teams checked in during their penalty time, dropping them to 5th, 6th and 7th (last) place, respectively. However, they were notified the leg was a no-rest leg and Fozzy gave their next clue.
8. Tatiana took a 4-hour penalty for not completing the Roadblock in Leg 7 due to her fear of heights. However, since Tatiana & Natalia checked-in at the Pit Stop last, they were eliminated without the penalty being applied.
9. Valeria & Bohdana initially arrived 1st, but were issued a 1-hour penalty for asking a local to guide them to the air strip in Leg 8. Per the show's rules, teams can only consist of not more than two people, and cannot hire locals to join their team, even if temporarily. This did not affect their placement.
10. Oleksandr & Volodymyr initially arrived 1st, but received a 1-hour penalty for arriving last on the previous non-elimination leg. Three teams checked in during their penalty time, dropping Oleksandr & Volodymyr to 4th.
11. Ihor failed to complete the Roadblock in Leg 9. After Ihor's third attempt in the Roadblock and all other teams had checked in, Fozzy came out to the Roadblock location to inform them of their elimination.
12. Oleksiy & Olena initially arrived 2nd, but they asked two different locals to help guide them as they drove during Leg 11. Oleksiy & Olena fell to last place; however they were not eliminated as Fozzy notified that this leg was non-elimination.

== Prizes ==
Individual prizes were awarded to the first team to complete certain legs.

- Leg 5 – A case of Carlsberg beer
- Leg 6 – A case of Carlsberg beer
- Leg 7 – A case of Carlsberg beer
- Leg 8 – A case of Carlsberg beer
- Leg 9 – A case of Carlsberg beer and a certificate for free Fa products for a year
- Leg 10 – A case of Carlsberg beer
- Leg 11 – A case of Carlsberg beer
- Leg 12 – ₴500,000

== Race summary ==
Route map

Destinations	Air travel Rail travel Water travel Bus travel Helicopter travel Bicycle travel Gondola travel
Route Markers	Завдання на вибір (Detour) Завдання для одного (Roadblock) Фініш (Pit Stop)

=== Leg 1 (Ukraine → United Arab Emirates) ===
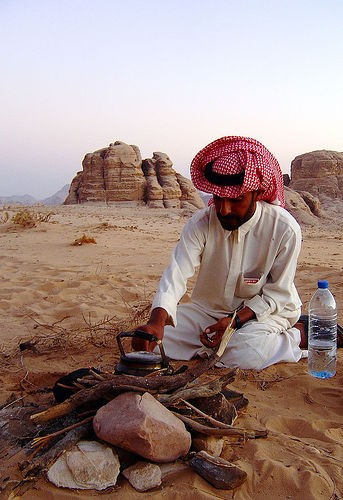
In the first leg, teams had to have their photograph taken with a local wearing traditional Arab garments to obtain a postcard to send to Kyiv.

Airdate: 13 April 2013

- Kyiv, Ukraine (Sophia Square) (Starting Line)
- Kyiv (Boryspil International Airport – Terminal F)
- Kyiv (Boryspil International Airport) → Dubai, United Arab Emirates (Dubai International Airport)
- Dubai (Burj Khalifa – Observation Deck)
- Dubai (Old Souk Abra Station)
- Dubai (Dubai Gold Souk – Yousuf Abdul Rahman Al Awazi Trading Co.)
- Dubai (Dubai Spice Souk – Al-Arsa Souq or Gold Souq)
- Palm Jumeirah (Atlantis, The Palm – Aquaventure (Leap of Faith))
- Al Faqa (Al Faqa Desert)
- Dubai (Madinat Jumeirah)

This series' first Detour was a choice between Скло (Sklo – Glass) or Золото (Zoloto – Gold). In Sklo, teams had to assemble ten hookahs to receive their next clue. In Zoloto, teams had to arrange five pieces of jewellery according to cost to receive their next clue.

In this series' first Roadblock, one team member had to drive a dune buggy through a marked course in the desert to receive their next clue.

Additional tasks

- At Sophia Square, teams had to search among pictures of different countries' coats of arms to find the one of the nation they would be visiting, the United Arab Emirates, before they could drive to the airport to find their next clue.
- Before proceeding to Yousuf Abdul Rahman Al Awazi Trading Co. at the Gold Souk, teams had to have their photograph taken with someone wearing the traditional Arab garments. If their photographs were satisfactory, they would be given a stamp for a postcard they would have to choose from. After placing the postcard in a post box for Kyiv, the shopkeeper would give them their next clue.
- At Aquaventure, teams had to slide down the Leap of Faith water slide, which dropped them six stories down a nearly 90° incline and through a tunnel beneath the aquarium's shark lagoon, to receive their next clue from the lifeguard.

=== Leg 2 (United Arab Emirates → Sri Lanka) ===
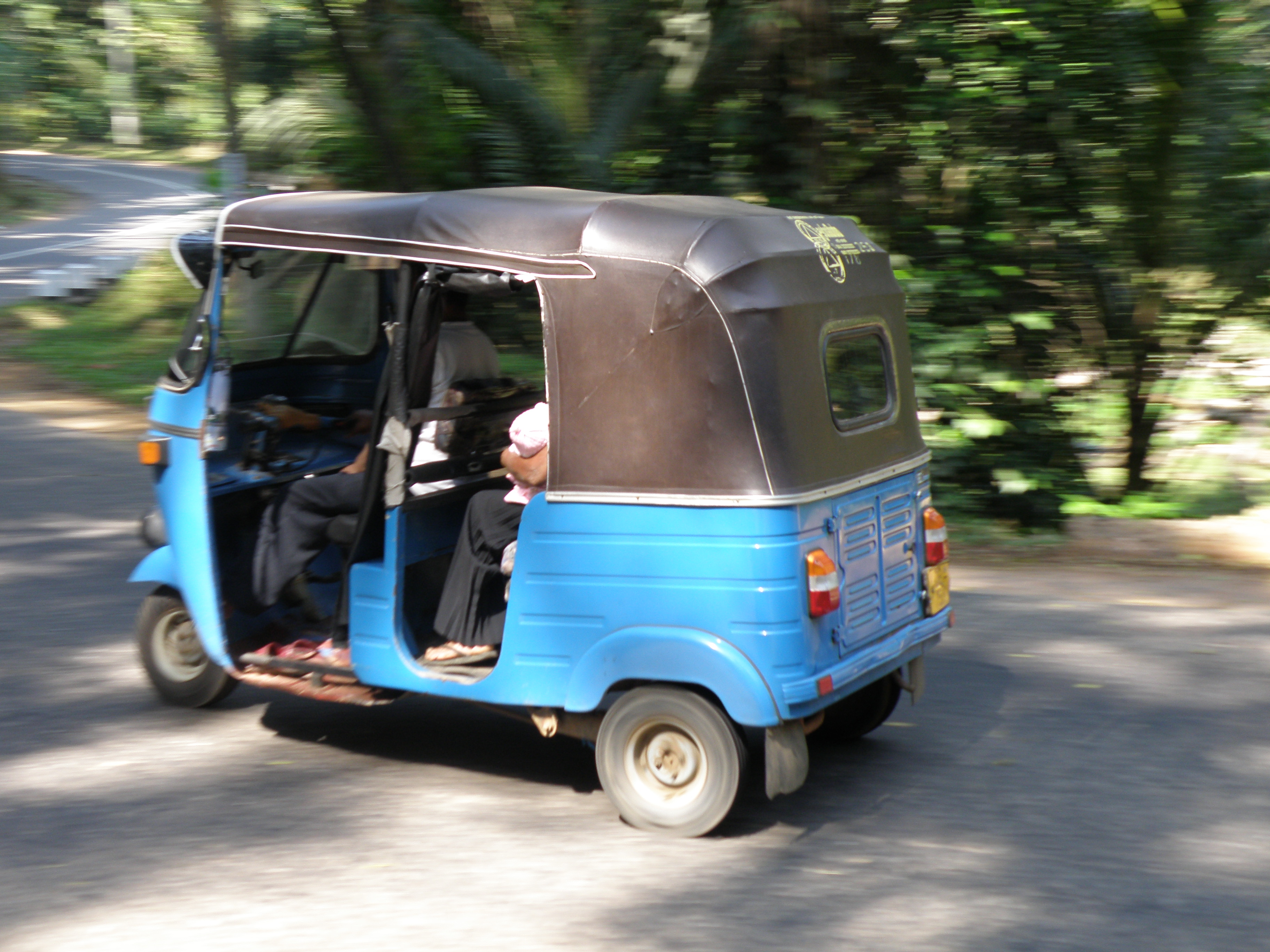
In the second leg, teams had to have their photograph taken with a blue auto rickshaw in order to obtain a postcard to send to Kyiv.

Airdate: 20 April 2013

- Dubai (Dubai Media City Park)
- Dubai (Dubai International Airport) → Colombo, Sri Lanka (Bandaranaike International Airport)
- Kahatowita (Sri Bodhirukkarama Temple)
- Colombo (Cinnamon Gardens Post Office)
- Colombo (Kollupitiya Market or Laundry Depot)
- Colombo (Donegal House)
- Colombo (Sri Lanka Masks Festival)
- Colombo (Seema Malaka)

This leg's Detour was a choice between Гостро (Hostro – Hot) or Брудно (Brudno – Dirty). In Hostro, teams had to carry 50 kilograms (110 lb) of spicy peppers through a market and then mash the peppers into a sauce to receive their next clue. In Brudno, teams had to wash a bag full of dirty laundry, and then hang it on a clothesline to receive their next clue.

In this leg's Roadblock, one team member had to spin a large wheel with pictures of various masks on it, memorize the mask on the slot where the wheel stopped, and find the actual mask within the festival crowd to receive their next clue.

Additional tasks

- At Bodhirukkarama Temple, teams had to find a needle in haystack and use it to sew an emblem onto traditional Buddhist clothes to receive their next clue.
- Before proceeding to the post office, teams had to have their photograph taken with a blue auto rickshaw while wearing the Buddhist clothes from the previous task. They can then trade this photo for a postcard, which they would have to mail to Kyiv.
- At Donegal House, teams had to retrieve their next clue from the bottom of a basket of cobras.

=== Leg 3 (Sri Lanka) ===
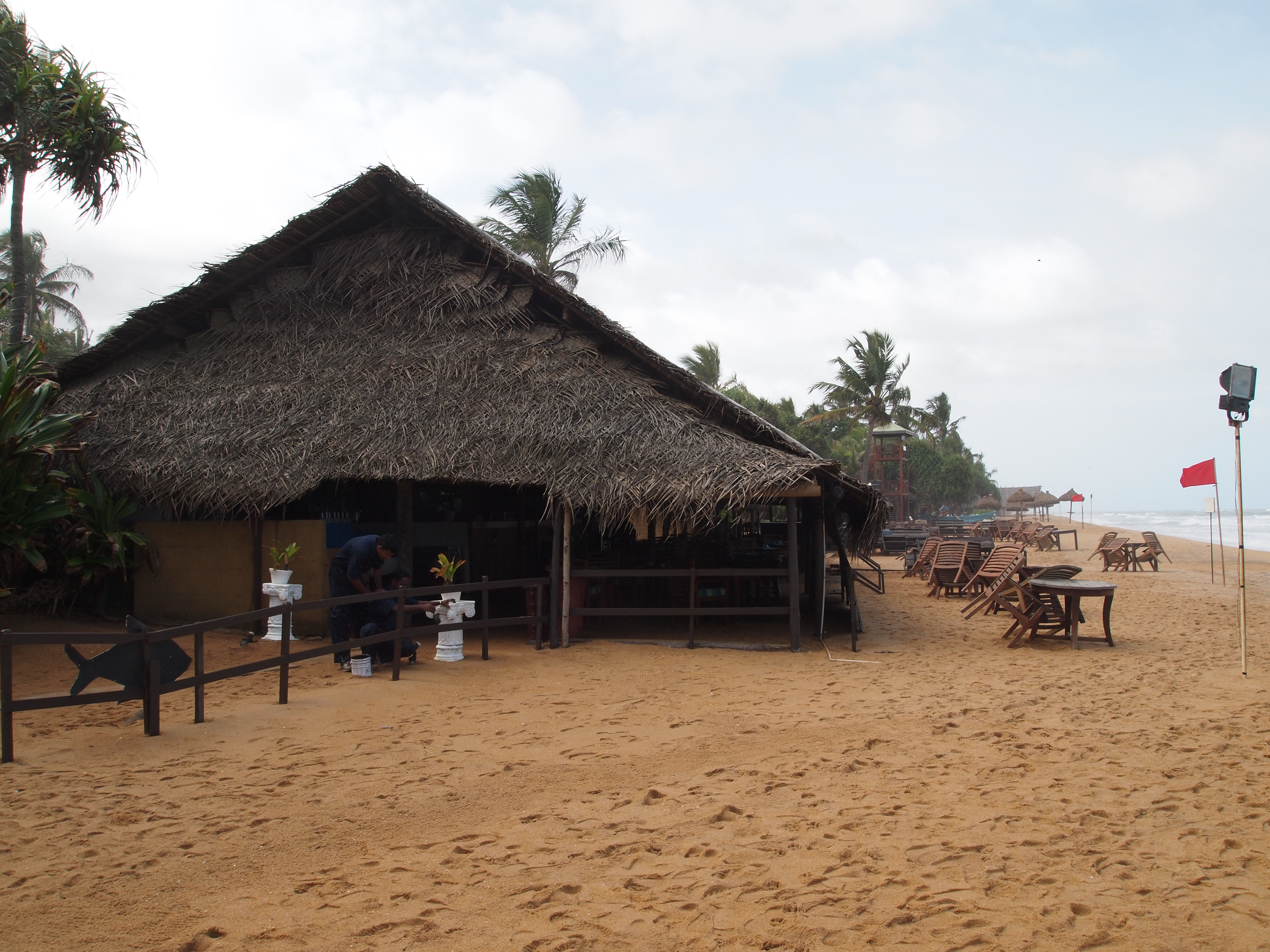
The Pit Stop for this leg was at the Mount Lavinia Hotel's beach.

Airdate: 27 April 2013

- Colombo (Galadari Hotel)
- Colombo (Mahazime Chicken Shop)
- Colombo (Fort Railway Station) → Kalutara (Kalutara South Railway Station)
- Kalutara (Main Street)
- Bandaragama (Wevita Lake)
- Bandaragama (Bandaragama Post Office)
- Panadura (Gangula Devalaya)
- Mount Lavinia (Mount Lavinia Hotel)

In this leg's Roadblock, one team member had to prepare and sell 20 coconuts to earn at least 500 Sri Lankan rupees to receive their next clue.

This leg's Detour was a choice between Вода (Voda – Water) or Коржіки (Korzhiky – Cakes). In Voda, teams had to wash the traditional markings off an elephant to receive their next clue. There were only five elephants available, first come, first served. In Korzhiky, teams had to make 150 manure cakes using only their bare hands and put them on a wall to receive their next clue.

Additional tasks

- At the Mahazime Chicken Shop, teams had to pick up two chickens in cages and carry them for the rest of the leg.
- After the Detour, teams would be given a yellow shirt with the show's logo on it. Teams had to have their photograph taken with a local wearing this shirt and with the chickens they had brought with them before proceeding to the post office. If their photograph was satisfactory, they could exchange it for a postcard which they would need to mail to Kyiv.
- At Gangula Devalaya, one team member had to perform one of two tasks. They would either run across a bed of hot coals in their bare feet or lie on a bed of nails for three minutes. After they completed one task, they would then find out that the other team member would have to perform the remaining task. This task was incorrectly presented as a Roadblock.

=== Leg 4 (Sri Lanka → Singapore) ===
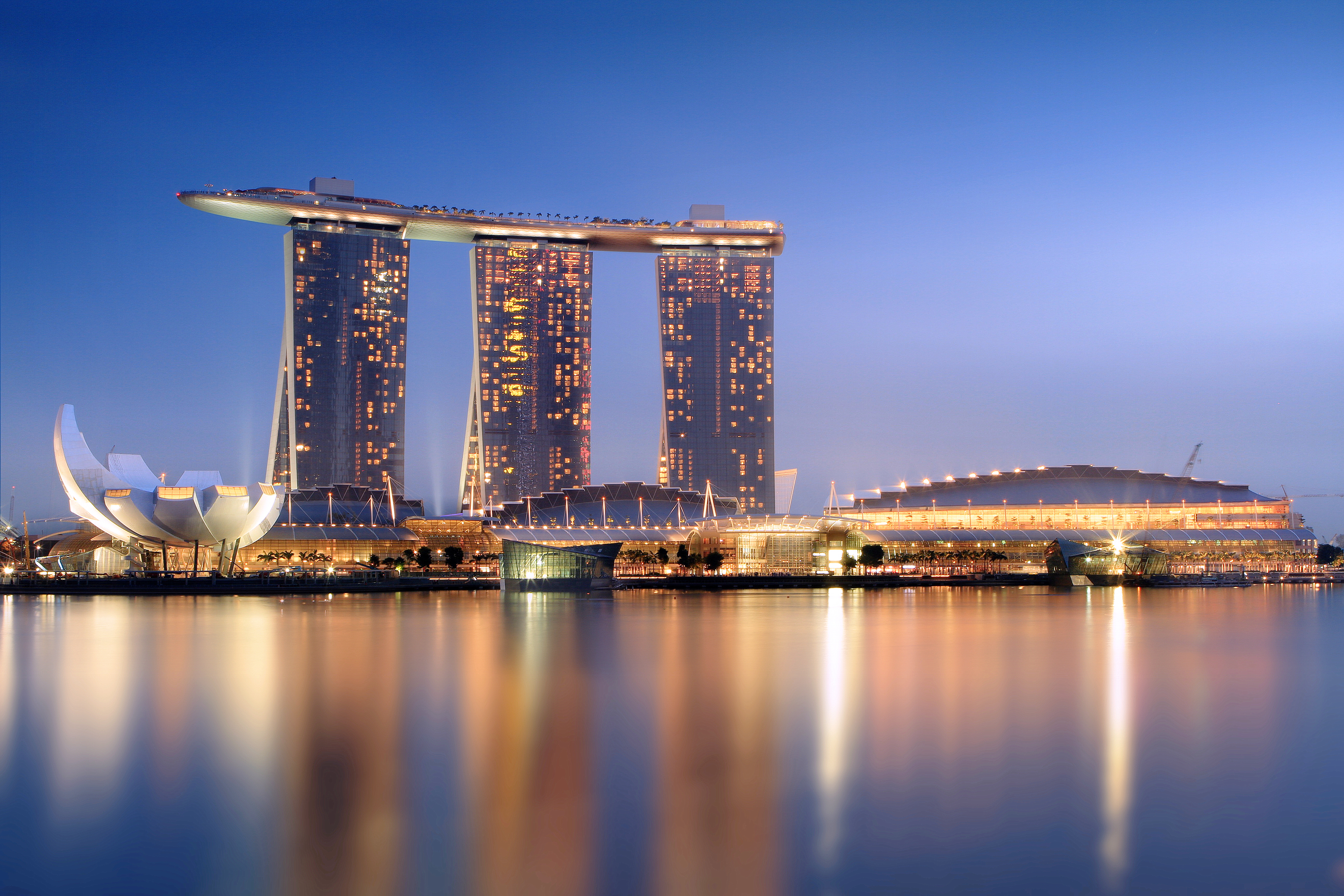
In Singapore, teams had to have their photograph taken with the Marina Bay Sands in the background to obtain a postcard to send to Kyiv.

Airdate: 4 May 2013

- Colombo (Bandaranaike International Airport) → Singapore (Changi Airport)
- Singapore (Bugis Junction – Fountain)
- Singapore (Clarke Quay – G-MAX Reverse Bungy or Swissôtel The Stamford)
- Singapore (Climb Asia Rock Climbing Wall)
- Singapore (Sentosa – MegaZip Adventure Park)
- Singapore (Raffles Place – Postcard Stall)
- Singapore (Chinese Garden – Rainbow Bridge)

This leg's Detour was a choice between Політ (Polit – Flight) or Похід (Pokhid – Walk). In Polit, teams had to ride the G-MAX Reverse Bungy. While riding, teams had to spot an umbrella lit with the Amazing Race colours. Once they locate the umbrella at a stall, they could get their next clue from the shopkeeper. In Pokhid, teams had to go to the 226-metre (741 ft) Swissôtel The Stamford and climb all 73 floors to the top to get their next clue.

In this leg's Roadblock, one team member had to climb an outdoor rock climbing wall to retrieve their next clue.

Additional tasks

- At Bugis Junction, teams had to retrieve their next clue from a clue box surrounded by a dancing fountain.
- On Sentosa, teams had to ride the MegaZip, a 450-metre (1,480 ft) long zip-line, to receive their next clue.
- Before proceeding to the postcard stall in Raffles Place, teams had to have their photograph taken with the Marina Bay Sands in the background. If their photograph was satisfactory, they could choose a postcard from the stall. After having it stamped, they could proceeded to mail the postcard to Kyiv in a nearby post box to receive their next clue from a postman.
- After mailing their postcard, teams had to search for the location of their next Pit Stop and had to figure out was that it was printed on the flyers being distributed by locals in the vicinity.

=== Leg 5 (Singapore → Philippines) ===
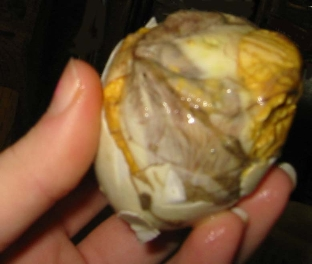
In this leg's Roadblock, one member of each team had to eat six baluts.

Airdate: 11 May 2013

- Singapore (Changi Airport) → Puerto Princesa, Philippines (Puerto Princesa International Airport)
- Puerto Princesa (Malvar Street)
- Puerto Princesa (Puerto Princesa Public Market)
- Puerto Princesa (Baywalk – Postcard Peddler)
- Puerto Princesa (Sta. Lourdes Wharf) to Honda Bay (Starfish Island or Luli Island)
- Puerto Princesa (San Jose Jeepney Terminal to Sabang Beach)

In this leg's Roadblock, one team member had to eat six fertilised duck embryos, a local dish known as balut, to receive their next clue.

This leg's Detour was a choice between Пляшкі (Plyashki – Bottles) or Рибкі (Rybki – Fish). In Plyashki, teams had to search among hundreds of bottles scattered around the shore for one containing a message with their next destination written on it. In Rybki, teams had to count the number of fish inside a basket amidst the distractions of the vendors to receive their next clue.

Additional tasks

- At Malvar Street, teams were instructed to find Delores, which they had to figure out was the name of a tricycle roving the street with "DELORES" painted on the front. Once they have figured this out, they could get their next clue from the driver.
- Before proceeding to the Baywalk, teams had to take have their photograph taken with at least one team member and twenty locals. At least four of these locals should be wearing hats, one had to be holding flowers, one had to be holding a large soft toy, and at least one had to be holding a broom. If their photograph was satisfactory, they could choose a postcard from a peddler. Once they affix the stamp and have it mailed to Kyiv in a nearby post box, a postman would give them their next clue.

=== Leg 6 (Philippines) ===
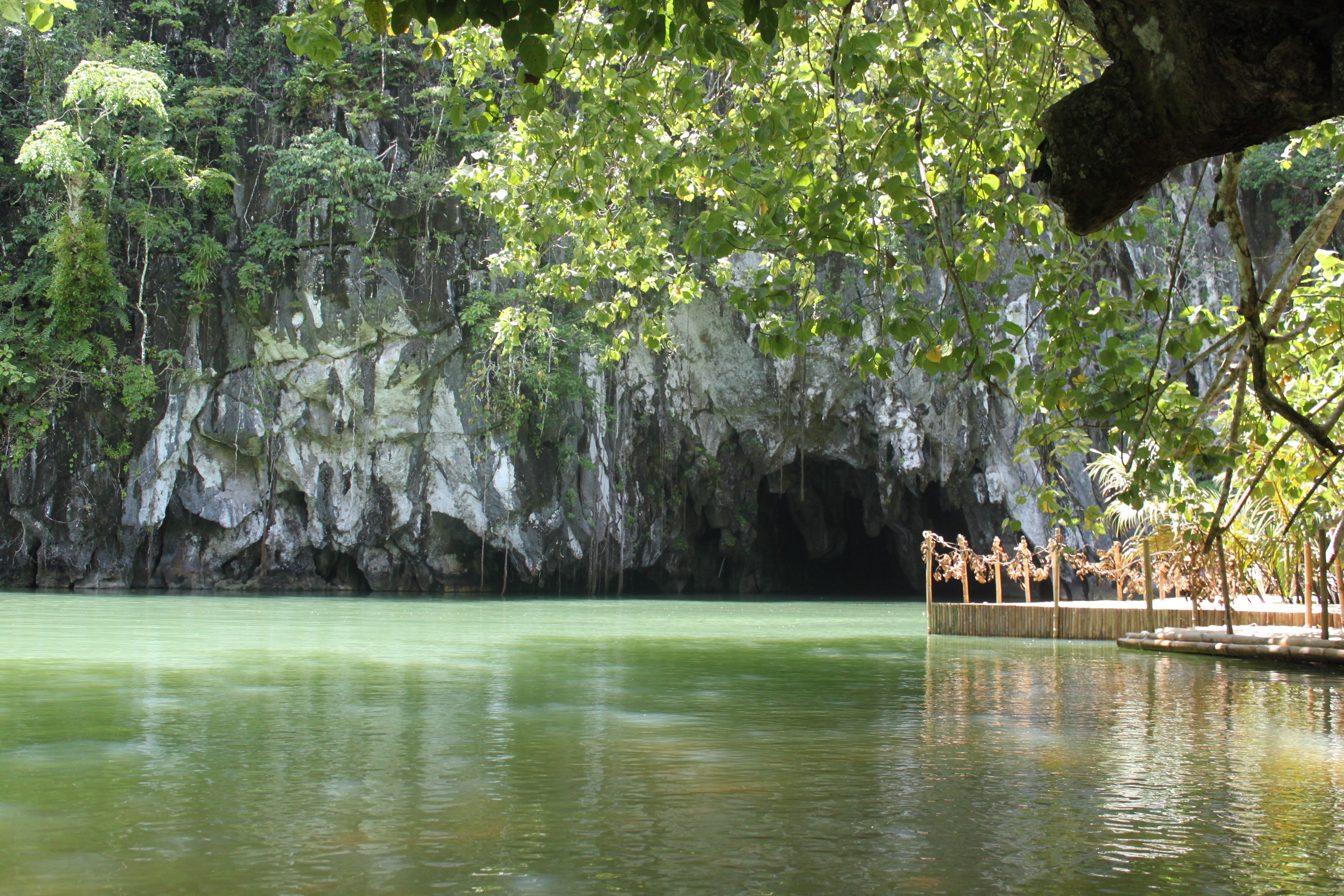
In this leg, teams visited Puerto Princesa Subterranean River in Palawan.

Airdate: 18 May 2013

- Puerto Princesa (Sabang Beach) (Overnight Rest)
- Puerto Princesa (Puerto Princesa Subterranean River)
- Puerto Princesa (Sabang X Zipline)
- Puerto Princesa (Sabang Beach)
- Puerto Princesa (Karst Mountain – Elephant Cave)

In this leg's first Roadblock, one team member had to ride an 800-metre (0.50 mi) long zip line and memorize the colour patterns on four boats ("green, red, yellow"; "blue, yellow, green"; "red, blue, green"; "yellow, blue, red"). Once ashore, they had to reconstruct the patterns using coloured rectangular boards to receive their next clue.

In this leg's second Roadblock, the team member who did not perform the previous Roadblock had to crack open coconuts with a knife until they could find one with red-coloured flesh to receive their next clue.

Additional tasks

- On Sabang Beach, teams had to assemble a tent that they would be sleeping in for the night before receiving a departure time for the next morning.
- At the Puerto Princesa Subterranean River, teams had to enter the river, photograph the date of the first visit of Lt. H.G. Warwick to the Subterranean River (March 18, 1937) and present it to a park ranger to receive their next clue.

=== Leg 7 (Philippines → South Africa) ===
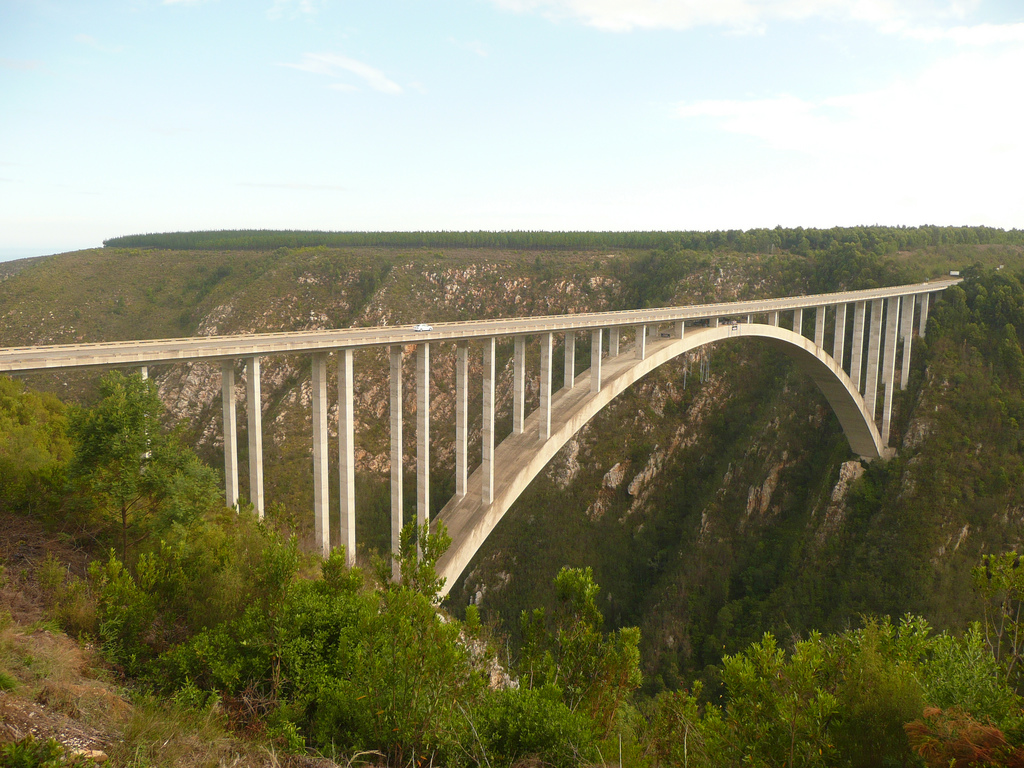
In this leg's Roadblock, one team member had to bungee jump from the 216-metre (709 ft) high Bloukrans Bridge.

Airdate: 25 May 2013

- Puerto Princesa (Shinar Travelasia)
- Puerto Princesa (Puerto Princesa International Airport) → Port Elizabeth, South Africa (Port Elizabeth International Airport)
- Port Elizabeth (Seaview Predator Park)
- Garden Route National Park (Bloukrans Bridge)
- Garden Route National Park (Khoisan Village)
- Stormsrivier (Storms River Mouth)

This leg's Detour was a choice between Палиця (Palytsya – Stick) or Яйце (Yaytse – Egg). In Palytsya, teams had to throw a traditional South African club called a knobkierie from a distance to shatter three vases suspended in the air and receive their next clue. In Yaytse, teams had to use a straw to fill 12 ostrich eggs with water and then bury them in the sand to receive their next clue.

In this leg's Roadblock, one team member had to jump off the highest bridge bungee jump in the world at Bloukrans Bridge to receive their next clue.

Additional tasks

- At Seaview Predator Park, teams had to hand-feed a lion or a tiger with a bottle to get their next clue.
- At the Khoisan Village, teams had to eat a roasted sheep's head known locally as a "Smiley" to get their next clue.
- At Storms River Mouth, teams had to find a local park ranger and take a photograph with him. They could then exchange this picture with a local postcard vendor to get a postcard that they would mail to Kyiv before checking into the Pit Stop.

=== Leg 8 (South Africa) ===
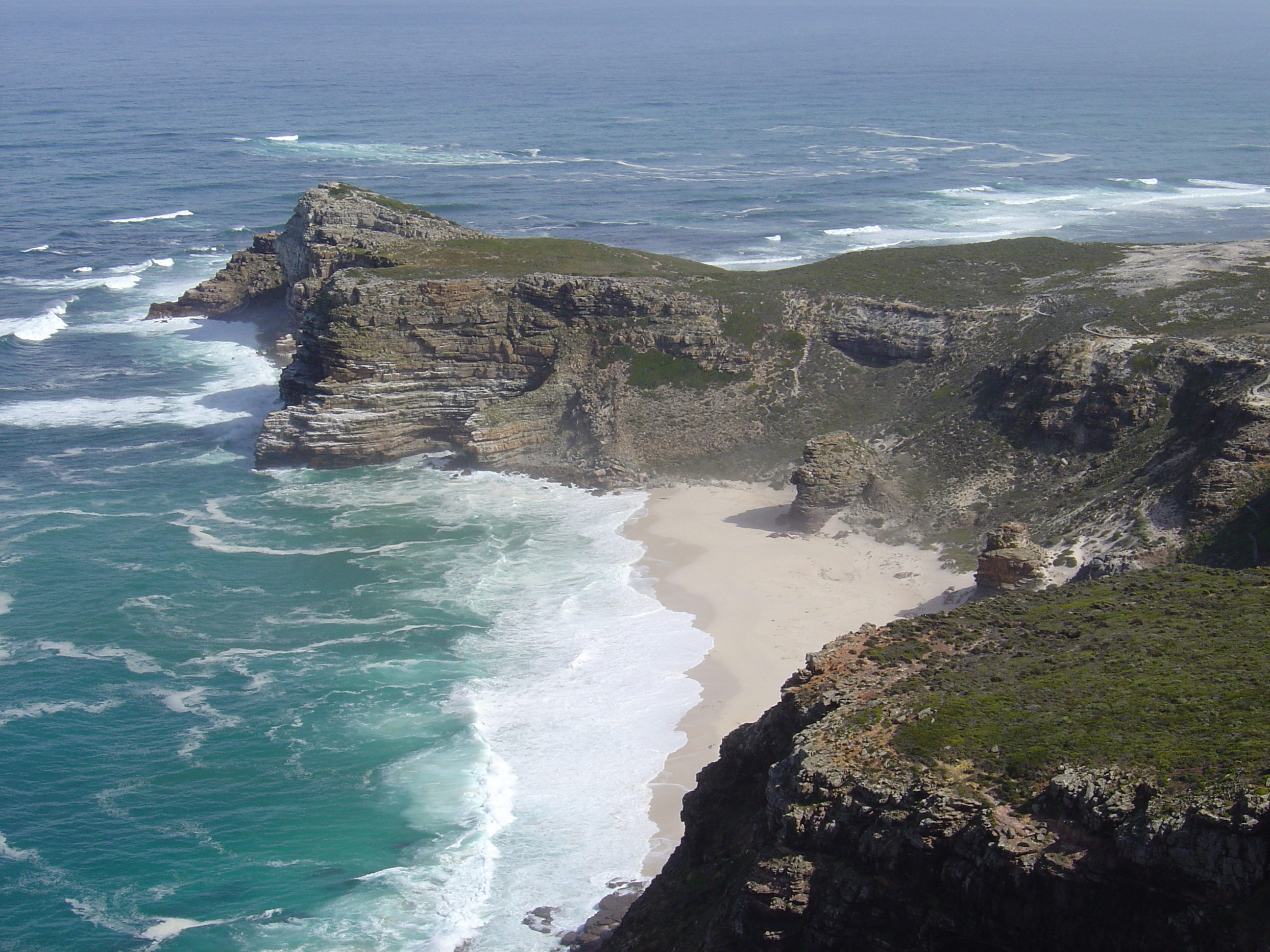
In this leg, teams had to photograph the Cape of Good Hope to obtain a postcard to send to Kyiv.

Airdate: 1 June 2013

- Port Elizabeth (Port Elizabeth International Airport)
- Port Elizabeth (Port Elizabeth International Airport) → Cape Town (Cape Town International Airport)
- Cape Town (Table Mountain)
- Melkbosstrand (Melkboss Air Strip)
- Cape Town (Table View – Rietvlei Wetland Reserve)
- Langa (Omega Hair Salon, Laundry & Internet)
- Cape Town (St Georges Mall)
- Cape Town (Cape Town Diamond Museum or Bo-Kaap – 93 Wale Street)
- Cape Town (Rhodes Memorial)

In this leg's Roadblock, one team member had to perform a tandem skydive from a height of 9,000 feet (2,700 m) to receive their next clue.

This leg's Detour was a choice between блиск (Blysk – Shine) or Смак (Smak – Taste). In Blysk, teams had to search through a museum, housing hundreds of diamonds, for the first diamond ever discovered in South Africa, named Light Hearts to receive their next clue. In Smak, teams had to cook a traditional South African delicacy, a samosa, to receive their next clue.

Additional tasks

- At the top of Table Mountain, teams had to photograph the Cape of Good Hope. If their photograph was satisfactory, they could choose a postcard and after placing the postcard in a post box for Kyiv, a postman would give them their next clue.
- At the Rietvlei Wetland Reserve, teams had to help SANCCOB by preparing a meal with 20 ingredients for African penguins to receive their next clue.
- At the Omega Hair Salon, teams had to shave the heads of two locals to receive their next clue.
- At St Georges Mall, teams had to search for a troupe of gumboot dancers to receive their next clue.

=== Leg 9 (South Africa → Netherlands) ===
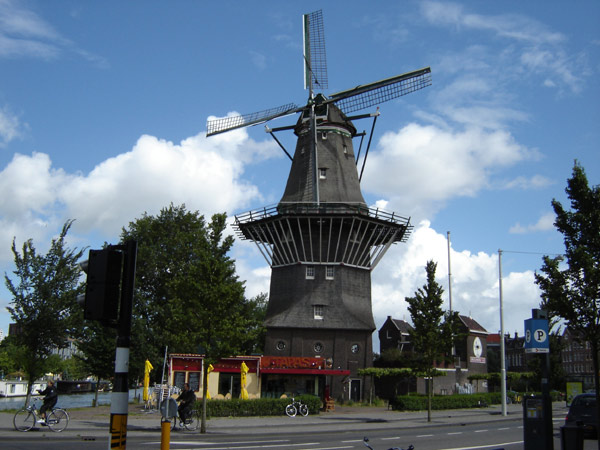
In the ninth leg, teams had to have their photograph taken with the De Gooyer windmill in the background to obtain a postcard to send to Kyiv.

Airdate: 8 June 2013

- Cape Town (Cape Town International Airport) → Amsterdam, Netherlands (Amsterdam Airport Schiphol)
- Amsterdam (Schiphol Airport Railway Station → Amsterdam Muiderpoort Railway Station)
- Amsterdam (Melkmeisjesbrug → Magere Brug)
- Amsterdam (West Market Square)
- Amsterdam (Brouwerij 't IJ)
- Marken (Post Office)
- Marken (Harbour)
- Marken (Paard van Marken)

This leg's Detour was a choice between Сир (Syr – Cheese) or Шарманка (Sharmanka – Hand Organ). For both task, teams had to travel by boat through the Amsterdam canals to West Market Square. In Syr, teams had to don traditional Dutch outfits and use a wooden stretcher to carry cheese from a stockpile to a scale until they weighed out exactly 400 kilograms of cheese to receive their next clue. Only one team could use the scale at a time and the first team to place a piece of cheese on the scale would get to use it. In Sharmanka, teams had to find one of three street organs, and then one team member had to run the machine while the other asked for tips until they earned €30 to receive their next clue from the organ grinder.

In this leg's Roadblock, one team member had to eat five soused herrings hanging from a string, while blindfolded and without using their hands, to receive their next clue.

Additional tasks

- At Melkmeisjesbrug, teams had to search among hundreds of bikes for one with a clue attached that they would pedal to their next destination.
- At Brouwerij 't IJ, teams had to have their photograph taken with two locals and the entire De Gooyer windmill in the background. If their photograph was satisfactory, teams would receive a postcard to send to Kyiv from the Marken Post Office.
- After the Roadblock, teams had to ride a tandem bike to the Pit Stop.

=== Leg 10 (Netherlands → Poland) ===
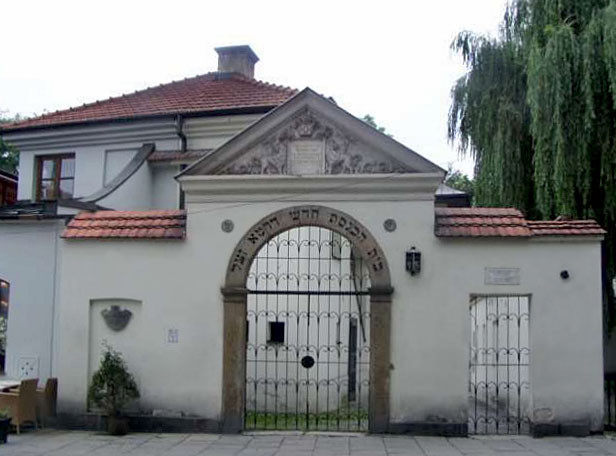
In the tenth leg, teams had to photograph the Remuh Synagogue to obtain a postcard to send to Kyiv.

Airdate: 15 June 2013

- Amsterdam (Vondelpark)
- Amsterdam (Amsterdam Airport Schiphol) → Warsaw, Poland (Warsaw Chopin Airport)
- Warsaw (Warszawa Centralna Railway Station) → Kraków (Kraków Główny Railway Station)
- Kraków (Remuh Synagogue)
- Kraków (Klezmer-Hois)
- Kraków (Kraków Barbican)
- Kraków (Main Square)
- Kraków (Main Square or Town Hall Tower and St. Mary's Basilica)
- Kraków (Bishop's Palace)
- Kraków (Wawel Hill – Wawel Dragon Statue)
- Kraków (Sheraton Grand Kraków)

In this leg's Roadblock, one team member had to complete a jigsaw puzzle of a man on a horse to receive their next clue.

This leg's Detour was a choice between Проїхатися (Proïkhatysya – Ride) or Пройтися (Proy̆tysya – Walk). In Proïkhatysya, one team member had to be in the driver's seat of an old Polski Fiat car with a local in the other seat. The other team member had to push the car around the Main Square and was not allowed help from locals. After they are successful, they would be given their next clue. In Proy̆tysya, teams had to count and add up the number of stairs in the Town Hall Tower and one of the towers in St. Mary's Basilica. They were not however required to give the exact number of stairs, 352, and could give any number between 350 and 354. If they get any number between that, they would be given their next clue.

Additional tasks

- At Remuh Synagogue, teams had to have their photograph taken at the synagogue gates. If their photograph was satisfactory, they would be given a stamp and a postcard. After affixing the stamp onto the postcard and mailing it to Kyiv in a post box outside the Klezmer-Hois, a postman would give teams their next clue.
- At the Main Square, teams had to correctly recite a Polish tongue-twister, Chrząszcz brzmi w trzcinie w Szczebrzeszynie, to a man on a horse (as in the jigsaw puzzle of the Roadblock) to receive their next clue.
- At the banks of the Vistula river, teams had to recreate a story in Polish mythology about the Wawel Dragon. As in the story, teams had to stuff a lamb with sulphur. One team member had to retrieve the sulphur on the other side of the river with a bucket and bring it to their team member with the lamb soft toy. After stuffing and sewing the lamb closed, teams had to have it weighed on a scale near a statue of the Wawel Dragon. If their stuffed lamb balances with another lamb on the other scale, teams would receive their next clue.

=== Leg 11 (Poland) ===
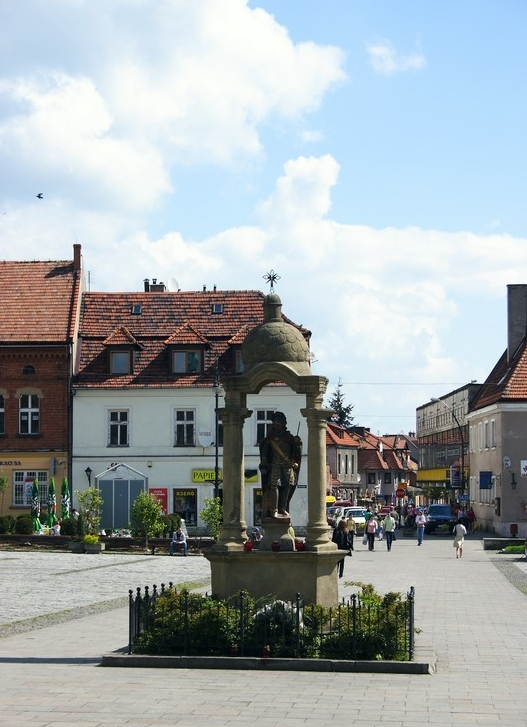
In the eleventh leg, teams had to have their photograph taken with a Saint Florian monument in Myślenice to obtain a postcard to send to Kyiv.

Airdate: 22 June 2013

- Kraków (Kanonicza Street)
- Kraków (Kościuszko Mound)
- Wieliczka (Wieliczka Salt Mine) or Tyniec (Tyniec Benedictine Abbey)
- Myślenice (Market Square)
- Czorsztyn (Cape Stylchen)
- Niedzica (Niedzica Castle)

This leg's Detour was a choice between Король (Korol – King) or Монах (Monakh – Monk). In Korol, teams had to travel to the Wieliczka Salt Mine and descend down the mines, where they had to push a minecart down a track. Then, they had to dig through the contents of the minecart to find a crystal key that they could use to open a locked compartment which contained their next clue, which instructed teams to find St Kinga's Chapel inside the mine to find their next clue. In Monakh, teams had to travel to the Tyniec Benedictine Abbey, where they had to abseil down the cliffs to reach a cave with baskets of food. Teams then had to transport two baskets back up to the abbey and present them to a monk, who would give them their next clue.

In this leg's Roadblock, one team member had to shoot a bow and arrow at a target and either hit the target five times or hit the apple held in the centre of the target once to receive their next clue.

Additional tasks

- Teams' first clue directed them to find the oldest street in Kraków: Kanonicza Street.
- At Market Square in Myślenice, teams would have to have their photograph taken with the Saint Florian monument. If their photographs were satisfactory, they would be given a postcard to mail to Kyiv from a kiosk. After placing the postcard in a nearby post box, a postman would give them their next clue.

=== Leg 12 (Poland → Ukraine) ===
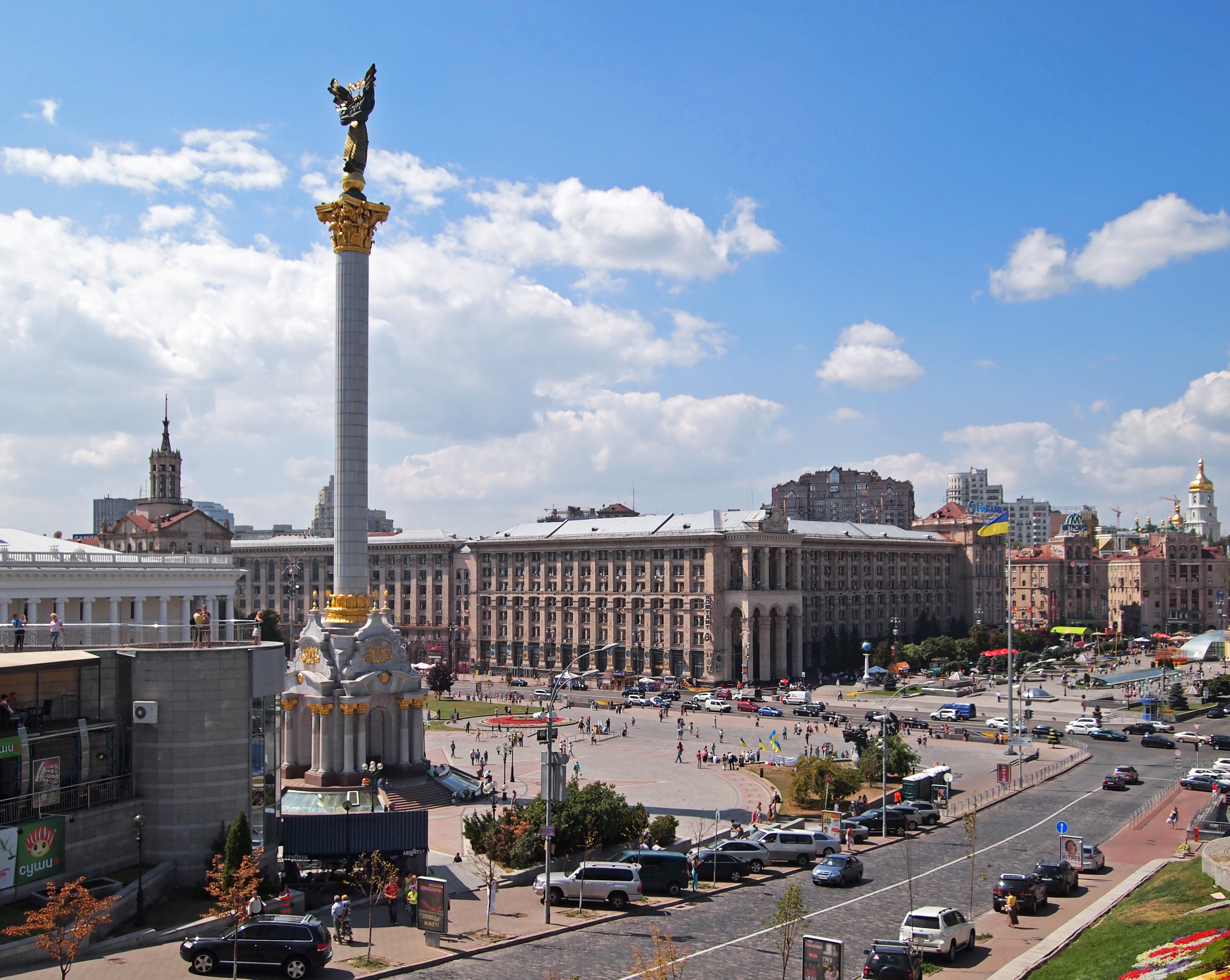
In Kyiv, teams had to retrieve their postcards at the Central Post Office in Independence Square.

Airdate: 29 June 2013

- Niedzica → Lviv, Ukraine
- Lviv (Market Square – Adonis Fountain)
- Lviv (Lviv Railway Station) → Kyiv (Kyiv-Pasazhyrskyi Railway Station)
- Kyiv (Kyiv-Mohyla Academy)
- Kyiv (Protasiv Yar Ski Resort)
- Kyiv (Lviv Handmade Chocolate)
- Kyiv (Mamayeva Sloboda)
- Kyiv (Independence Square – Central Post Office)
- Kyiv (Sophia Square)

For coming last on the previous leg, Oleksiy & Olena had to gather 50 people in the market square and have them perform the wave before they could continue racing.

In the series' final Roadblock, one team member had to snow tube down a hill, memorizing a series of flags from the countries they visited on the way down. At the bottom, they would have to arrange them in the correct order (United Arab Emirates, Sri Lanka, Singapore, Philippines, South Africa, Netherlands, Poland, and Ukraine) to receive their next clue.

The series's final Detour was a choice between Глечик (Hlechyk – Pot) and Гарбуз (Harbuz – Pumpkin). In Hlechyk, teams had to knock down six clay pots using a whip. In Harbuz, teams had to slash clean through six pumpkins with a saber in one slash each. At the end of either Detour, teams had to climb a slippery snow hill to receive their next clue.

Additional tasks

- Upon arrival in Kyiv, teams had to find a marked taxi who would give them their next clue.
- At the library at Kyiv-Mohyla Academy, teams had to search the bookshelves for a marked book. They then had to use a stencil to outline certain letters in the book that would reveal a password, which they could use to receive their next clue.
- At Lviv Handmade Chocolate, teams had to make 10 cups of homemade hot chocolate and sell them to people on the streets, making ₴200, to receive their next clue.
- At the Central Post Office, teams had to retrieve all the postcards that they sent during the season to receive their final clue from a mail carrier.

== Reception ==
The series premiered with a 4.9% rating with a 14% share of viewers aged 18 to 54. Before the finale, casting for a second season was announced but it did not come to fruition.
