= Kuchmyn Yar Street =

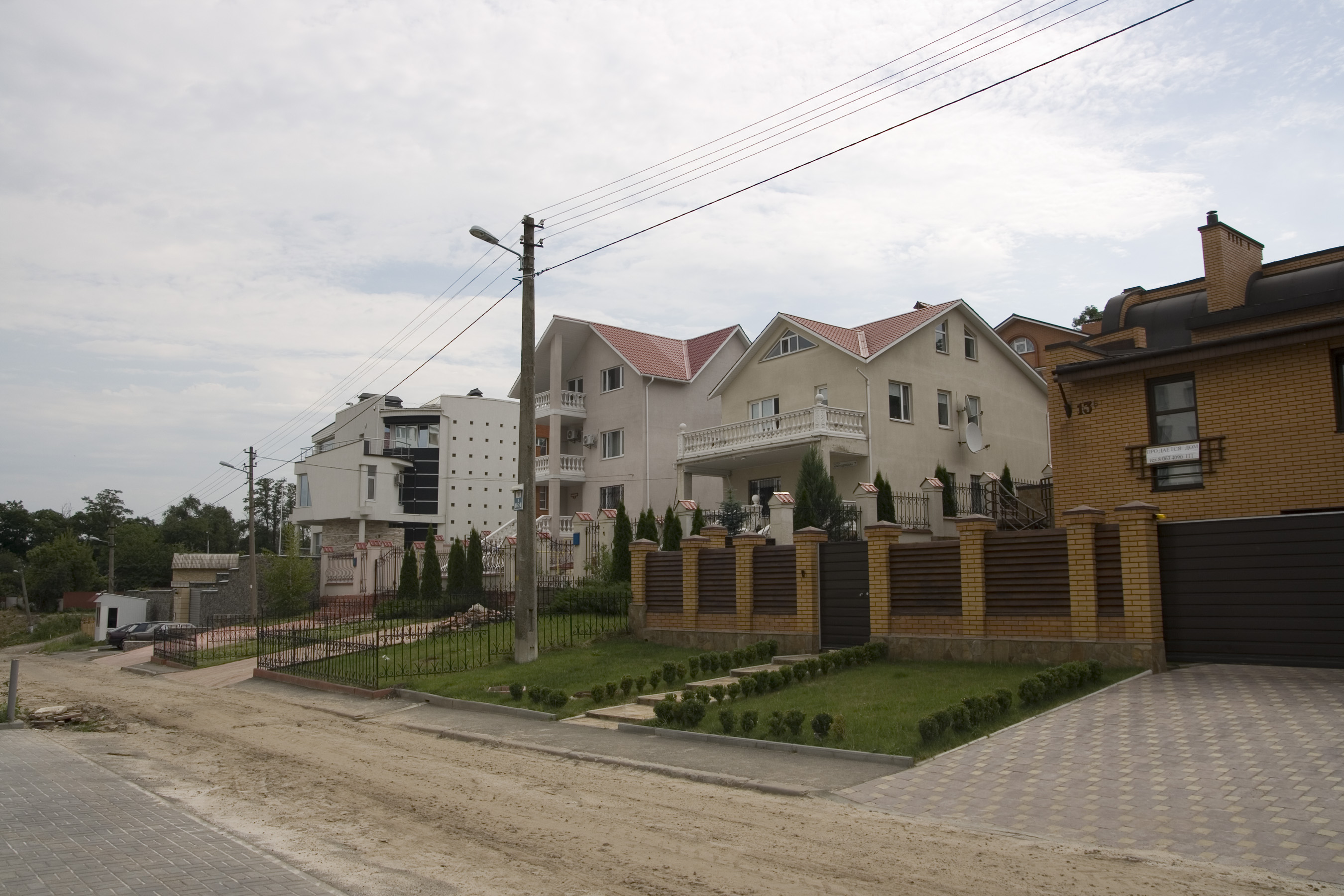
- Native name: Вулиця Кучмин Яр (Ukrainian)
- Former name(s): Krasnodonska, Markelova
- Postal code: 03035
- Coordinates: 50°26′11″N 30°29′30.76″E

Kuchmyn Yar Street is a street located in the Batyieva Hora neighborhood of Solomianskyi District, Kyiv, Ukraine. It is located between Petra Krivonosa Square and Rozdilna street.

The street was founded in the 19th century as Kuchmyn Yar Lane. In 1926, it was renamed to Markelova Lane in honor of a worker who died during the January Uprising of 1918. In the mid-1930s, this name fell into disuse. Between 1955 and 2017 street was named Krasnodonska. On 12 October 2017, Kyiv City Council, renamed ten streets in Kyiv and gave names to 39 new streets. Krasnodonska Street was renamed to Kuchmyn Yar.

The embassy of Saudi Arabia in Ukraine is located at 1-3, Kuchmyn Yar street.
