= Batyieva Hora =

Batyieva Hora Батиєва Гора
- Neighborhood
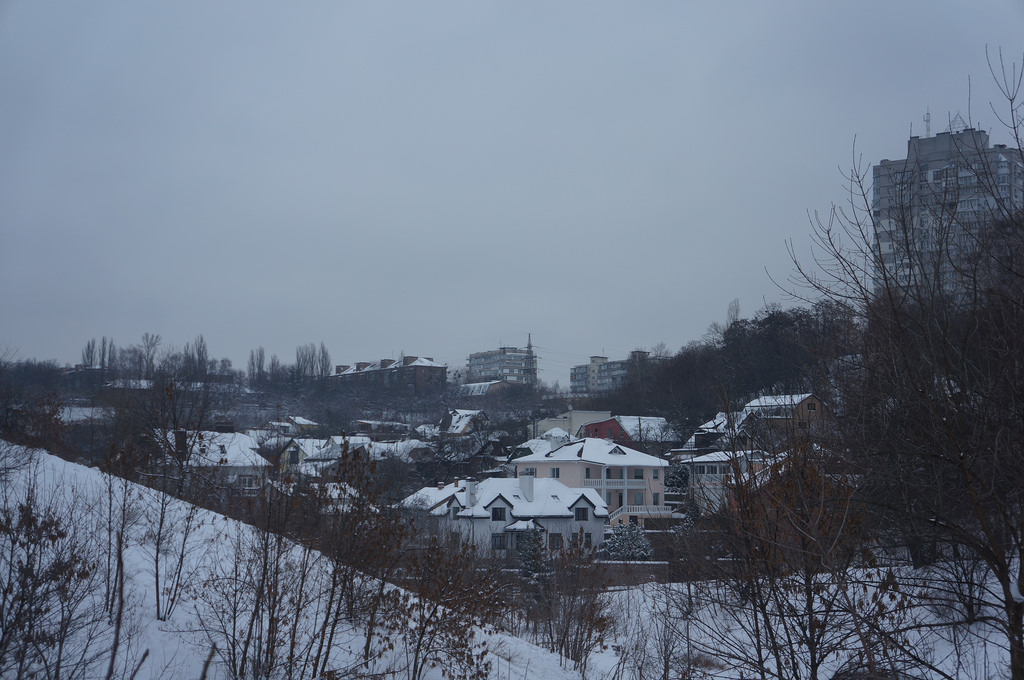
- View of Batyieva Hora from Solomianka
- Interactive map of Batyieva Hora
- Coordinates: 50°25′46.02″N 30°29′41.31″E
- Country: Ukraine
- City: Kyiv
- Urban district: Solomianskyi District
- Time zone: UTC+2 (EET)
  - Summer (DST): UTC+3 (EEST)

Batyieva Hora (Ukrainian: Батиєва Гора) is a former village, and now a neighborhood in the Solomianskyi District of Kyiv, the capital of Ukraine. It is located on the right bank of the Dnieper, on the side of the hill above the river Lybid. Burial grounds of Zarubintsy culture dated in the 2nd-4th century AD were discovered in Batyieva Hora.

The name was first recorded on Kyiv city maps in 1861 and 1874 as "Batyievi graves", named after the Bati burial mound. Until the end of the 19th century, the area belonged to the Sofia Cathedral Metropolitan House and was used as a pasture for livestock. The village was founded at the end of the 19th or beginning of the 20th century and was populated by railroad workers. The settlement was included within the borders of Kyiv in 1909. In 1911, the village had 10 streets and 1 lane. The historical layout and a significant part of the original one-story manor buildings have survived to this day.

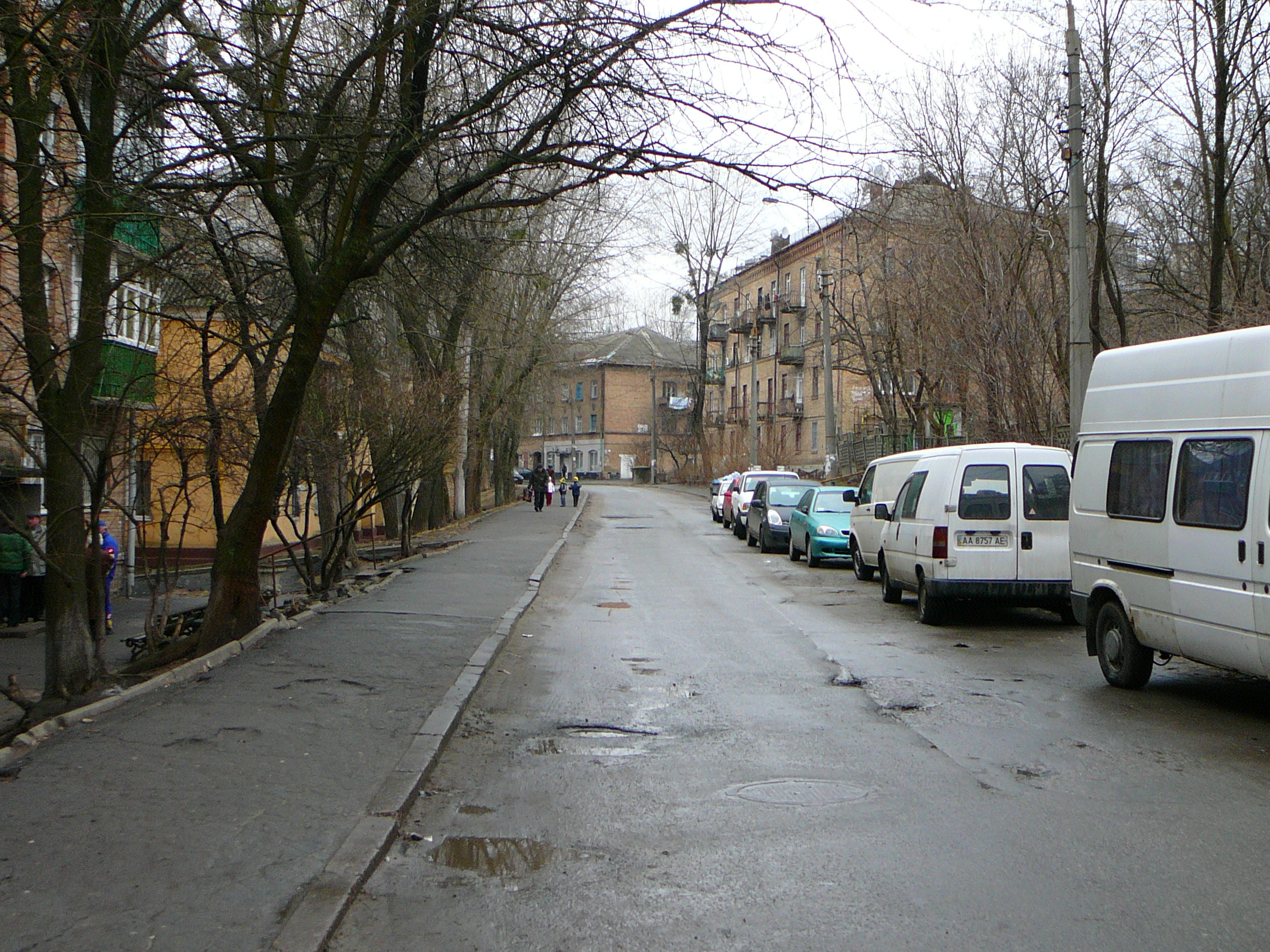
Horodnia Street

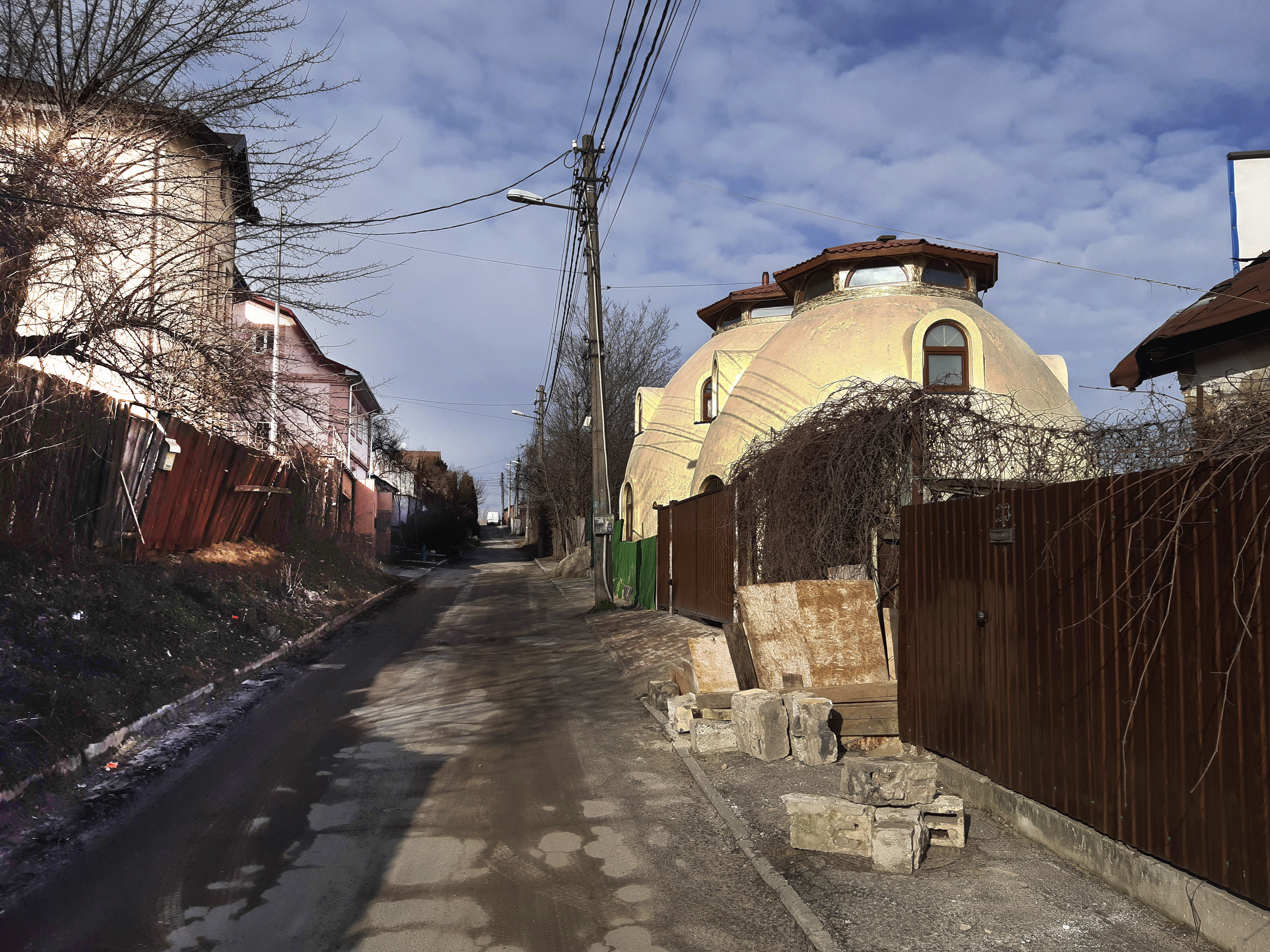
Hromadska Street

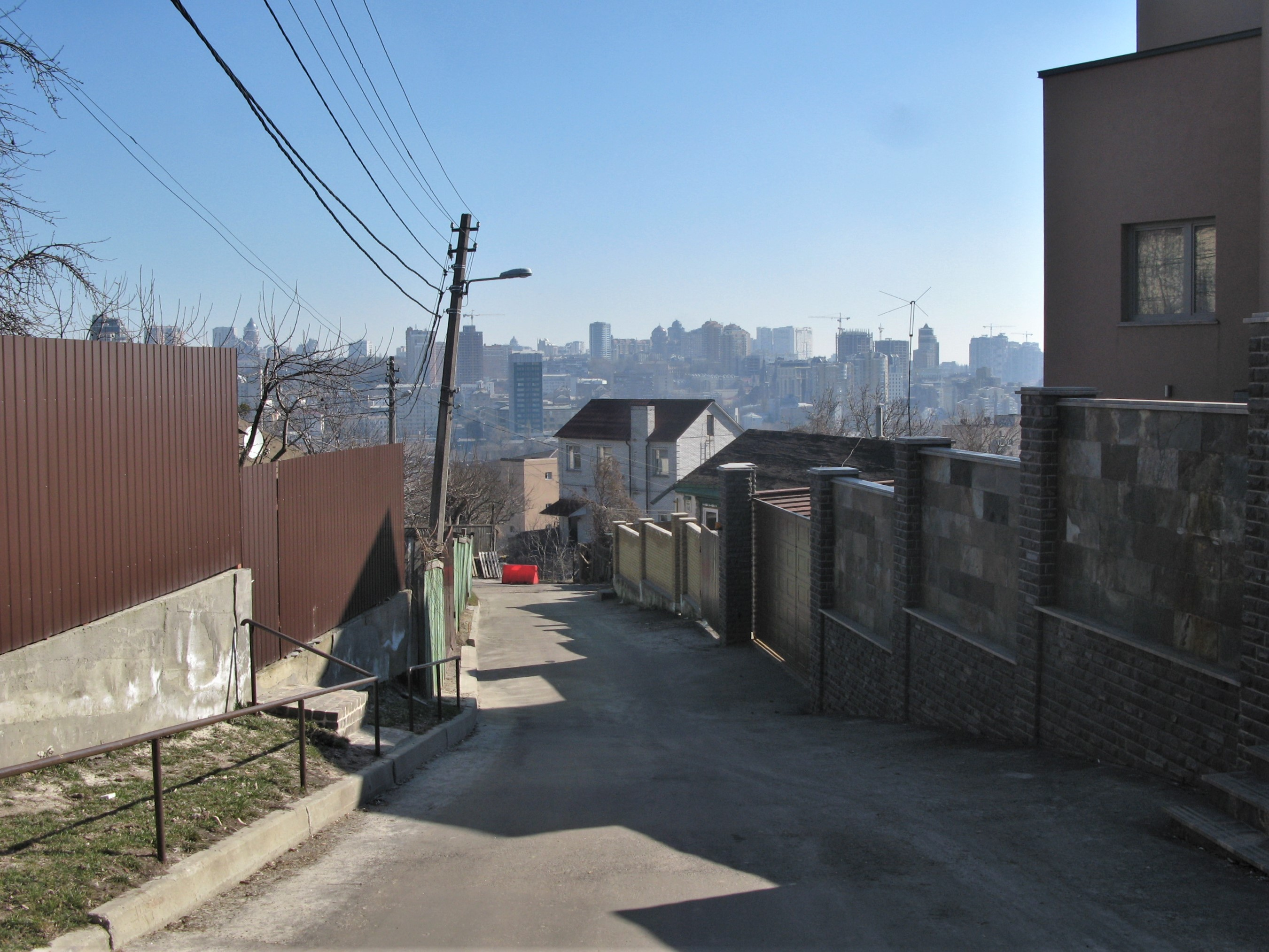
Radisna Street

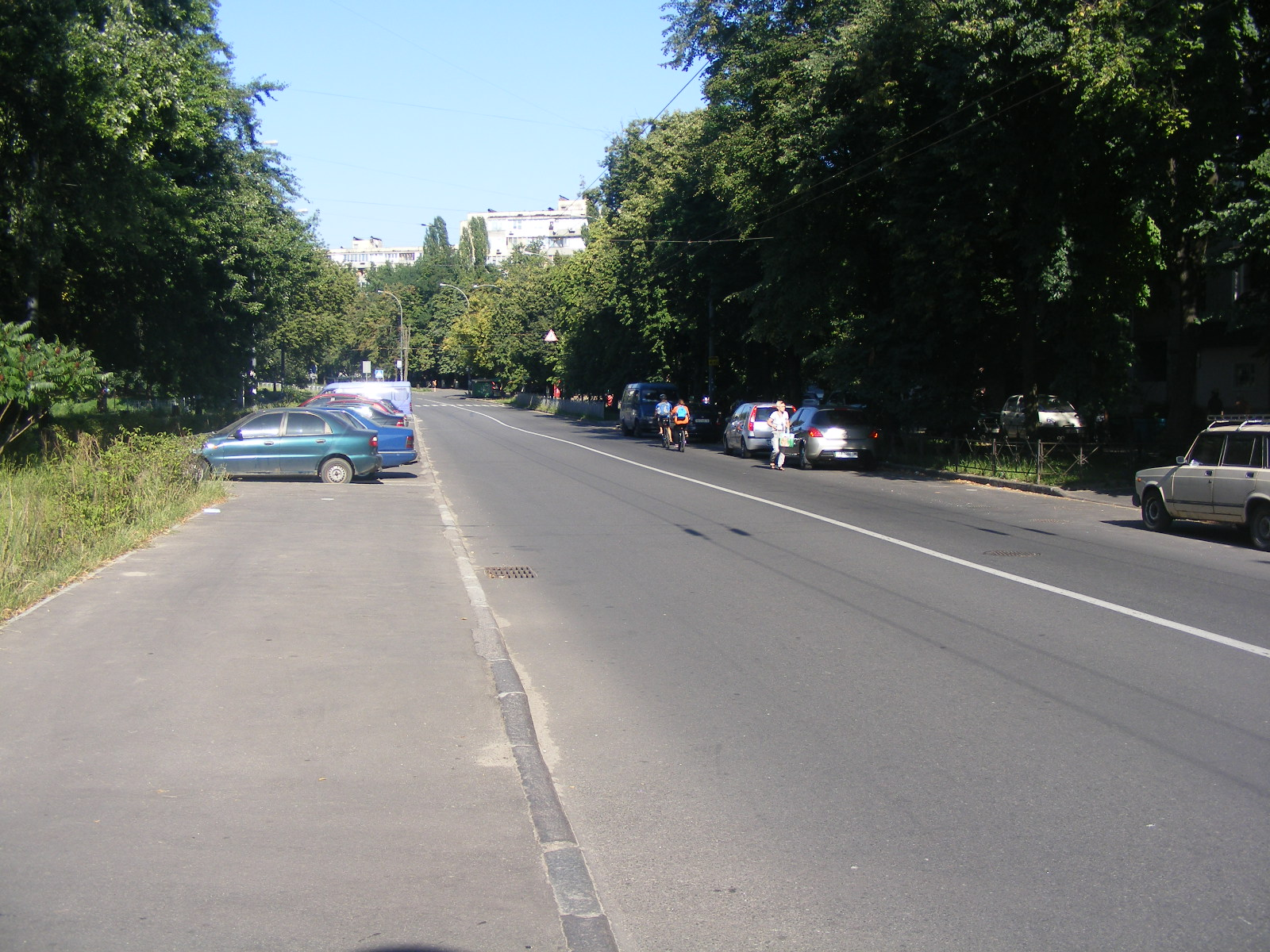
Romana Ratushnoho Street

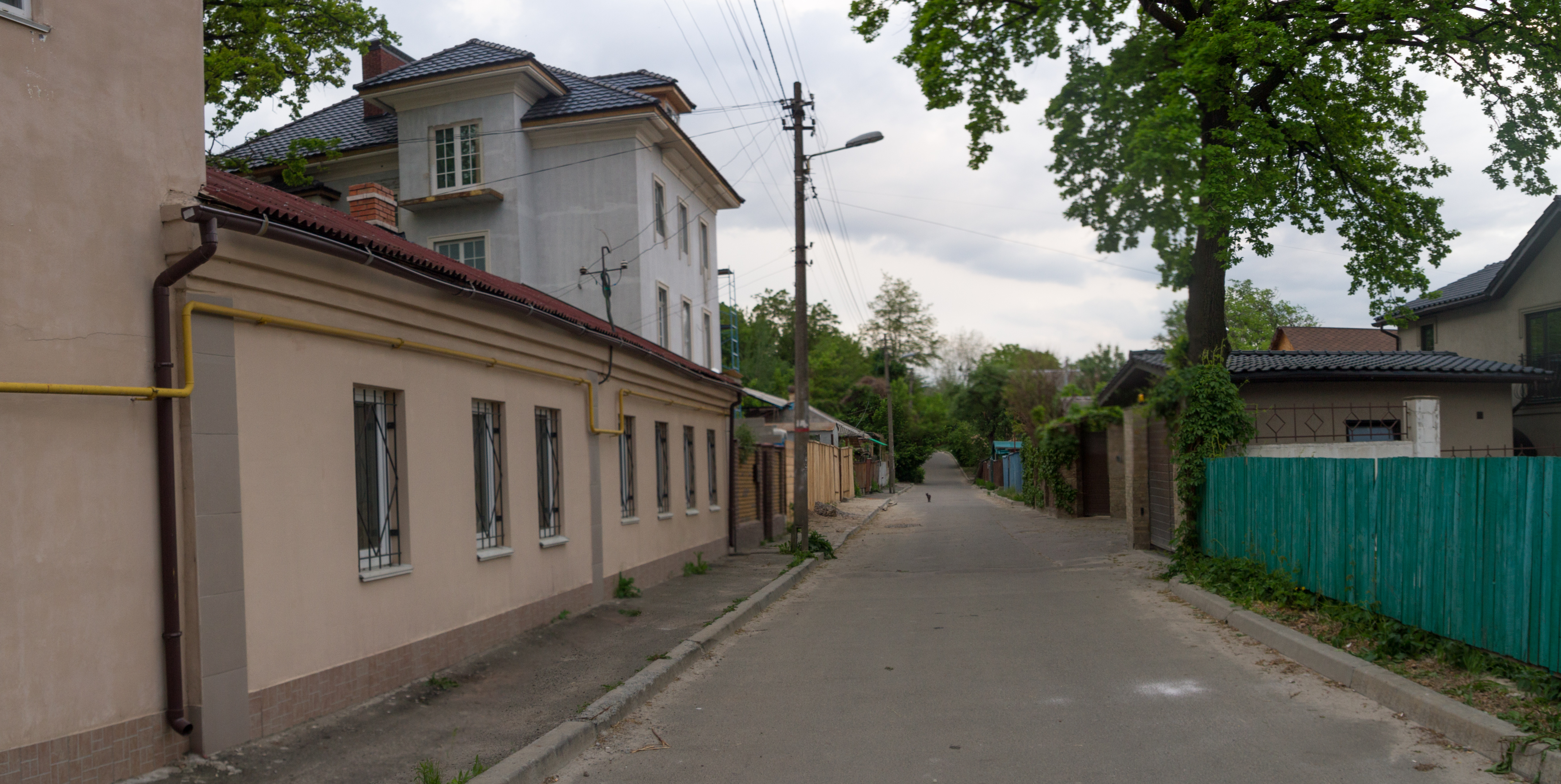
Kuchmyn Yar Street
