= Roman Ratushnyi =

Ukrainian activist and soldier

- Born: July 5, 1997; Kyiv, Ukraine
- Died: June 9, 2022 (aged 24); Sulyhivka, Izium Raion, Kharkiv Oblast, Ukraine

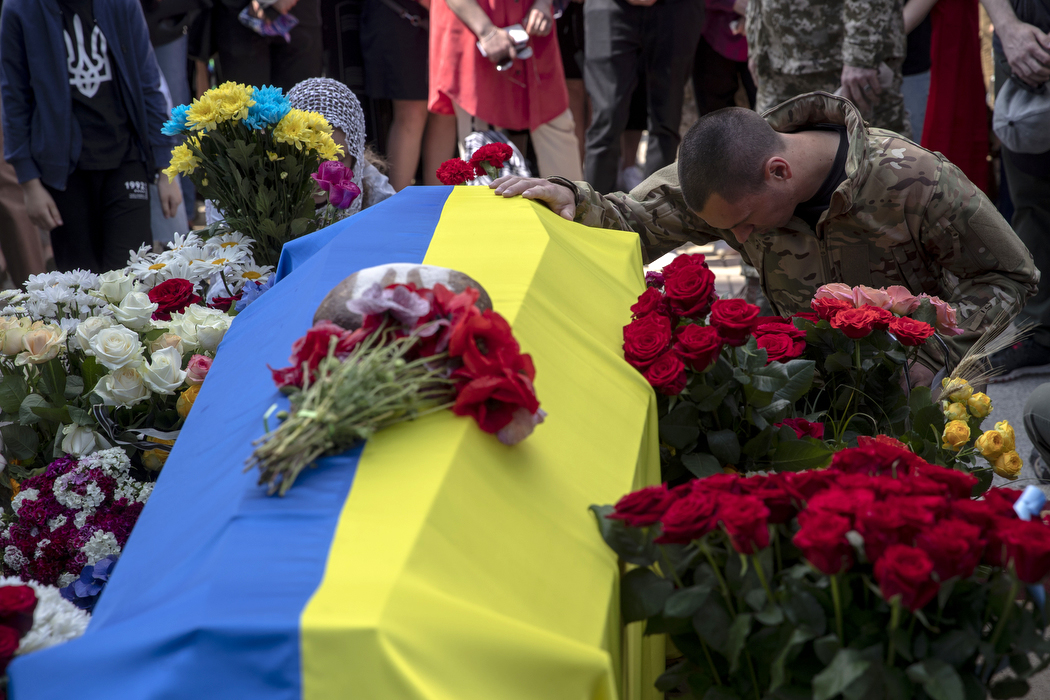
Roman Ratushnyi's funeral

Roman Tarasovych Ratushnyi (Ukrainian: Роман Тарасович Ратушний, call sign: Seneca; 5 July 1997 – 9 June 2022) was a Ukrainian journalist and public activist. Ratushnyi was one of the first participants in the 2014 "Revolution of Dignity". In 2018, he founded an initiative that fights against construction in the green zone of Protasiv Yar in Kyiv. When the Russian invasion of Ukraine began in 2022, Ratushnyi joined the Armed Forces of Ukraine. He died in Sulyhivka, a village near Izium, in June 2022.

== Biography ==
Roman Tarasovych Ratushnyi was born on July 5, 1997, in Kyiv, in the family of Taras Ratushnyi (activist of the "Save Old Kyiv" movement) and writer Svitlana Povalyaeva. In 2012, he entered the Financial and Legal College in Kyiv, where he obtained a higher legal education.

His elder brother, Vasyl Ratushnyi, a drone pilot, was killed by a drone on 27 February 2025.

=== Euromaidan ===
At the end of 2013, Roman took part in the Euromaidan, and was attacked with other students by Berkut on the night of November 30.

After Euromaidan, for some time, as a journalist, he worked on the project "Metro to Troyeschyna" about Kyiv officials, wrote about energy, about tenders with diesel fuel at Ukrzaliznytsia.

In December 2014, he actively participated in protests for personnel changes in the Ministry of Internal Affairs of Ukraine and speeding up investigations of crimes committed in 2013-2014 on Euromaidan and in Odesa.

In 2015, he created a map of the international relations between the Russian and Ukrainian mafia, based on public articles, records, and links, which included about one thousand people involved in criminal activities.

He supported the investigation of criminal activities and crimes committed by the Russian mafia. He was one of those who influenced the founding of the State Bureau of Investigation.

=== Protasiv Yar ===
In 2018, he headed the "Protect Protasiv Yar" initiative, and in 2019 – the public organization of the same name. The initiative is aimed at preserving the green zone in Protasovoy Yar in the center of Kyiv and preventing the development planned by Daytona Group LLC. Lawyer Yevgenia Zakrevska represented the interests of Roman Ratushnyi and the NGO "Protect Protasiv Yar" in court proceedings.

The conflict between local residents and the developer escalated in early May 2019, when the developer took down the fence and announced to the local community plans to build three 40-story buildings on the slope.

In October 2019, Roman Ratushnyi announced that he had been threatened with physical violence and published recordings of the corresponding dialogues with Andriy Smirnov, the Deputy Head of the Office of the President, later also by Gennady Korban. On this occasion, Town Hall appealed to the President of Ukraine Zelenskyy, as well as to the then Prosecutor General Ruslan Ryaboshapka, but criminal proceedings were not opened. Threats to the activist were never investigated. For some time he hid because of them, because he feared for his life.

Subsequently, the State Architectural and Building Inspection issued an order prohibiting the enterprise from continuing construction in the green zone, and on June 27, 2020, the Kyiv City Council returned the 3.15-hectare plot of land in Protasovoy Yar to the status of green spaces.

In November 2020, "Daytona Group" filed a lawsuit with a demand to annul the decision of the city authorities to return Protasovoy Yar to the status of a green zone that is not subject to development, and to declare its actions illegal. In April 2021, the District Administrative Court of Kyiv satisfied this lawsuit, but in September, the Court of Appeal overturned this decision and adopted a new one: to refuse to satisfy the administrative lawsuit.

On September 25, 2020, the District Administrative Court declared it illegal and canceled the permit for the construction of a residential-office-retail complex with a hotel and parking lot in Protasovoy Yar, issued to the companies "Daytona Group" and "Indbud". On January 4, 2022, the Administrative Court of Cassation recognized as legal the decision of the Kyiv City Council to ban construction in the Protasiv Yar park, putting an end to this case.

On July 14, 2022, the Kyiv City Council approved the decision to create a landscape park "Protasiv Yar" in memory of Roman Ratushnyi.

After Gennadiy Korban lost all the courts in his attempt to build Protasiv Yar, he appealed to the by then late activist Roman Ratushnyi and the "Protect Protasiv Yar" initiative with the demand to remove almost all references to himself, including threats, from their pages in social networks. The lawyers of the public initiative did not allow Roman Ratushnyi to be thrown out of the case after his death. Instead of the activist, his parents entered the case.

On March 23, 2023, the Kyiv Court of Appeal ruled in favor of the deceased activist Roman Ratushnyi and the Kyiv community in the case against businessman Gennadiy Korban, involved in Daytona Group LLC, who wanted to build Protasiv Yar.

As of July 2023, trials for unimpeded access to the territory of Protasovoy Yar are still ongoing.

=== Political and public activity ===
During the 2020 local elections, he ran for the Kyiv City Council of the IX convocation from the UDAR Vitaliy Klychka party, while not being a member of the party.

Roman was a participant in actions in support of imprisoned Odesa activist Serhiy Sternenko. After another campaign for Serhiy's birthday on March 20, 2021, Ratushnyi was sent under 24-hour house arrest by the decision of the Pechersk District Court on March 29. He was suspected of hooliganism. The evidence of the prosecutor's office was a photo in which Ratushnyi was allegedly recognized by witnesses. The photo is a black background and white dots on it. In social networks, the case has already been dubbed the "Case of Kazimir Malevich" with a reference to the artist's most famous painting "The Black Square".

=== Russian invasion of 2022 ===
After the beginning of the invasion of the Russian Federation into Ukraine, Ratushnyi, under the call sign "Seneca", became a volunteer in the ranks of the Defense Forces of Ukraine, created the "Protasovoy Yar" unit. He first defended Kyiv as the commander of a rapid response group of the DFTG together with units of the GUR and the SBU, later he operated in Sumy Oblast as part of the 93rd Mechanized Brigade deep in the occupied territories, thanks to Vlad "Snake" Sordu, becoming a member of the sabotage and intelligence command under the leadership of Dmytruk Bohdan Oleksandrovych. Took part in ambushes on columns of occupying troops, collection of operational information, and de-occupation of populated areas of the region.

Since the beginning of April, Ratushnyi fought in the Kharkiv region, in particular in the Izyum district, in the reconnaissance platoon of the 2nd motorized infantry battalion of the 93rd separate mechanized brigade of the Kholodny Yar Armed Forces.

He died in the battle near Izium on June 9, 2022, falling into an enemy ambush. Roman's father later reported that Roman died near the village of Sulyhivka.

The funeral service was held on June 18 in St. Michael's Cathedral, followed by a farewell on Independence Square (under the triumphal column of the Independence Monument). He was buried at Baikovo cemetery (plot 27a).

=== Awards ===
He received the Order "For Courage" of the III degree (2022, posthumously) - for personal courage and selfless actions shown in the defense of the state sovereignty and territorial integrity of Ukraine, loyalty to the military oath.

=== Commemoration ===
The "Novynarnya" publication announced the creation of the "Roman Ratushnyi Premium Fund" for increased fees for reporting on those who take part in the Russian-Ukrainian war on the side of Ukraine. The fund was created from funds transferred by Roman's mother, Svitlana Povalyaeva, which came to her from benefactors as a reaction to his death.

On June 17, 2022, an electronic petition was registered to award Roman Ratushnyi the title of Hero of Ukraine posthumously, and on August 1, it received the necessary 25,000 votes.

On July 4, 2022, the President of the European Commission, Ursula von der Leyen, commemorated Ratushnyi in her speech at the Ukraine Recovery Conference:

One month ago, a young Ukrainian hero died on the battlefield, as he fought for the future of his country. His name was Roman Ratushnyi, and he would have turned 25 tomorrow. Roman belonged to a new generation of young Ukrainians. As a teenager, he was among the first protesters on the Maidan, demonstrating for Europe and for democracy. And ever since, Roman never stopped fighting for a better Ukraine. He fought for a corruption-free Ukraine, both as activist and journalist. He fought for a greener Ukraine, leading the movement to save a natural park in Kyiv from illegal constructions financed by oligarchs. He fought for a sovereign Ukraine, and paid the ultimate price for it. Roman's life was taken too early, but his dream lives on. The dream of a new Ukraine, not only free, democratic and European, but also fair, green and prosperous. A place that Ukraine's golden generation can finally feel their own. It is this dream that brings us here today.

On July 8, 2022, the mass media reported that in honor of Ratushnyi at the Institute of Law of KNU named after Shevchenko established a scholarship program for public activists pursuing legal education. The scholarship is financed by international and Ukrainian law firms.

On July 14, 2022, the Kyiv City Council supported the decision to create a landscape reserve on the territory of Protasovoy Yar. The customer will be created on both sides of the ravine.

"The creation of the nature reserve is a tribute to the memory of Roman Ratushnyi and evidence that his work and the work of many Kyivans who fought for this green zone was not in vain," commented Kyiv Mayor Vitaliy Klychko.

At the beginning of September 2022, on the initiative of the commander of the communications platoon of the 2nd Motorized Infantry Battalion, senior Sergeant Vlad Sord, and the commander of the 93rd OMBr "Kholodny Yar", colonel Shevchuk Ruslan Mykolayovych, an innovative special purpose reconnaissance platoon was formed, named after Roman's call sign - "Seneca". By 2023, the formation had expanded to a combined intelligence company with an experimental structure for the Armed Forces and consisted of a command staff, a flight control center, a platoon of multi-rotor UAVs, a platoon of BPAK of the "wing" type, a platoon of radio technical intelligence, a development service, a department of FPV drones, a department improvised explosive devices, MTZ service and medical service, which made it possible to work autonomously, regardless of the 93 OMBr, and extremely efficiently. According to the commander of the consolidated company, the body performs combat tasks based on the principles of "maximum efficiency - minimum risk" and "the life of a Ukrainian is more valuable than a lost robot", and the very idea of the technological structure is attributed to Roman together with Sord. The basis was a part of the fighters of the informal unit "Protasiv Yar", who fought under the command of Roman in the Kyiv region and together with him became part of the 2 MPB 93 OMBr, as well as public activists and active youth mobilized with the assistance of the Lobby X initiative, inspired by the life path and ideals of Ratushnyi.

On May 27, 2023, the "Protasiv Yar" festival in memory of Roman Ratushnyi began in Kyiv. Every two Saturdays until September, there will be lectures, talks, and events that will popularize human rights initiatives, Ukrainian history, modern and traditional art, and preserve the memory of Roman Ratushnyi.

On November 23, 2023, by the decision of the Kyiv City Council, the landscape reserve of local importance "Protasiv Yar" was named after the Ukrainian defender and activist Roman Ratushnyi.

On December 13, 2023, citizens planted a 12-year-old oak tree in the Shevchenko district of Kyiv in memory of Roman Ratushnyi, but on the night of December 15, it was cut down by unknown persons. According to the press officer of the Shevchenkivsky district police department of the city of Kyiv, proceedings have been opened for the specified fact under Part 4 of Art. 185 of the Criminal Code of Ukraine (Theft).

==== Streets ====
In the capital, the former Volgogradska street in Solomianskyi District was renamed to Roman Ratushnyi Street. Such a proposal was submitted by the writer Evgeny Lear. In Mena, Chernihiv Oblast, Vatutina Street was renamed Roman Ratushnyi Street.

== Legacy ==
Ratushnyi became a personification of the generation of young Ukrainians who profess democratic values. Roman Ratushnyi and all young fallen warriors of Ukraine were nominated for the IFLRY Freedom Award 2022.

A street in Kyiv was renamed in his honor; over 30,000 people voted in support of the decision. The petition with the appeal to award him with the title of Hero of Ukraine has gathered the necessary 25,000 signatures. In July 2022, the Kyiv City Council supported the decision to create a landscape reserve on both slopes of Protasiv Yar in Kyiv. In the summer of 2023, the Protasiv Yar festival was held in Protasiv Yar Park in honor of Roman Ratushnyi. An annual scholarship in his name was established to assist community activists in pursuing legal education.

Ratushnyi's mother, Svitlana Povaliaeva, said that her son had bequeathed to financially support the Shevchenko Museum and the Maiboroda National Bandura Chapel.
