= Vidradnyi =

Neighbourhood in Kyiv, Ukraine

Coordinates: 50°25′53″N 30°25′18″E

Vidradnyi (Ukrainian: Відрадний) is a neighbourhood in Kyiv, Ukraine. It belongs to Solomianskyi Raion (district) of Kyiv.

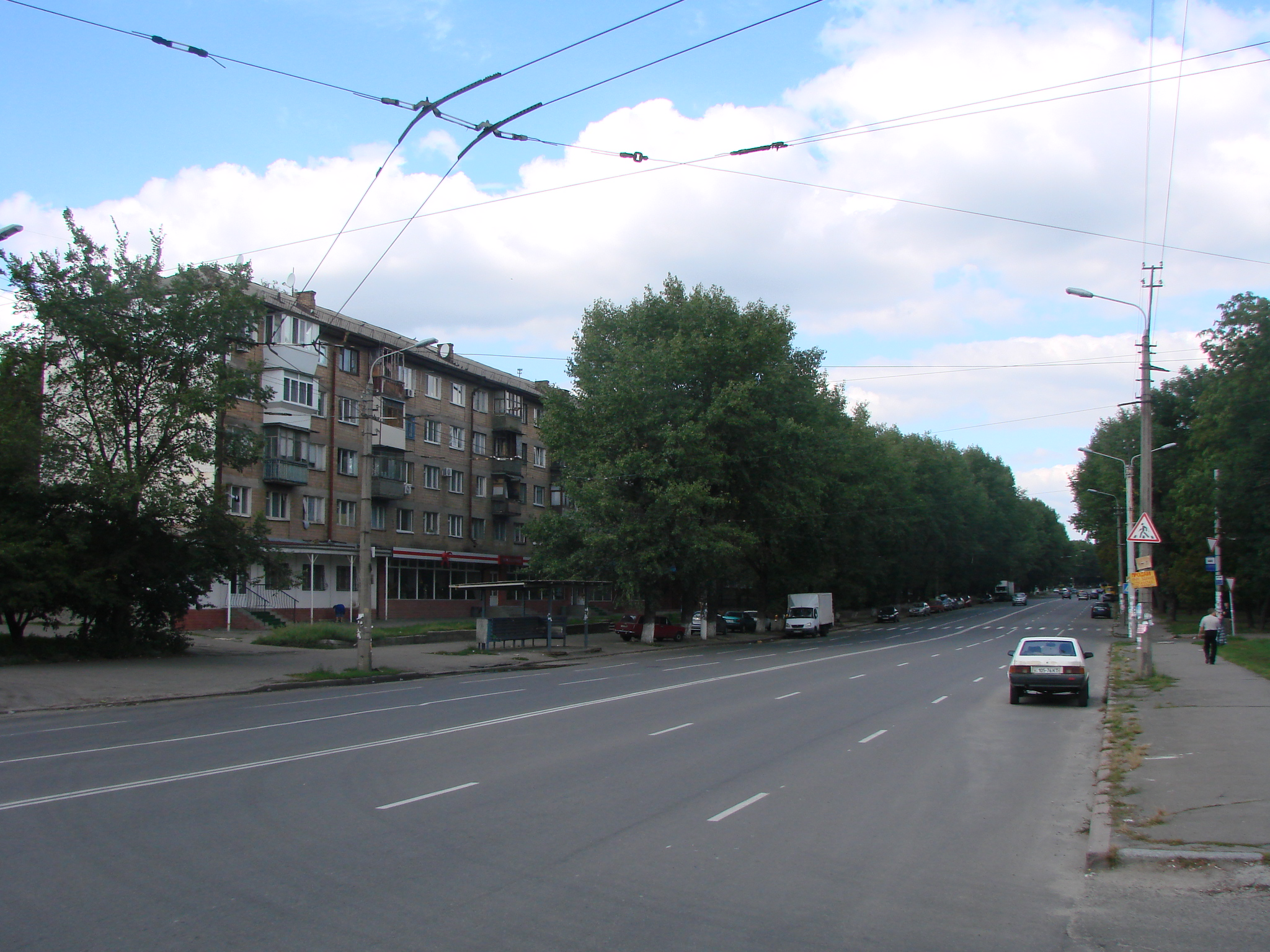
Vidradnyi Avenue in Kyiv

The name Vidradnyi is derived from the khutor with the same name, that has been one of the Kyiv's suburbs in the beginning of the 20th century.
