= Protasiv Yar (ski complex) =

Ski complex close to the downtown of Kyiv, Ukraine

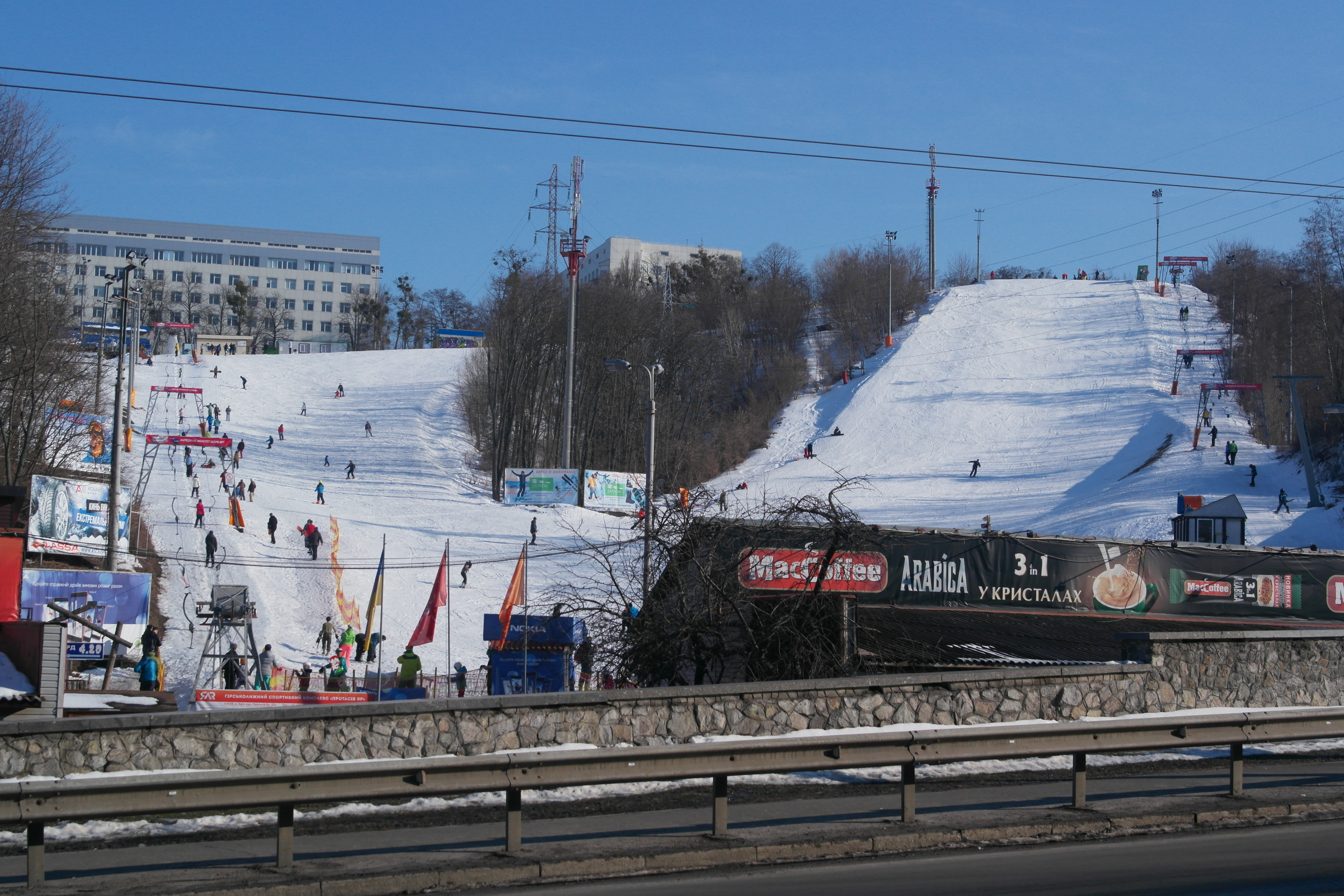
- Interactive map of Protasiv Yar
- Location: Kyiv Hills
- Nearest city: Kyiv
- Coordinates: 50.424194°N 30.499236°E
- Trails: 3
- Longest run: 500 m (1,600 ft)
- Lift system: 2 (ski tow)
- Terrain parks: snowboard park
- Night skiing: Sat 22:30 - 04:00

Protasiv Yar (Ukrainian: Протасів Яр) is a ski complex close to the downtown of Kyiv, Ukraine. It is self-administered and was given a special status as the center for Olympic preparations.

There are several pistes and some with light for night skiing. There is snowmaking available if little or no snow is present. For snowboarding Protasiv Yar has a special snowboarding park.

Also equipment rental and a small cafe are open for winter sports lovers.
