= Solomianskyi District =

Coordinates: 50.4500°N 30.5233°E

Solomianskyi District Солом'янський район
- Urban district in Kyiv
- Flag Coat of arms

- Country: Ukraine
- Municipality: Kyiv Municipality

Area
  - Total: 40.05 km^{2} (15.46 sq mi)

Population
  - Total: 280,400
  - Density: 7,000/km^{2} (18,000/sq mi)
- Time zone: UTC+2 (EET)
  - Summer (DST): UTC+3 (EEST)
- Website: http://solor.gov.ua/

The Solomianskyi District (Note: Ukrainian: Соло́м'янський райо́н, romanized: Solómʺyansʹkyi raión, IPA: [soˈlɔmjɐnʲsʲkɪj rɐˈjɔn]) is a district in Kyiv, the capital of Ukraine. Located in the western part of the city, in the basin of Lybid river, Dniepr's tributary. Named after village of Solomianka that became part of Kyiv in 1858. Established as a district in 1921. Reogarnized in 2001. An area of the district was settled since the Middle Ages. The so-called Batyieva Hora (mistakenly identified with Batu Khan who invaded Kyiv in 1240) is located within the district.

== Population ==
=== Language ===
Distribution of the population by native language according to the 2001 census:

Language	Number	Percentage
Ukrainian	190 165	67.51%
Russian	85 809	30.47%
Other (Note: Those who did not indicate their native language or indicated a language that was native to less than 1% of the local population.)	5 690	2.02%
Total	281 664	100.00%

== Neighbourhoods ==
- Hrushky (Грушки) — hamlet of the 19th century. During 1871–1902 it belonged to nobleman K. Hrushko (hence got its name).
- Karavaievi Dachi (Караваєві Дачі, "Karavaiev's cottages") — area of border outposts outside of Kyiv in the XII—XIII c. In 1872 it was purchased by Russian doctor Vladimir Karavayev.
- Vidradnyi Відрадний
- Shuliavka (Шулявка) — mentioned under 1146 in the Hypatian Codex. In the 18th century this area was a residence of the Orthodox metropolitan bishops of Kyiv.
- Batyieva Hora (Батиєва Гора) - former village, now historical neighbourhood, where Batyievi caves, remains of the Zarubyntsi culture, were found

== Education ==
- Ihor Sikorskyi Kyiv Polytechnic Institute

== Gallery ==
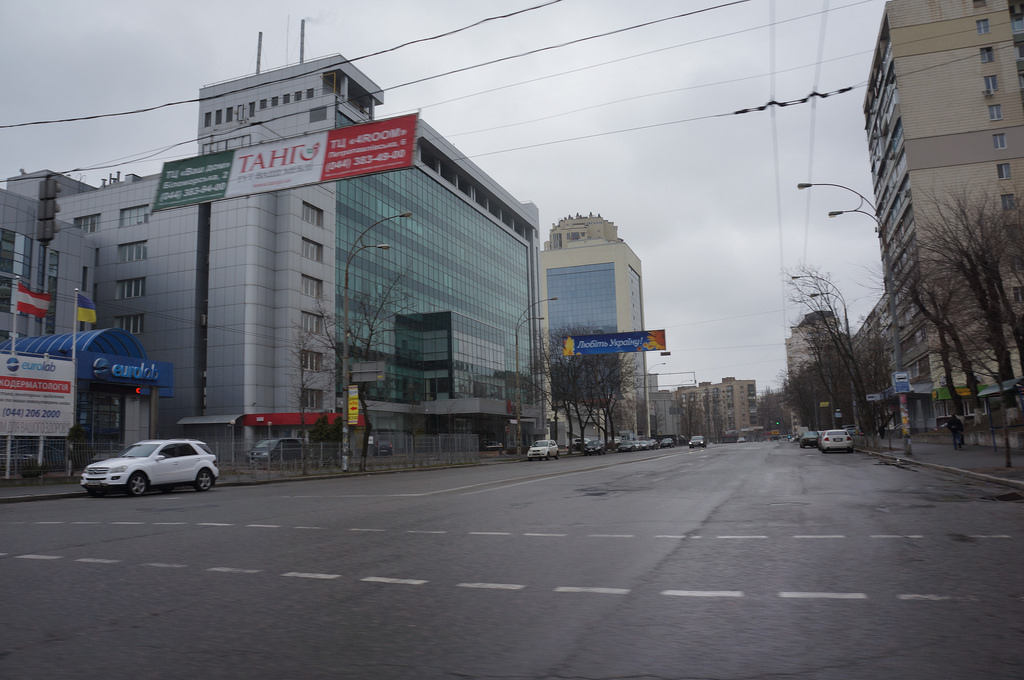
Solomianska Street looking east

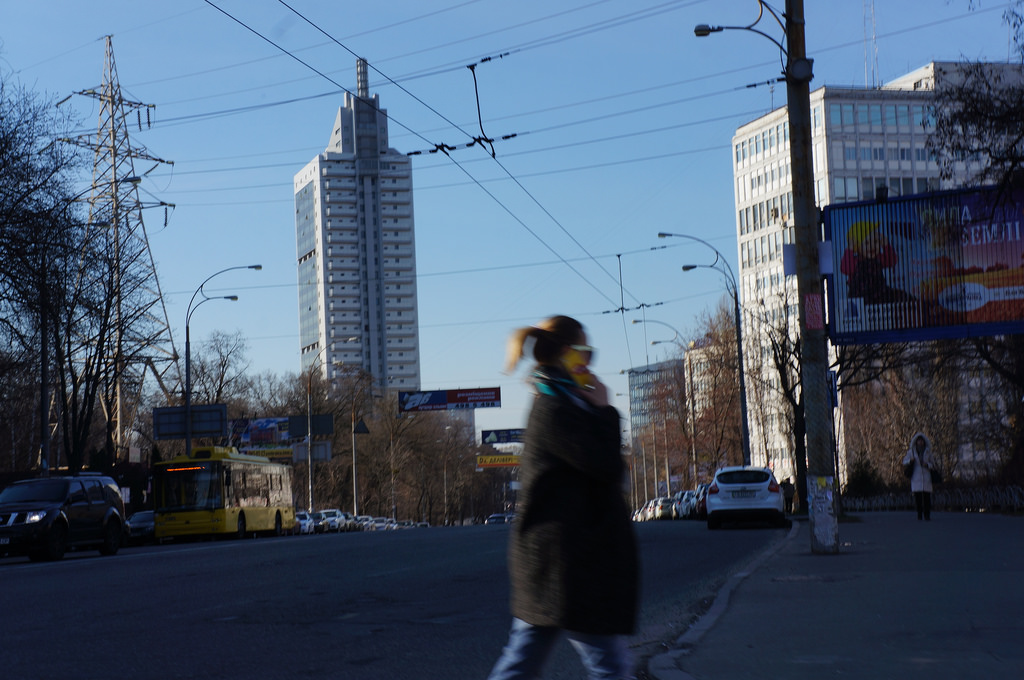
Solomianska street, with the Kyiv Court of Appeals building in the background

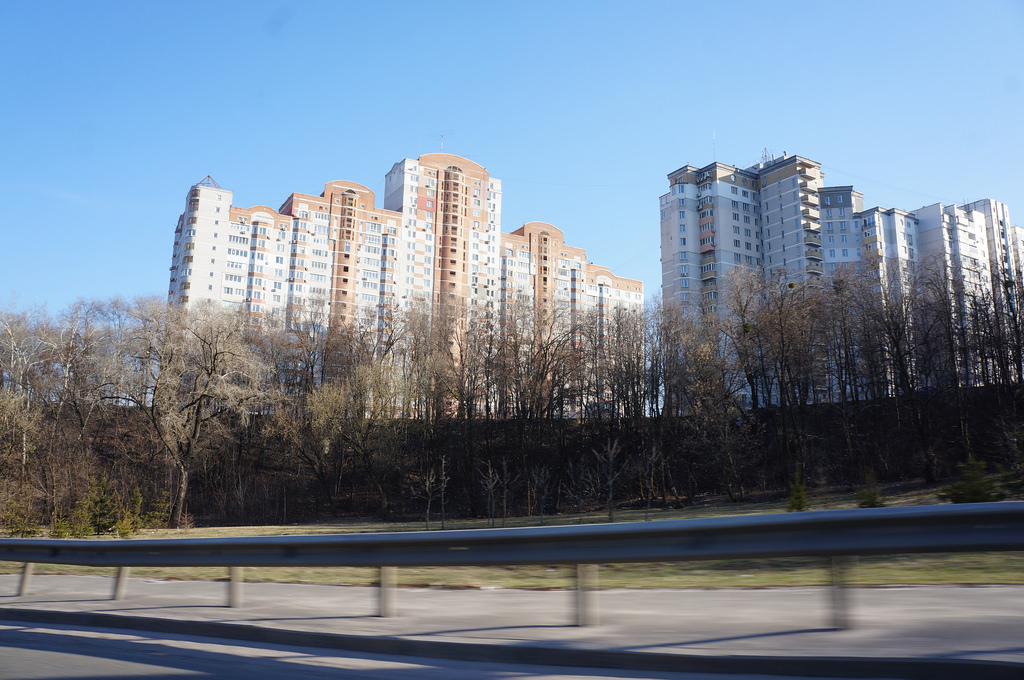
Protasiv Yar Street

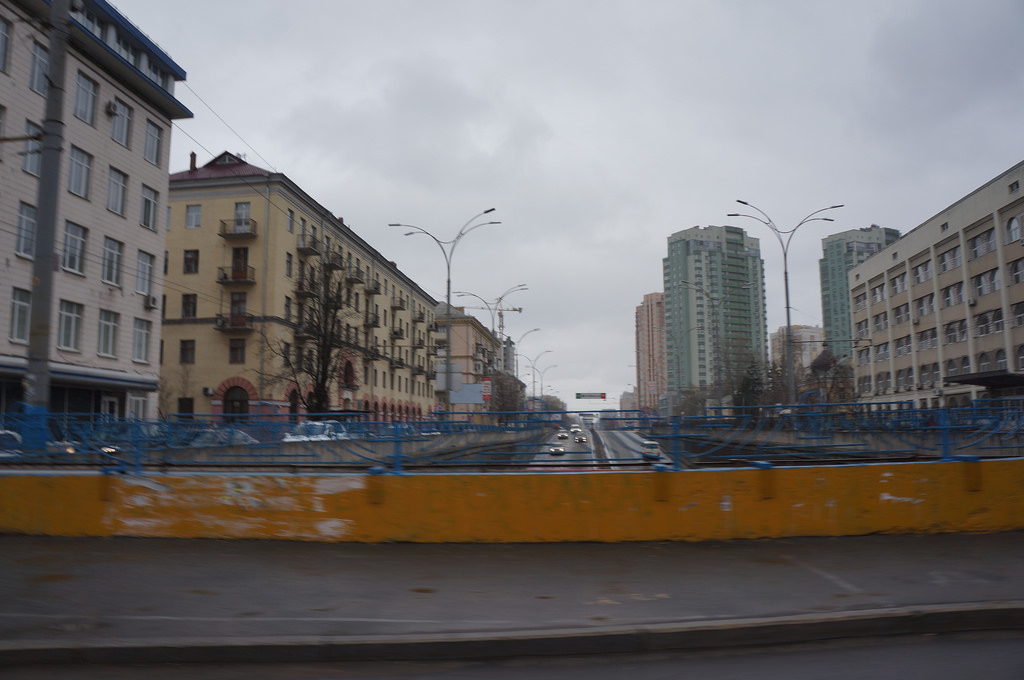
Traffic junction at Sevastopolska Square
