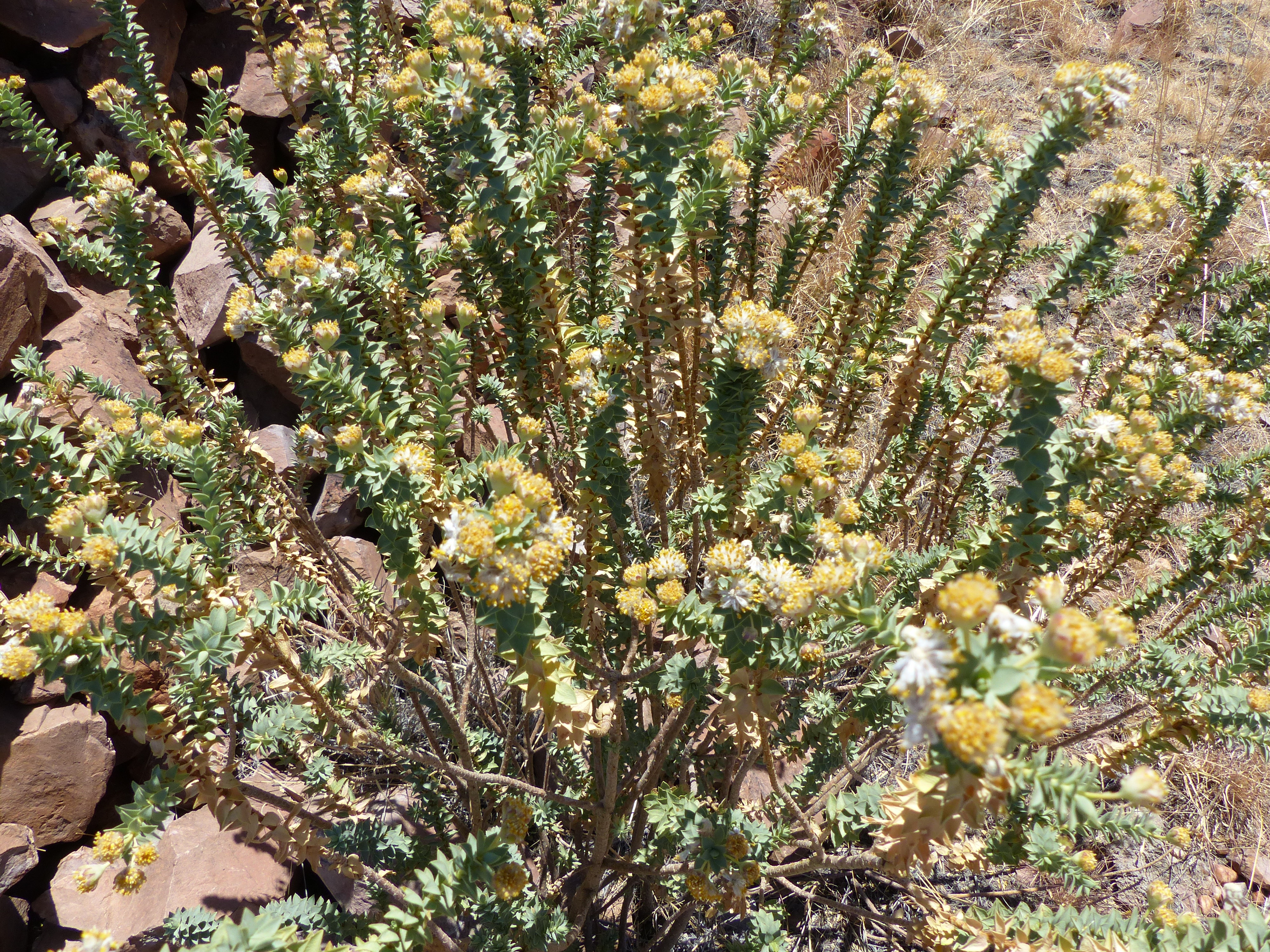

Conservation status
- Critically Endangered (IUCN 3.1)

Scientific classification
- Kingdom: Plantae
- Clade: Tracheophytes
- Clade: Angiosperms
- Clade: Eudicots
- Clade: Asterids
- Order: Asterales
- Family: Asteraceae
- Genus: Euryops
- Species: E. walterorum

Binomial name
- Euryops walterorum Merxm.

= Euryops walterorum =

Species of flowering plant

Euryops walterorum is a species of plant in the family Asteraceae that is endemic to Namibia. It is a critically endangered species found only on the plateau of Gamsberg Mountain.

== Taxonomy and history ==
The first herbarium specimens of Euryops walterorum were collected in 1891, but it would not be formally described until 1955. Hermann Merxmüller named this new species in honour of German botanists Erna and Heinrich Walter.

== Distribution and habitat ==
Euryops walterorum is known only from the summit plateau of Gamsberg Mountain, where it grows in clay soils at altitudes of 2,000–2,334 m (6,562–7,657 ft). Its entire range lies within the privately-owned protected area Gamsberg Nature Reserve. It grows in the shrublands along the northern, eastern, and southern parts of the plateau, but is not found in the central grasslands.

== Description ==
Euryops walterorum is an erect shrub growing to 2 m (6 ft 7 in) tall. The stems are covered with brownish or grey bark and are mostly hairless. The stiff, leathery leaves are broadly lanceolate to ovate or obovate in shape and measure 10–15 mm (0.39–0.59 in) by 5–7 mm (0.20–0.28 in). Conspicuous hairs give the leaves a rough texture. The flower heads are bowl shaped, lacking ray florets, and measure 4–9 mm (0.16–0.35 in) in diameter.

== Conservation status ==
Euryops walterorum is listed as critically endangered on the International Union for the Conservation of Nature's Red List under criteria A2ace, A4ace, and B1ab(i,ii,iii,v) due to declines in its population and habitat. Though once locally abundant, recurring droughts and increasing temperatures due to climate change have resulted in high mortality and drastically reduced the population of E. walterorum, with a 2025 Red List assessment estimating that the population was reduced by 81.28–82.5% in the 37 year period between 1980 and 2017. Other threats include soil erosion, wildfires, and an increase in foot traffic on the plateau as a result of the construction of the Africa Millimetre Telescope.
