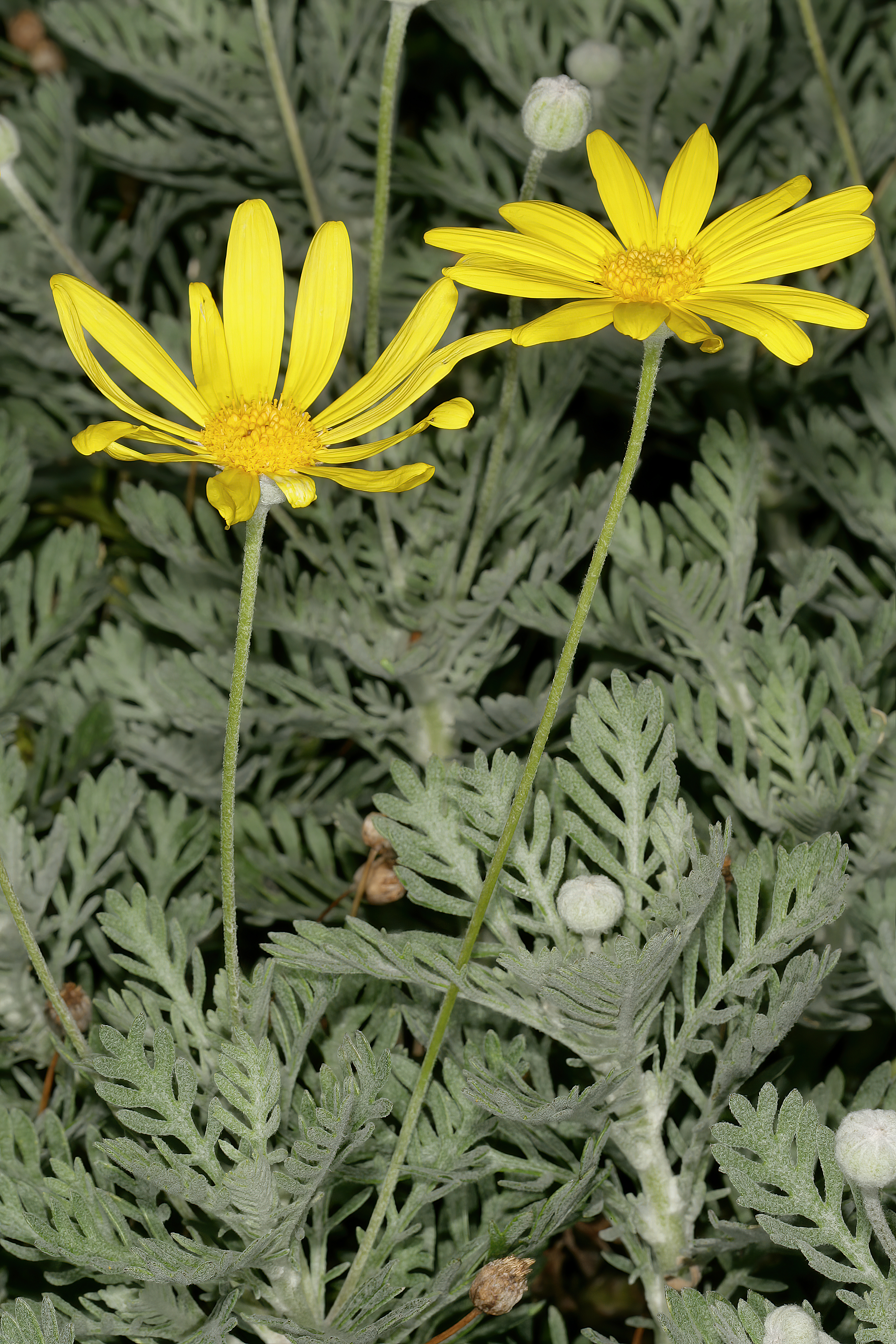
- Virides flowers

Scientific classification
- Kingdom: Plantae
- Clade: Tracheophytes
- Clade: Angiosperms
- Clade: Eudicots
- Clade: Asterids
- Order: Asterales
- Family: Asteraceae
- Genus: Euryops
- Species: E. pectinatus

Binomial name
- Euryops pectinatus (L.) Cass.

= Euryops pectinatus =

Species of flowering plant

Euryops pectinatus, the grey-leaved euryops, is a species of flowering plant in the family Asteraceae, endemic to rocky, sandstone slopes in the Western Cape of South Africa (from Gifberg to the Cape Peninsula).

== Description ==
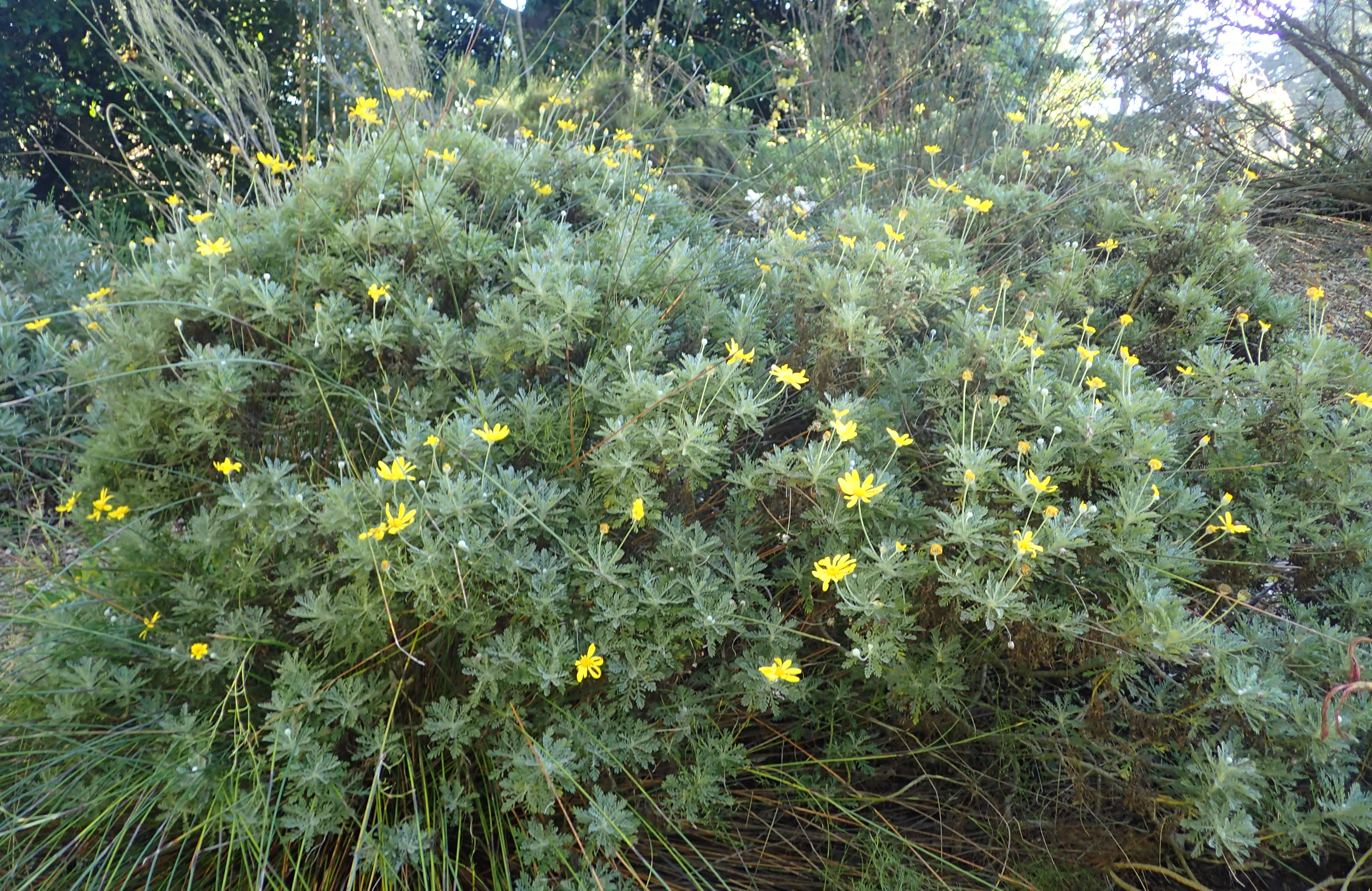
Mature shrub

It is a vigorous evergreen shrub growing to 2 m (6 ft 7 in) tall and wide, with silvery green, hairy leaves and yellow, daisy-like composite flowers 5 cm (2 in) in diameter. They bloom from early summer through to autumn and into winter in areas with mild climates.

The fruits bear a single seed and are either hairless or covered in myxogenic (slime-producing) hairs, and may also be topped by a pappus of white or brown bristles.

The Latin specific epithet pectinatus means “comb-like”, possibly referring to the deeply-divided, fernlike leaves.

== Cultivation ==
Euryops pectinatus is widely used as a garden plant, especially in urban areas and due to its almost perpetual flowering regime. It grows best in full sun and well-drained deep soils. It must be grown in a sheltered location, away from frost-prone areas. It has gained the Royal Horticultural Society's Award of Garden Merit.

== Gallery ==
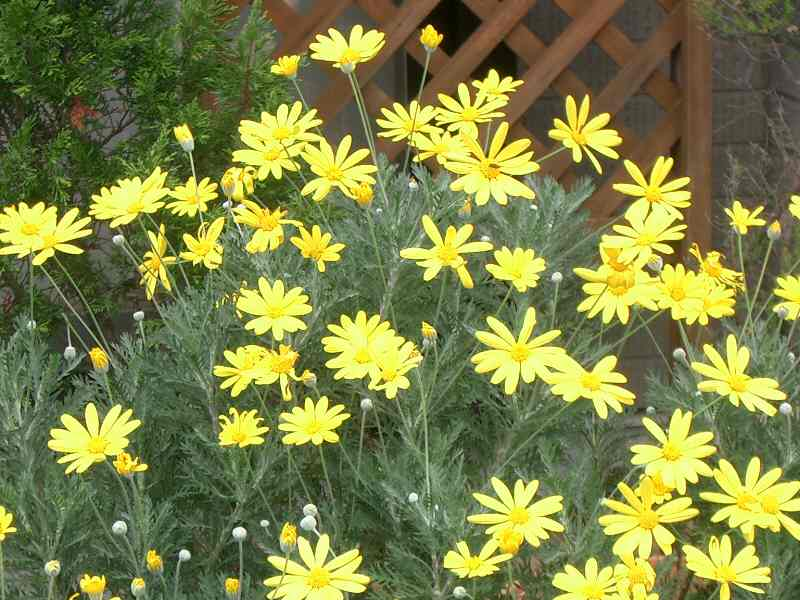
In full bloom

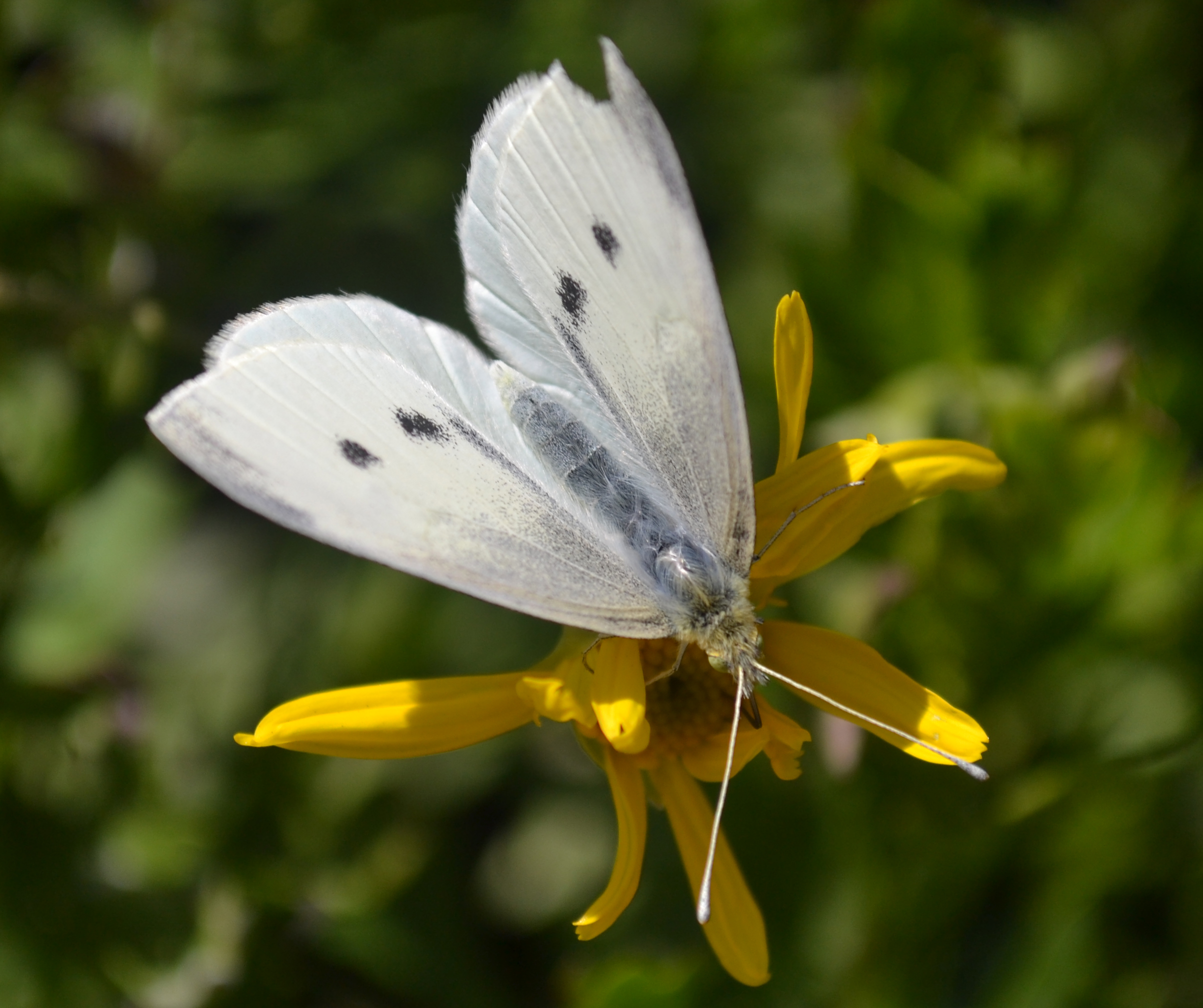
Pollinated by Cabbage White

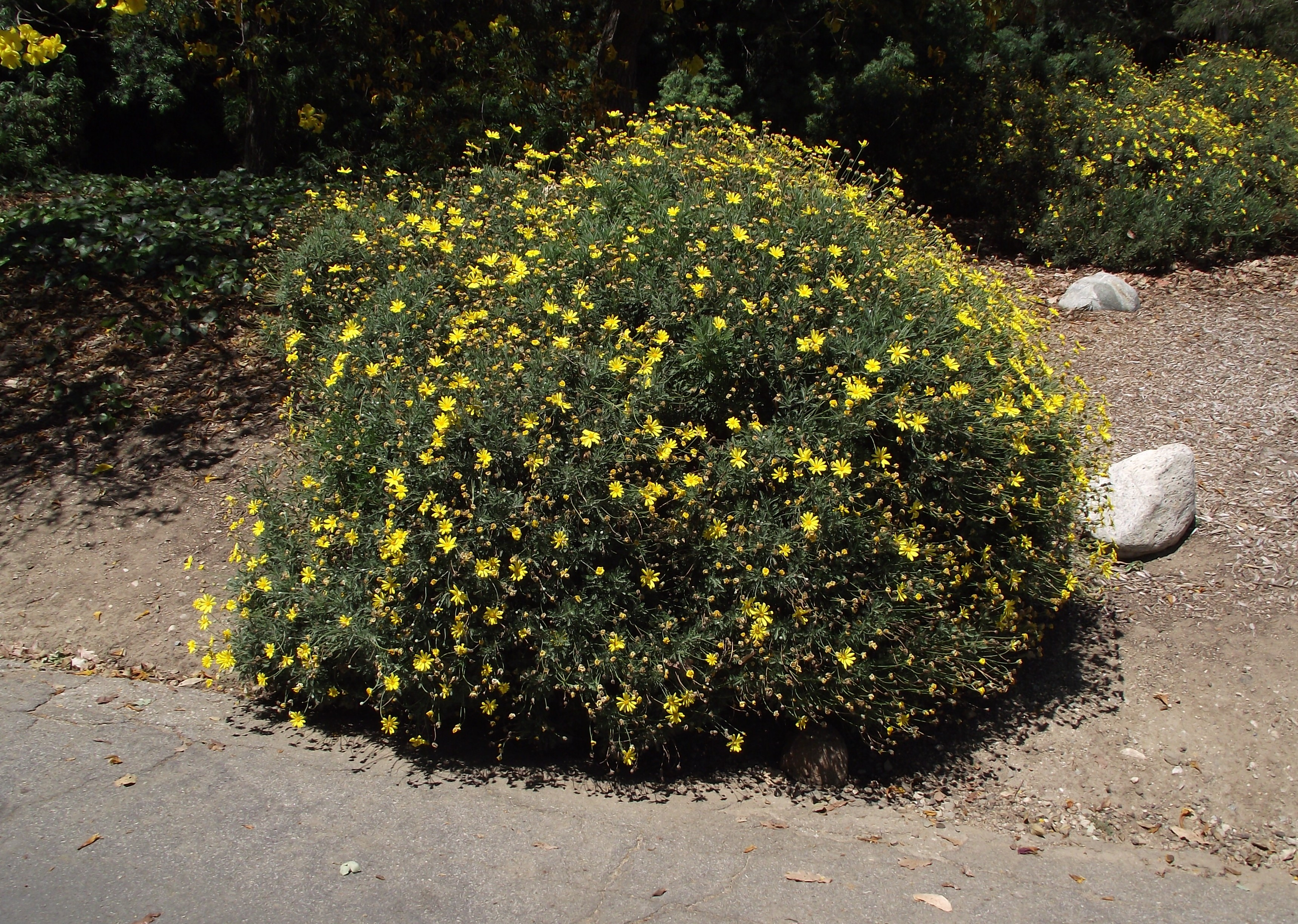
A shrub

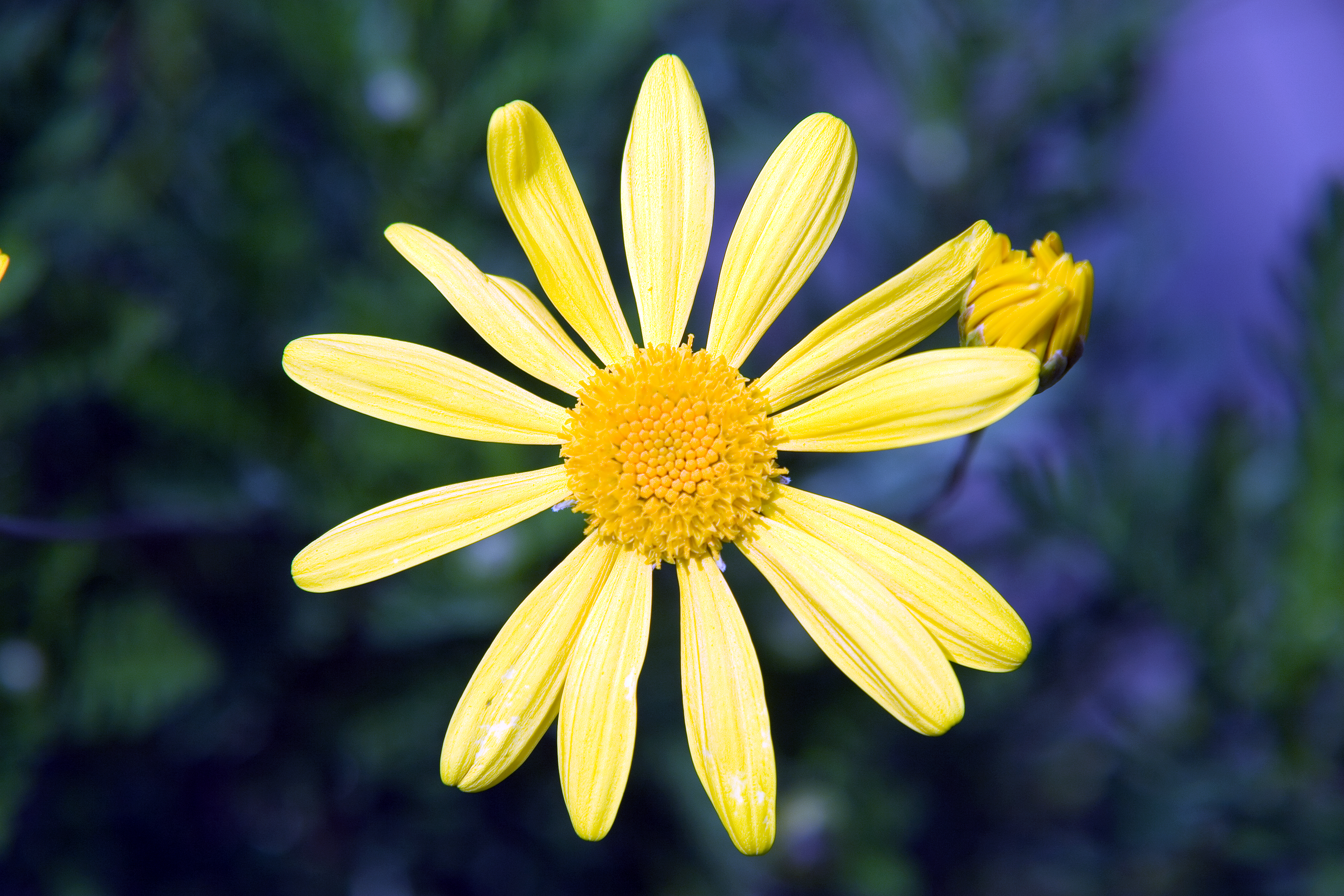
Flower close-up

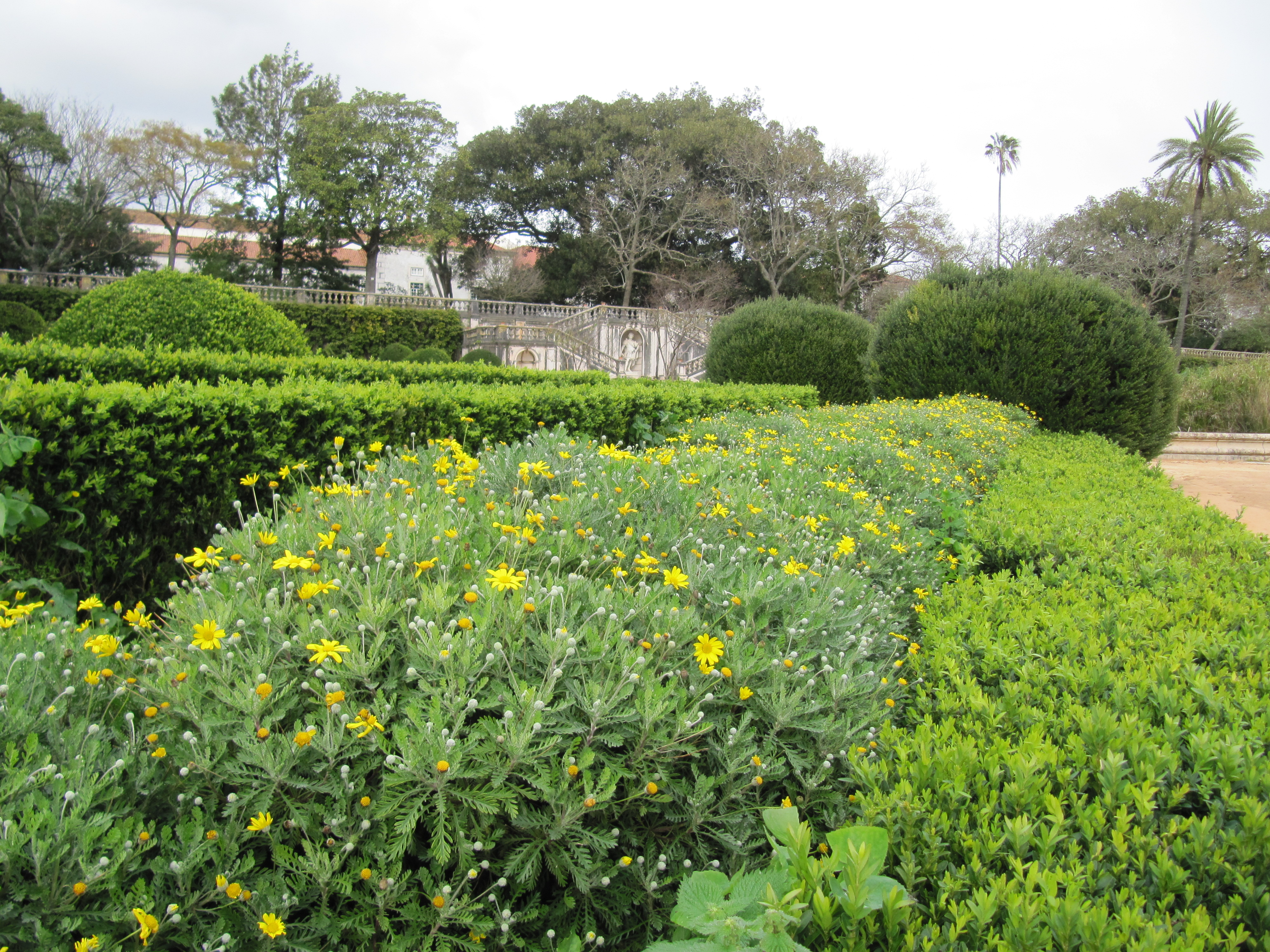
Hedge
