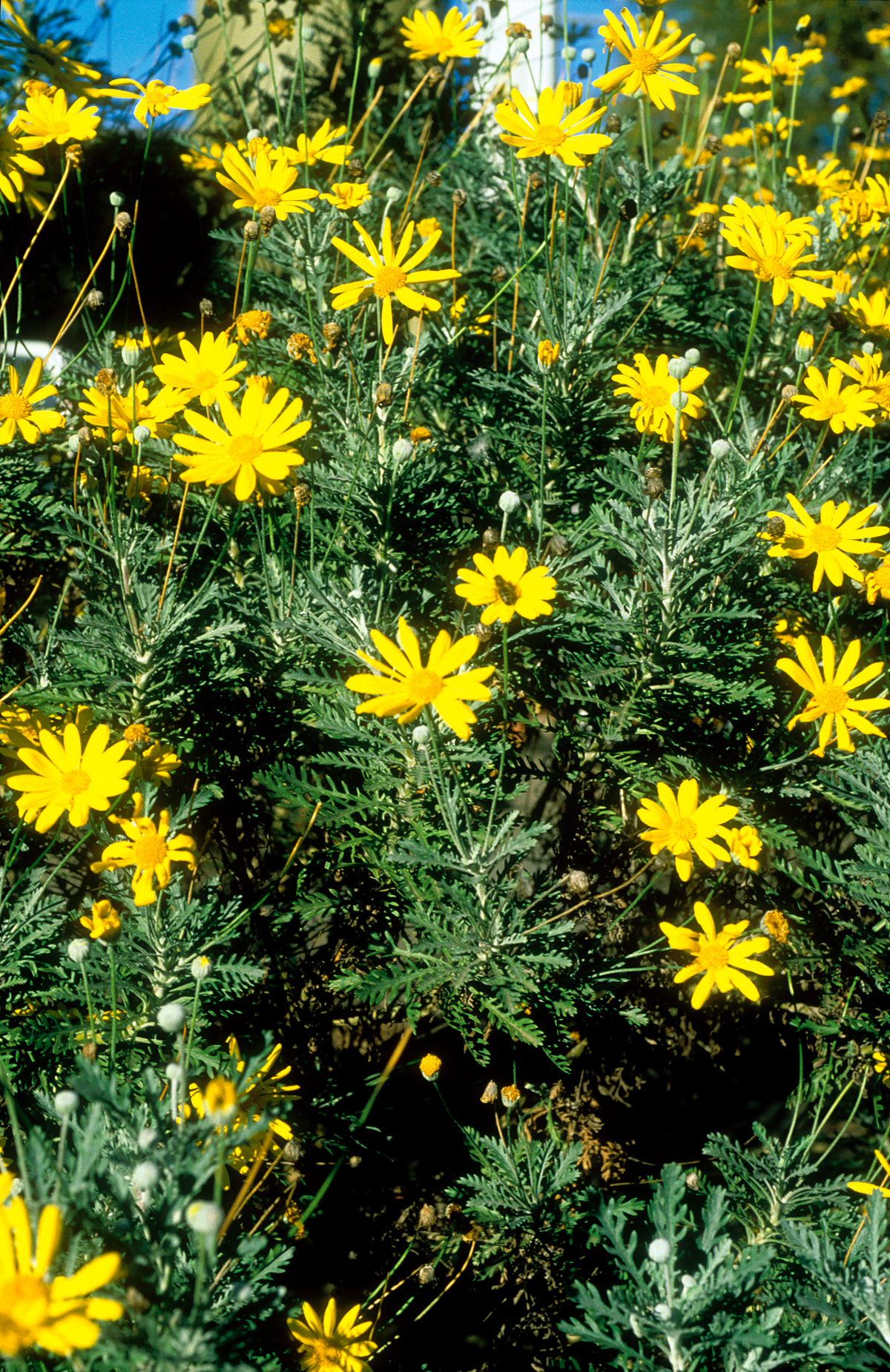
- Euryops pectinatus

Scientific classification
- Kingdom: Plantae
- Clade: Embryophytes
- Clade: Tracheophytes
- Clade: Spermatophytes
- Clade: Angiosperms
- Clade: Eudicots
- Clade: Asterids
- Order: Asterales
- Family: Asteraceae
- Subfamily: Asteroideae
- Tribe: Senecioneae
- Genus: Euryops (Cass.) Cass.

Synonyms
- Othonna subg. Euryops Cass.; Lasiocoma Bolus; Thodaya Compton; Enantiotrichum E.Mey. ex DC.; Ruckeria DC.; Caraea Hochst. ex Hochst.; Gamolepis as used by numerous authors, not Less. 1832; Lysichlamys Compton

= Euryops =

Genus of flowering plants

Euryops is a genus of flowering plants in the sunflower family. They are native mostly to rocky sites in southern Africa, with a few species in other parts of Africa and on the Arabian Peninsula. They produce daisy-like flowerheads from fern-like foliage. The name Euryops is probably a contraction of the Greek words ευρυς (eurys) meaning 'wide,' and ὄψις (opsis) meaning 'eye,' possibly referring to the large flowerheads compared to the narrow leaves.

Species

- Euryops abrotanifolius
- Euryops acraeus
- Euryops algoensis
- Euryops annae
- Euryops annuus
- Euryops anthemoides
- Euryops antinorii
- Euryops arabicus
- Euryops asparagoides
- Euryops bolusii
- Euryops brachypodus
- Euryops brevilobus
- Euryops brevipapposus
- Euryops brevipes
- Euryops brownei
- Euryops calvescens
- Euryops candollei
- Euryops chrysanthemoides
- Euryops ciliatus
- Euryops cuneatus
- Euryops dacrydioides
- Euryops decipiens
- Euryops decumbens
- Euryops dentatus
- Euryops discoideus
- Euryops dregeanus
- Euryops dyeri
- Euryops elgonensis
- Euryops empetrifolius
- Euryops erectus
- Euryops ericifolius
- Euryops ericoides
- Euryops euryopoides
- Euryops evansii
- Euryops floribundus
- Euryops galpinii
- Euryops gilfillanii
- Euryops glutinosus
- Euryops gracilipes
- Euryops hebecarpus
- Euryops hypnoides
- Euryops imbricatus
- Euryops indecorus
- Euryops inops
- Euryops integrifolius
- Euryops jaberiana
- Euryops jacksonii
- Euryops lasiocladus
- Euryops lateriflorus
- Euryops latifolius
- Euryops laxus
- Euryops leiocarpus
- Euryops linearis
- Euryops linifolia
- Euryops linifolius
- Euryops longipes
- Euryops marlothii
- Euryops microphyllus
- Euryops mirus
- Euryops montanus
- Euryops mucosus
- Euryops muirii
- Euryops multifidus
- Euryops multiflorus
- Euryops munitus
- Euryops namaquensis
- Euryops namibensis
- Euryops nodosus
- Euryops othonnoides
- Euryops pectinatus
- Euryops pedunculatus
- Euryops petraeus
- Euryops pinifolius
- Euryops pinnatipartitus
- Euryops pleiodontus
- Euryops polytrichoides
- Euryops prostratus
- Euryops rehmannii
- Euryops rosulatus
- Euryops rupestris
- Euryops serra
- Euryops spathaceus
- Euryops speciosissimus
- Euryops subcarnosus
- Euryops sulcatus
- Euryops tagetoides
- Euryops tenuilobus
- Euryops tenuissimus
- Euryops thunbergii
- Euryops transvaalensis
- Euryops trifidus
- Euryops trilobus
- Euryops tysonii
- Euryops ursinoides
- Euryops vimineus
- Euryops virgatus
- Euryops virgineus
- Euryops wageneri
- Euryops walterorum
- Euryops zeyheri

Gallery

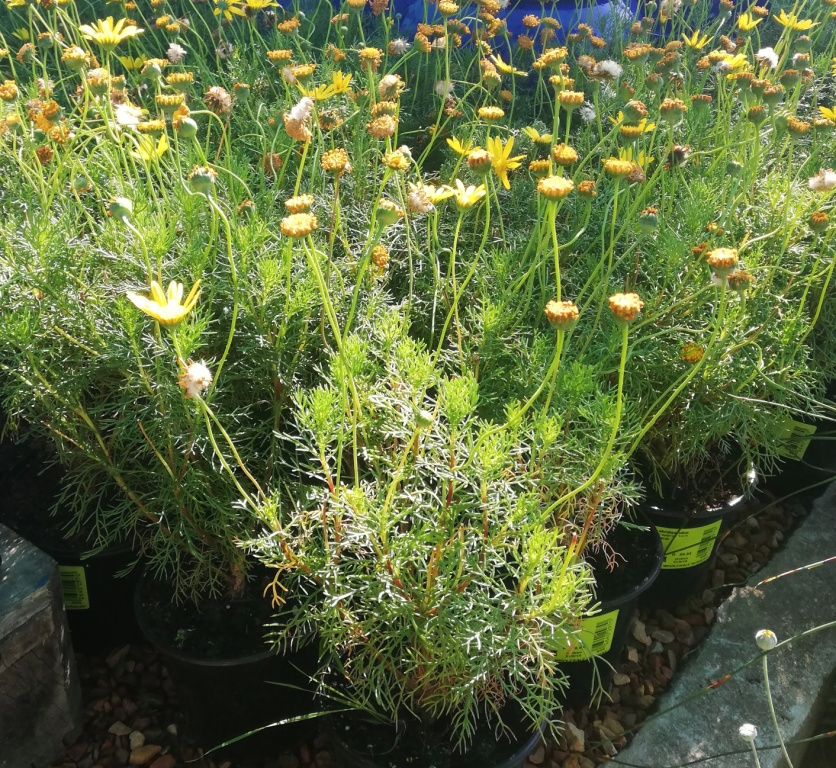
Euryops abrotanifolius, Western Cape, South Africa

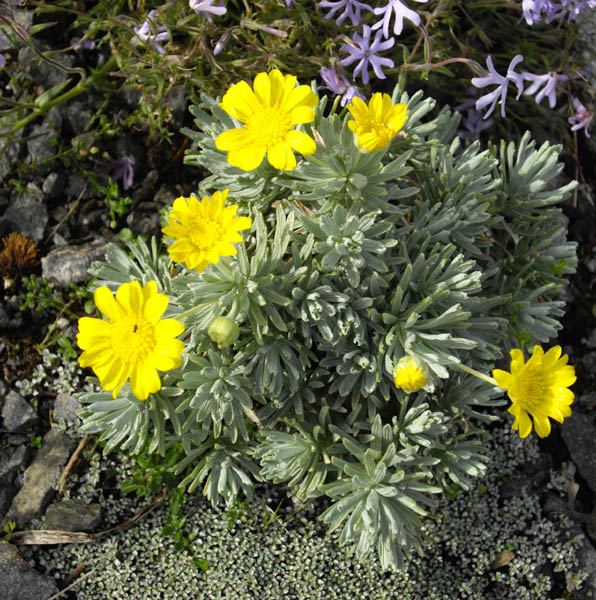
Euryops acraeus

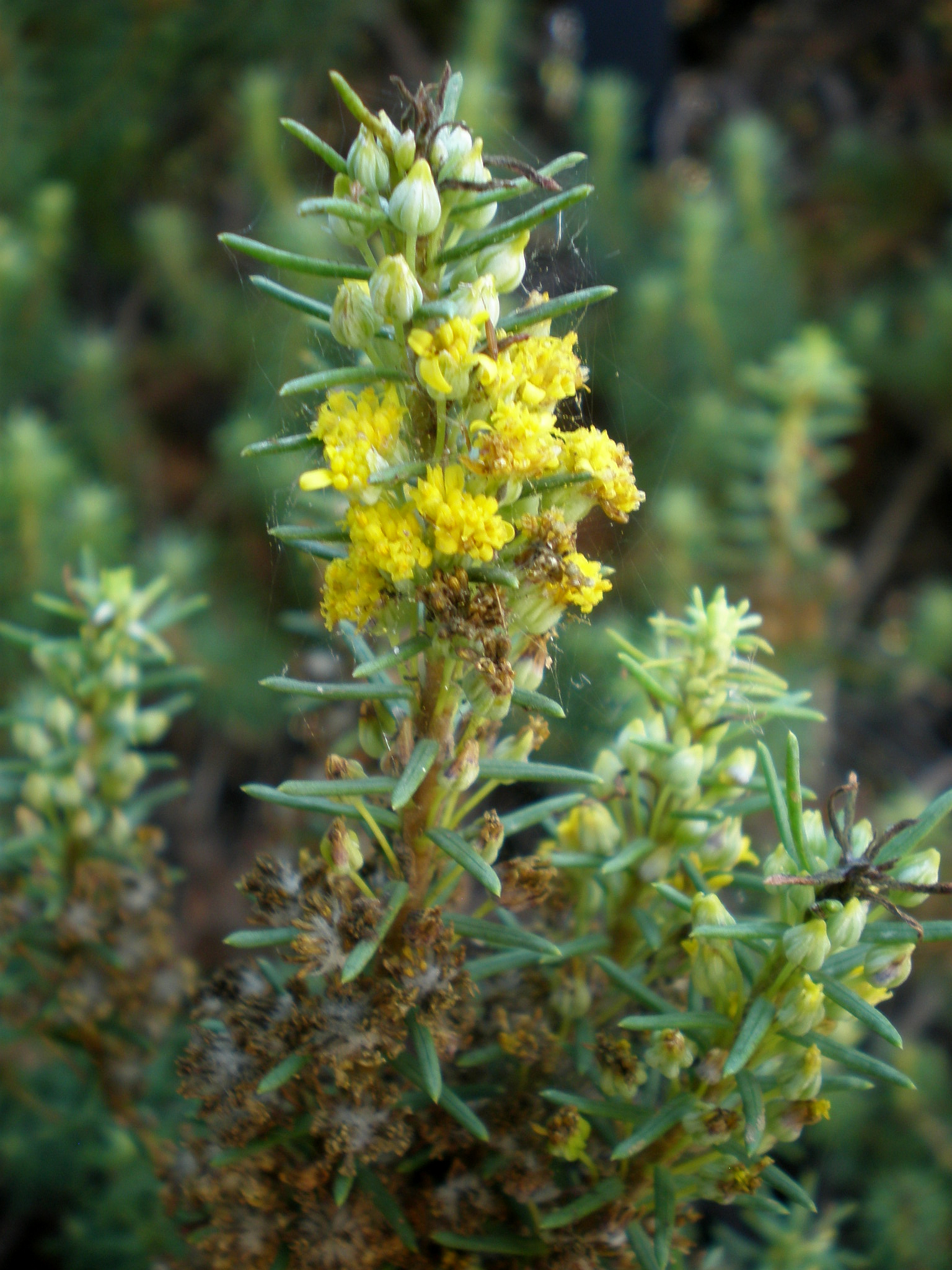
Euryops annae

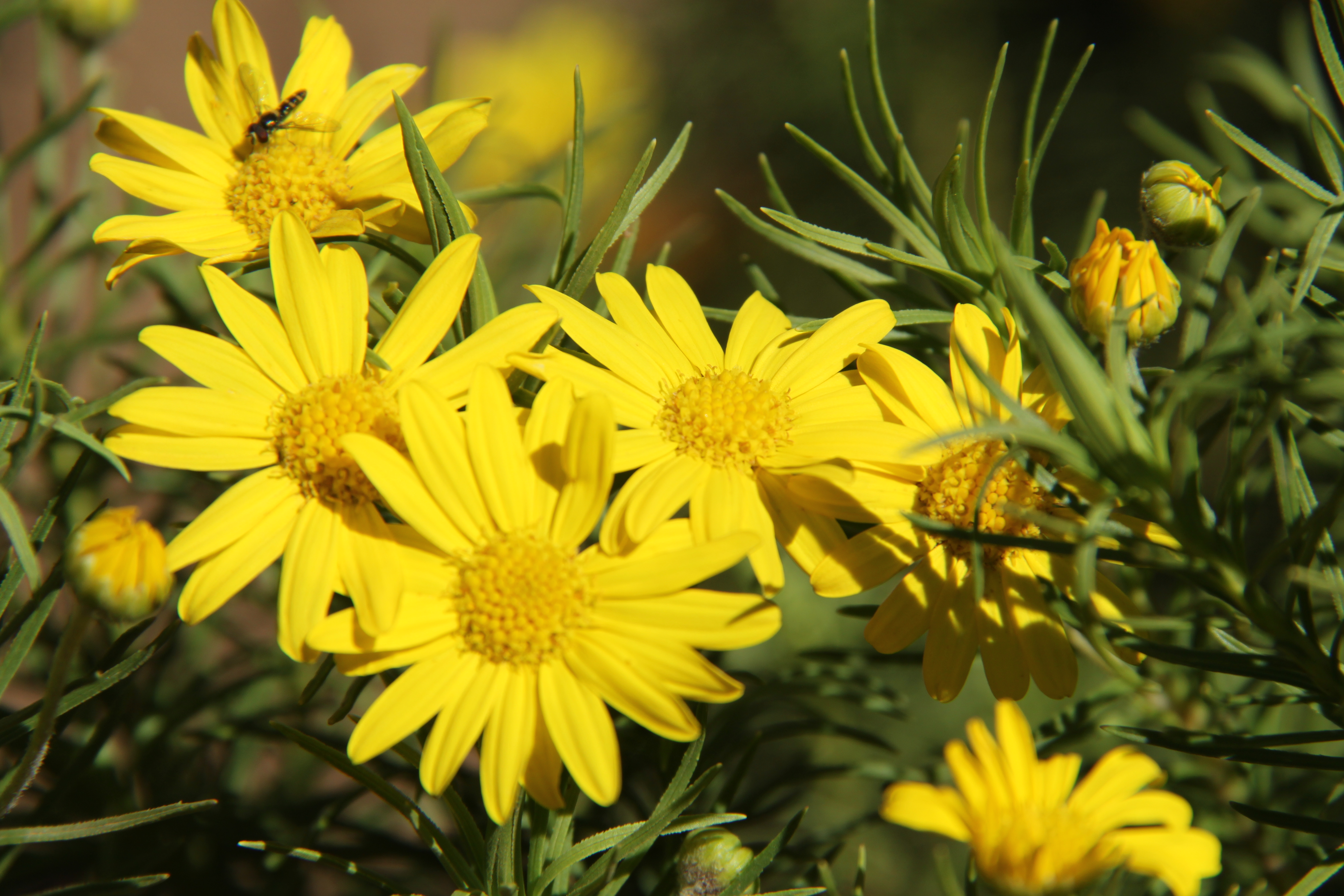
Euryops brownei, Kenya

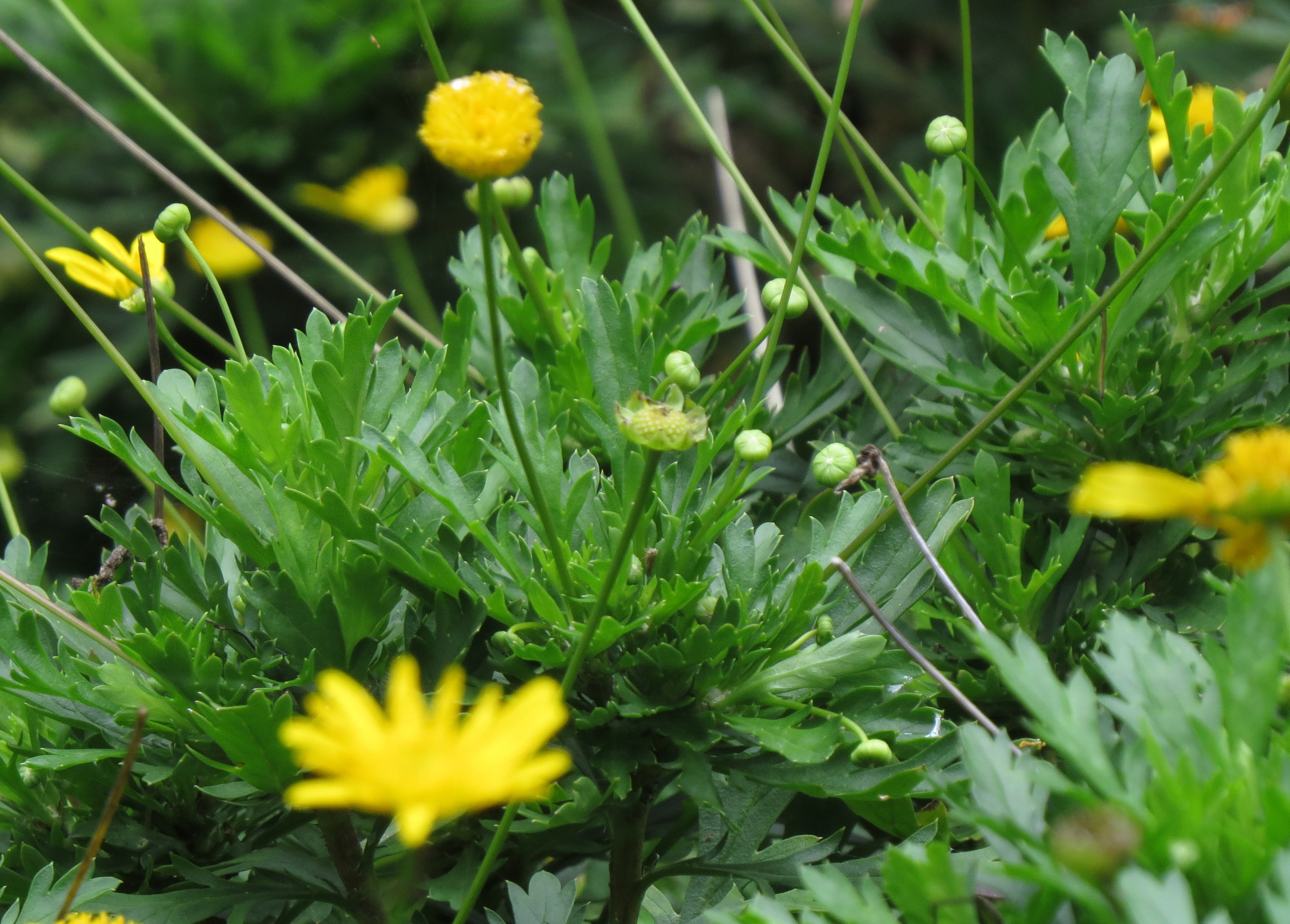
Euryops chrysanthemoides, South Africa

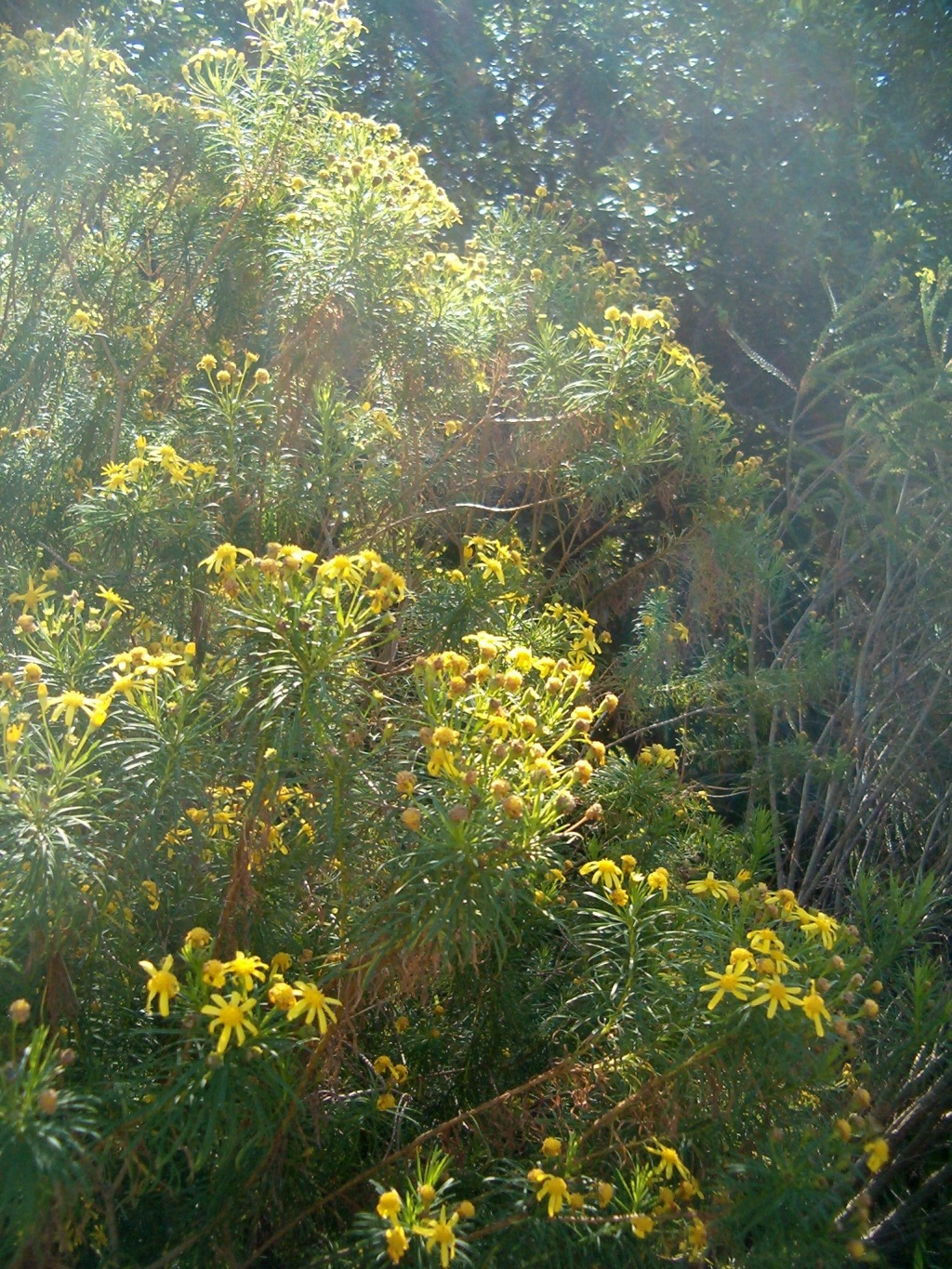
Euryops linearis, Western Cape, South Africa

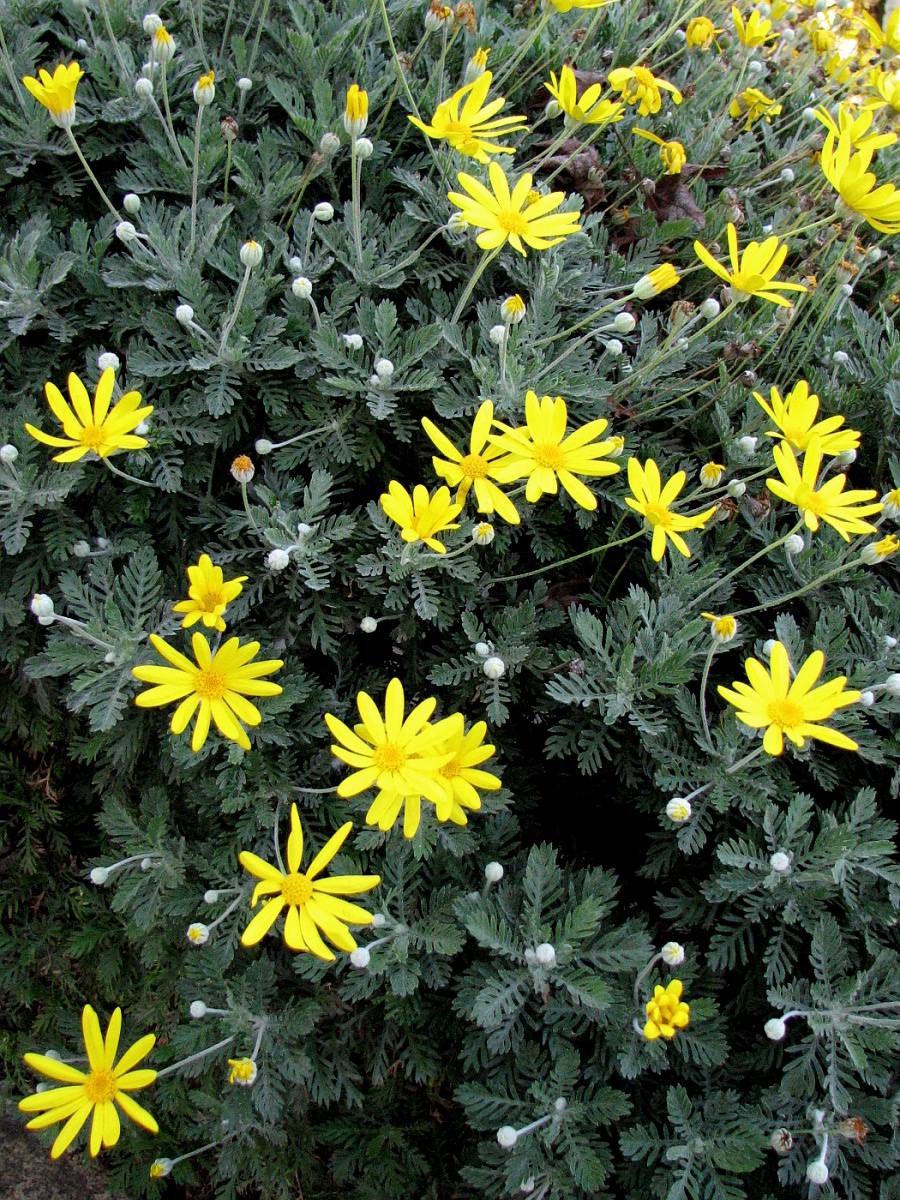
Euryops pectinatus, South Africa

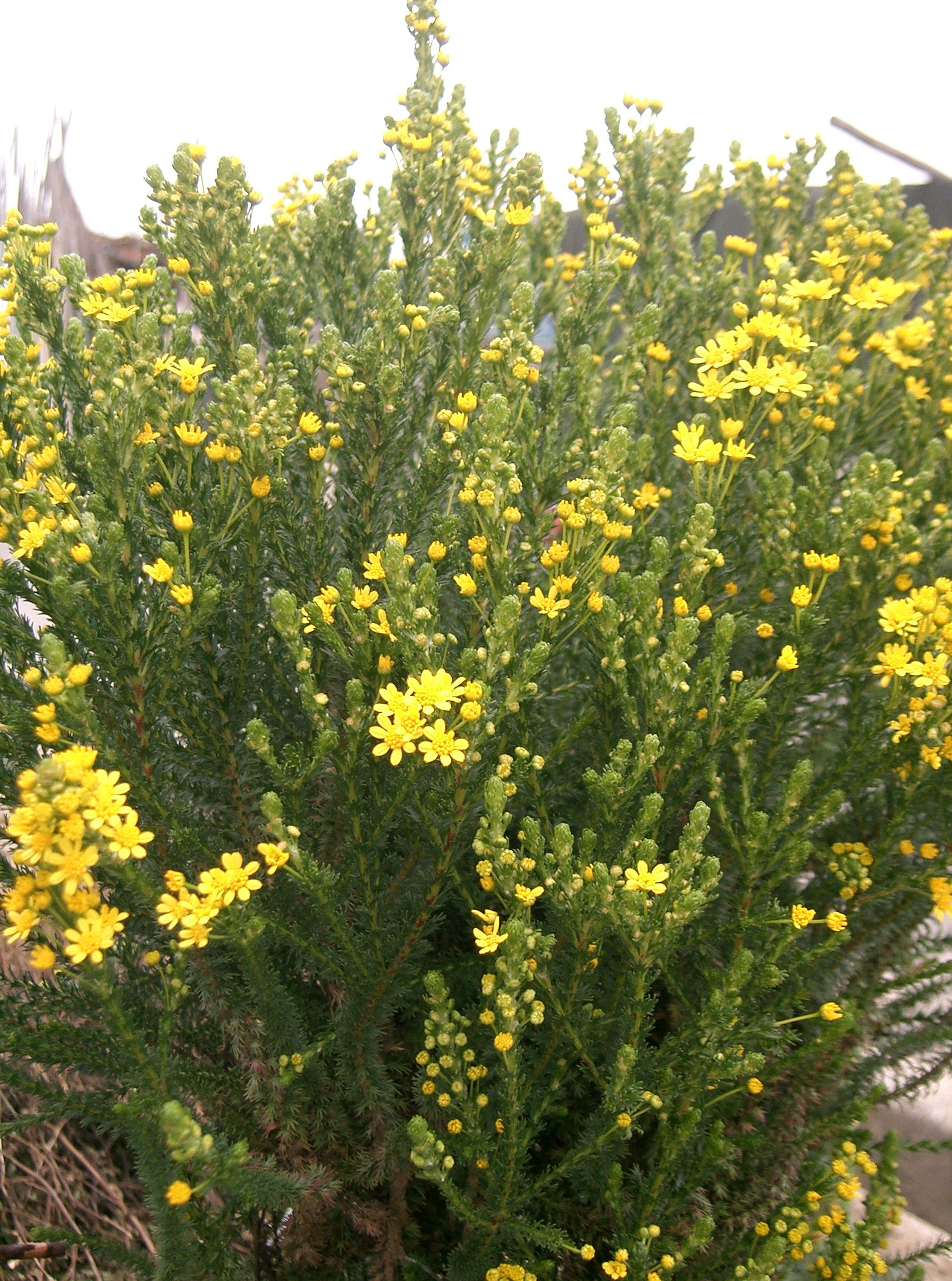
Euryops virgineus, South Africa

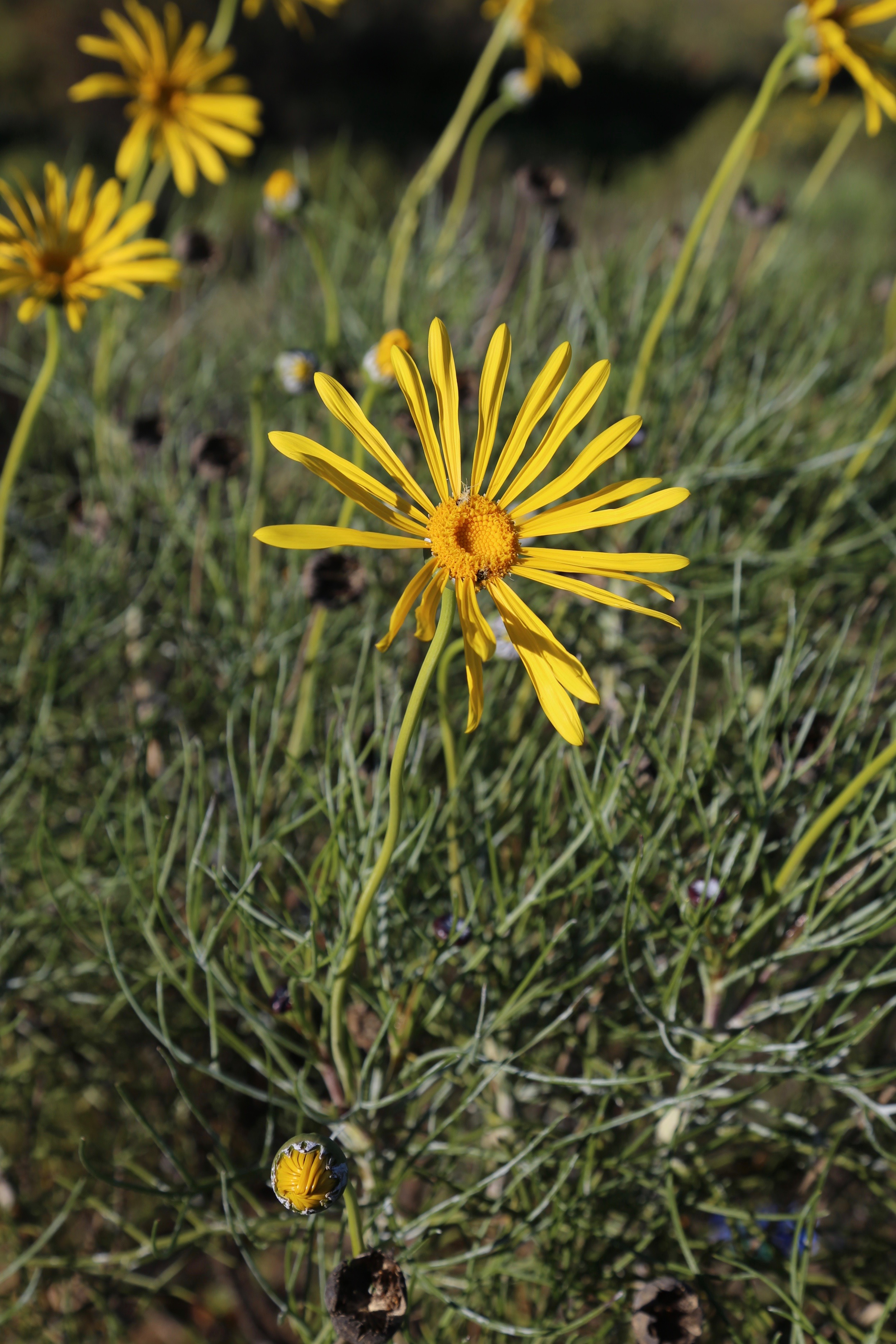
Euryops speciosissimus, Western Cape, South Africa

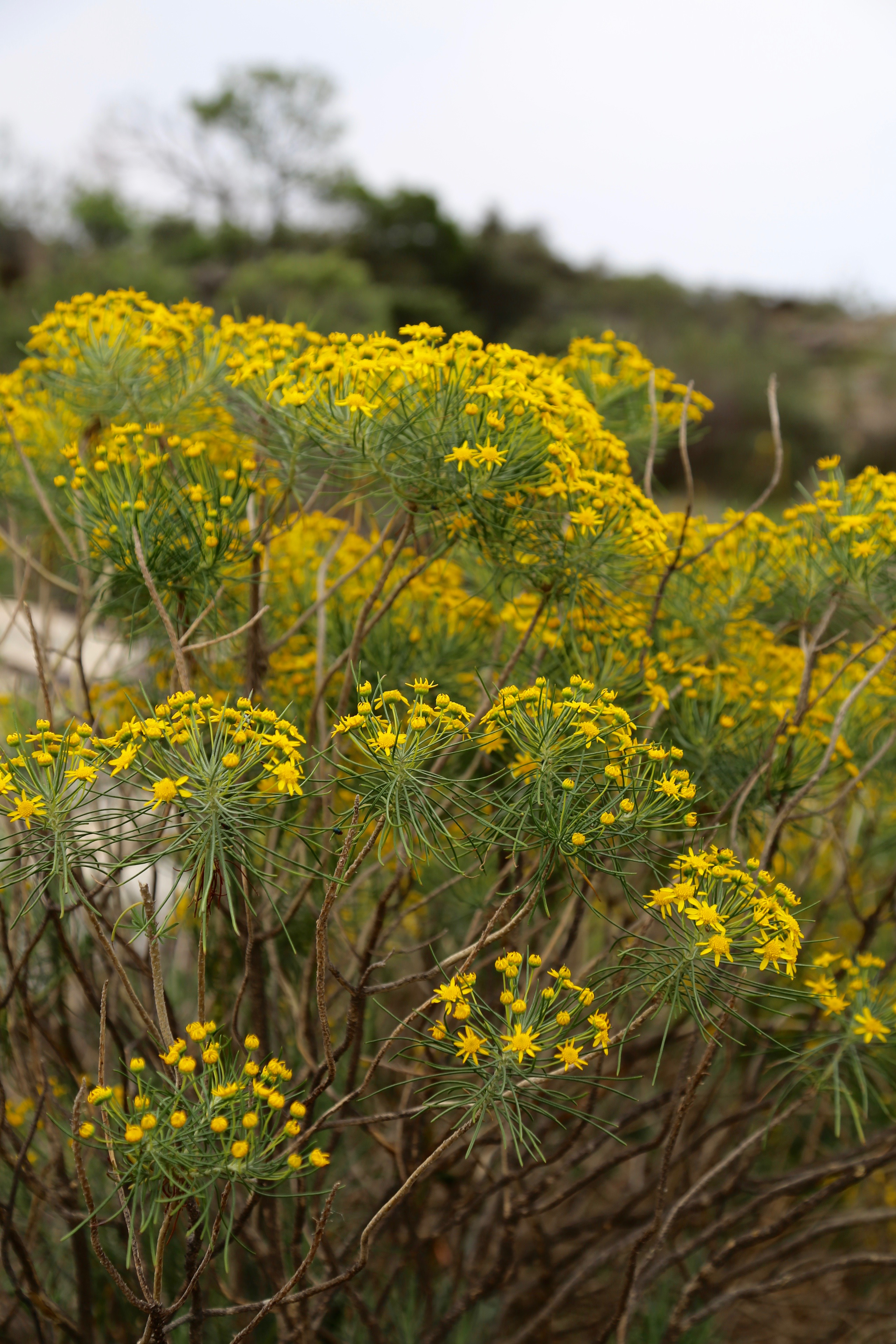
Euryops tenuissimus, Western Cape, South Africa

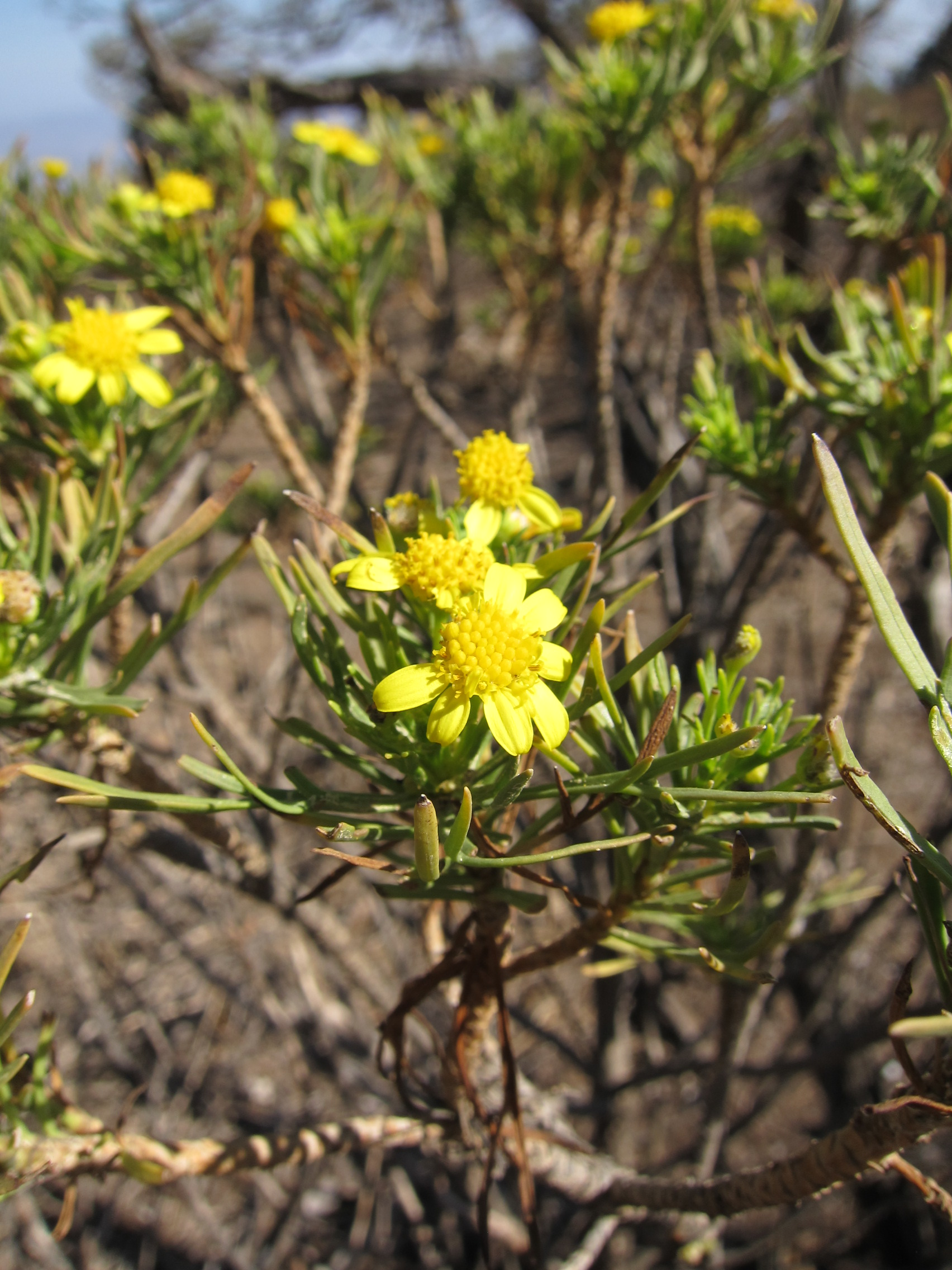
Euryops arabicus, Djibouti
