= Euryops mucosus =

Conservation status
- Near Threatened (IUCN 3.1)

Scientific classification
- Kingdom: Plantae
- Clade: Tracheophytes
- Clade: Angiosperms
- Clade: Eudicots
- Clade: Asterids
- Order: Asterales
- Family: Asteraceae
- Genus: Euryops
- Species: E. mucosus

Binomial name
- Euryops mucosus B.Nord.

Species of flowering plant

Euryops mucosus is a species of flowering plant in the family Asteraceae. It is found only in Namibia. Its natural habitat is subtropical or tropical dry shrubland. It is threatened by habitat loss.
