= Euryops ursinoides =

Scientific classification
- Kingdom: Plantae
- Clade: Tracheophytes
- Clade: Angiosperms
- Clade: Eudicots
- Clade: Asterids
- Order: Asterales
- Family: Asteraceae
- Genus: Euryops
- Species: E. ursinoides

Binomial name
- Euryops ursinoides B.Nord.

Species of plant endemic to South Africa

Euryops ursinoides is a highly endemic and vulnerable species from South Africa. It is in the daisy family.

== Description ==
This erect shrub grows 1-2 m tall. The leaves are long and linear. While it is mostly hairless, there are some woolly hairs in the leaf axils and at the bases of the leaf stems. There are three to six lobes on each side of the alternately arranged leaves. The leaves are close to each other and range from being somewhat erect to being completely spreading. They are usually somewhat wavy.

Flowers are present between July and December. The stems holding them are terminal and there may be between one and six of them on a branch. They are reddish or straw coloured and are smooth or slightly serrated. The lobes are green or straw coloured, but may be tinged with red or brown. The bracts surrounding the flowers have yellowish veins, The ray (outer) florets are yellow.

The achenes (small, dry fruit that contain a single seed) are light brown and have ten smooth ribs.

It may be confused with Euryops munitus, but it has larger leaves and flowerheads, and distinctly ridged fruits. It is also similar to Euryops bolusii but is notably larger.

== Distribution and habitat ==
This species is highly endemic. It grows on rocky sandstone slopes of the Van Staden’s Mountains, west of Gqeberha. It has also been found in the nearby Otterford Reserve.

== Conservation ==
This species is considered to be vulnerable due to its small area of occurrence.
