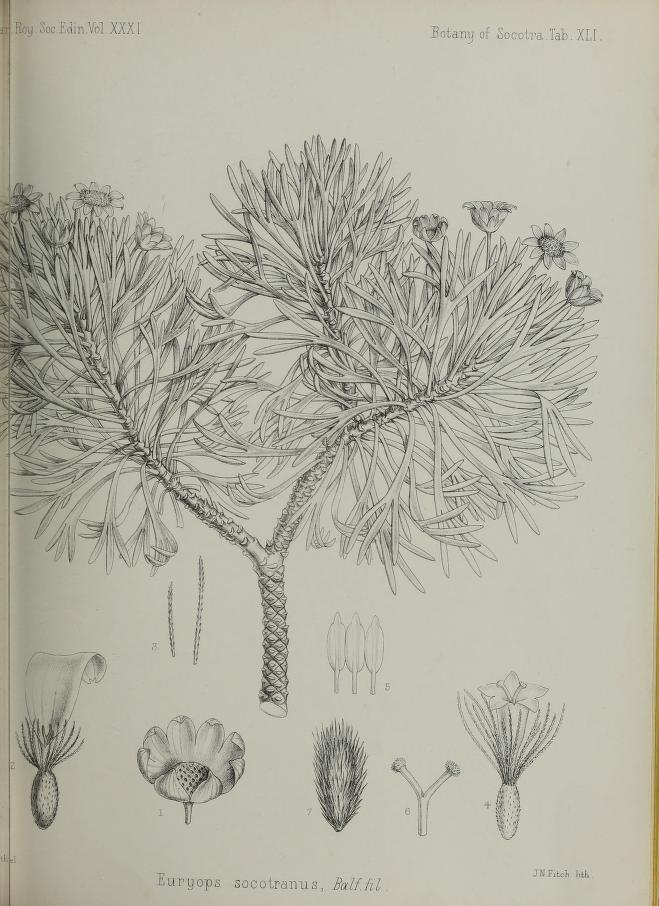

Scientific classification
- Kingdom: Plantae
- Clade: Tracheophytes
- Clade: Angiosperms
- Clade: Eudicots
- Clade: Asterids
- Order: Asterales
- Family: Asteraceae
- Genus: Euryops
- Species: E. arabicus

Binomial name
- Euryops arabicus Steud.

Synonyms
- Caraea pinifolia Hochst. ex Steud.; Euryops hildebrandtii Mattf.; Euryops socotranus Balf.f.; Jacobaeastrum arabicum (Steud.) Kuntze

= Euryops arabicus =

Species of flowering plant

Euryops arabicus is a species of flowering plant in the family Asteraceae that grows in the form of a bush. It is found on the Arabian Peninsula, Socotra, Somalia and Djibouti. Its natural habitat is subtropical or tropical dry shrubland.

== Description ==
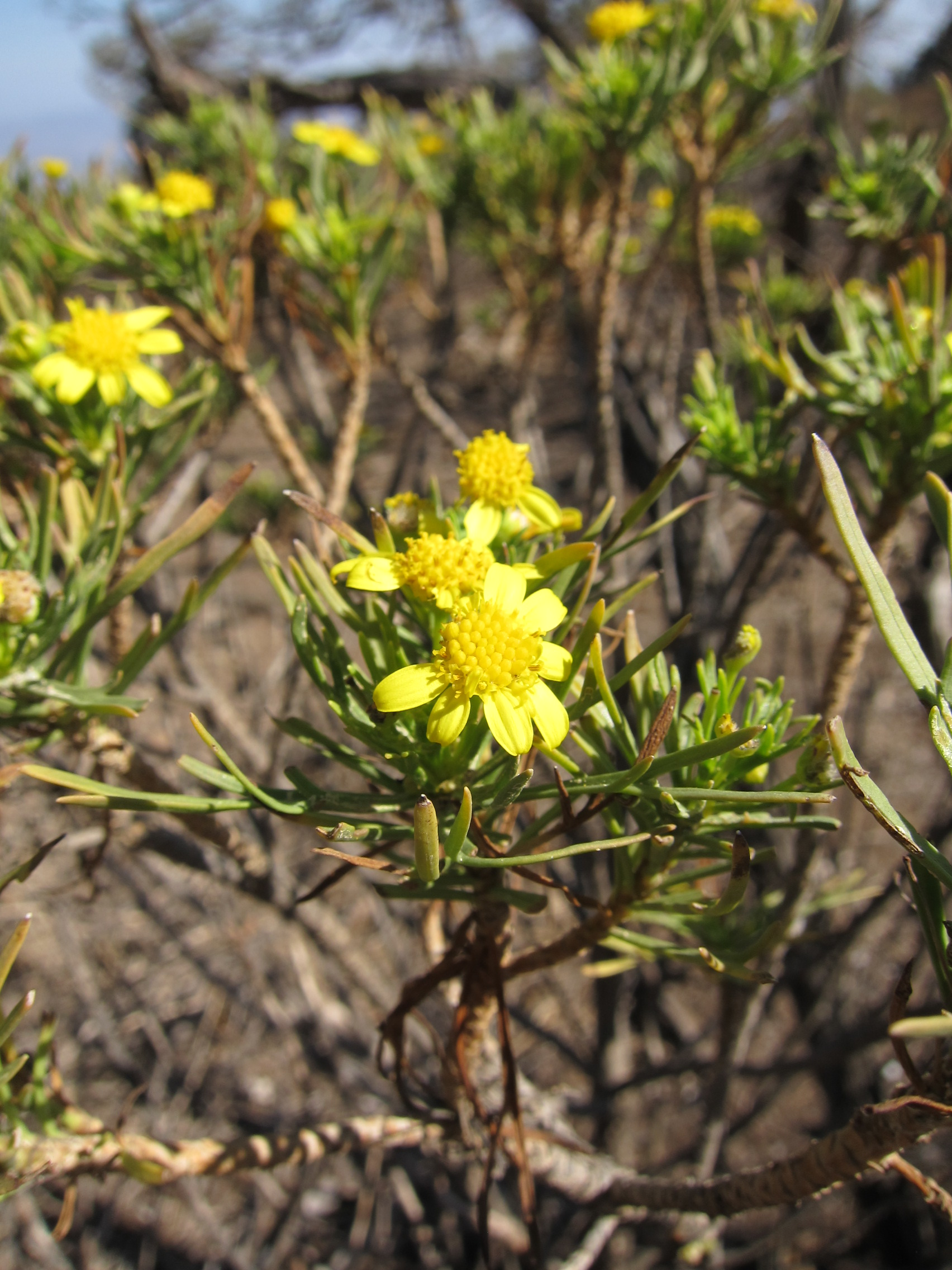
Euryops arabicus in Djibouti

Euryops arabicus is a small shrub up to about 2 m (7 ft) tall. The narrow lanceolate leaves are leathery and are concentrated towards the tips of the branches.

== Distribution and habitat ==
Euryops arabicus is found in the Arabian Peninsula where it grows in the cloud forest on north-facing slopes in montane woodland, and it is also found on the higher parts of Socotra, in Somalia and Djibouti.

== Ecology ==
In Saudi Arabia it grows alongside Juniperus procera, draped with the lichen Usnea articulata. It is unpalatable and may flourish in places where other shrubs are overgrazed.
