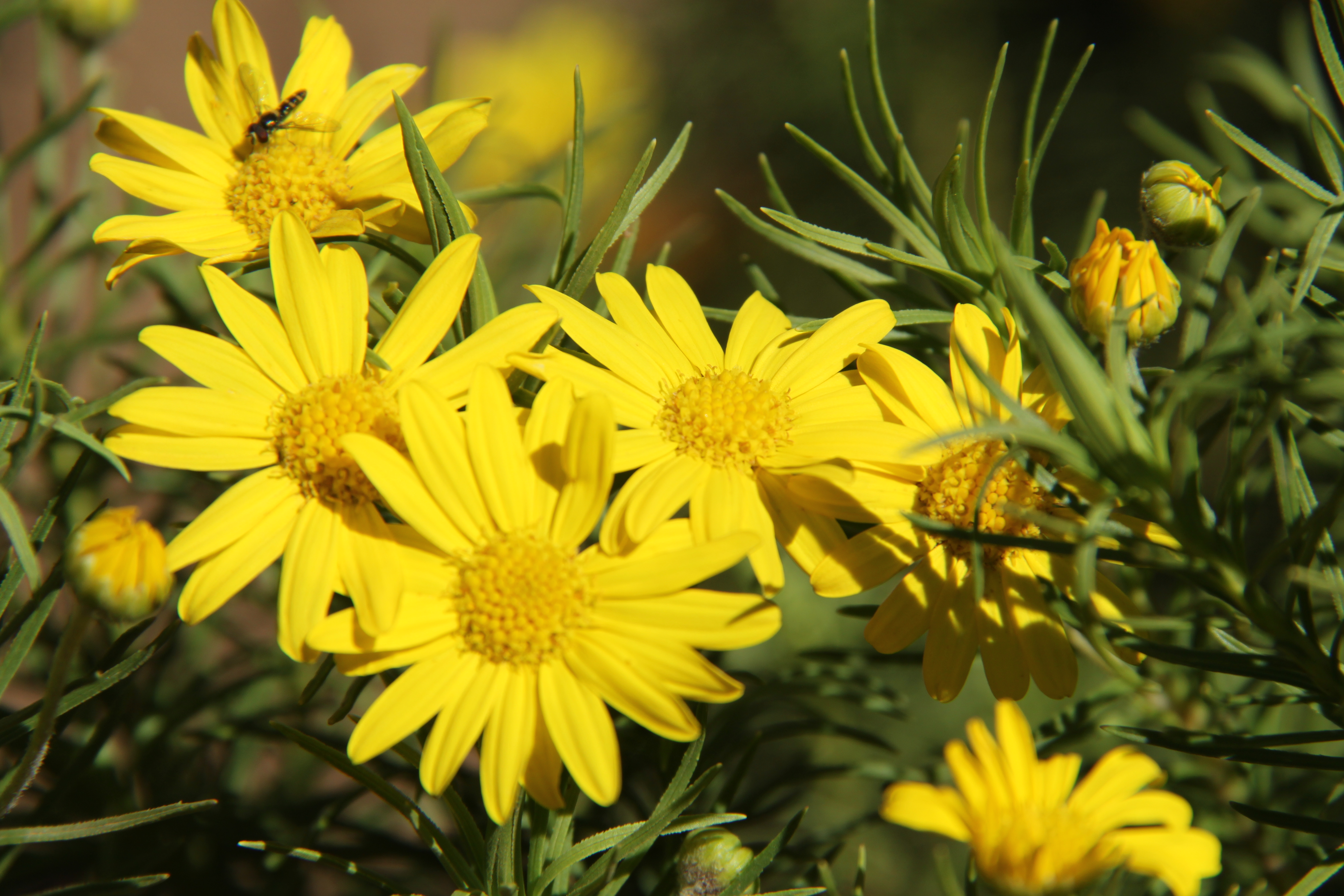

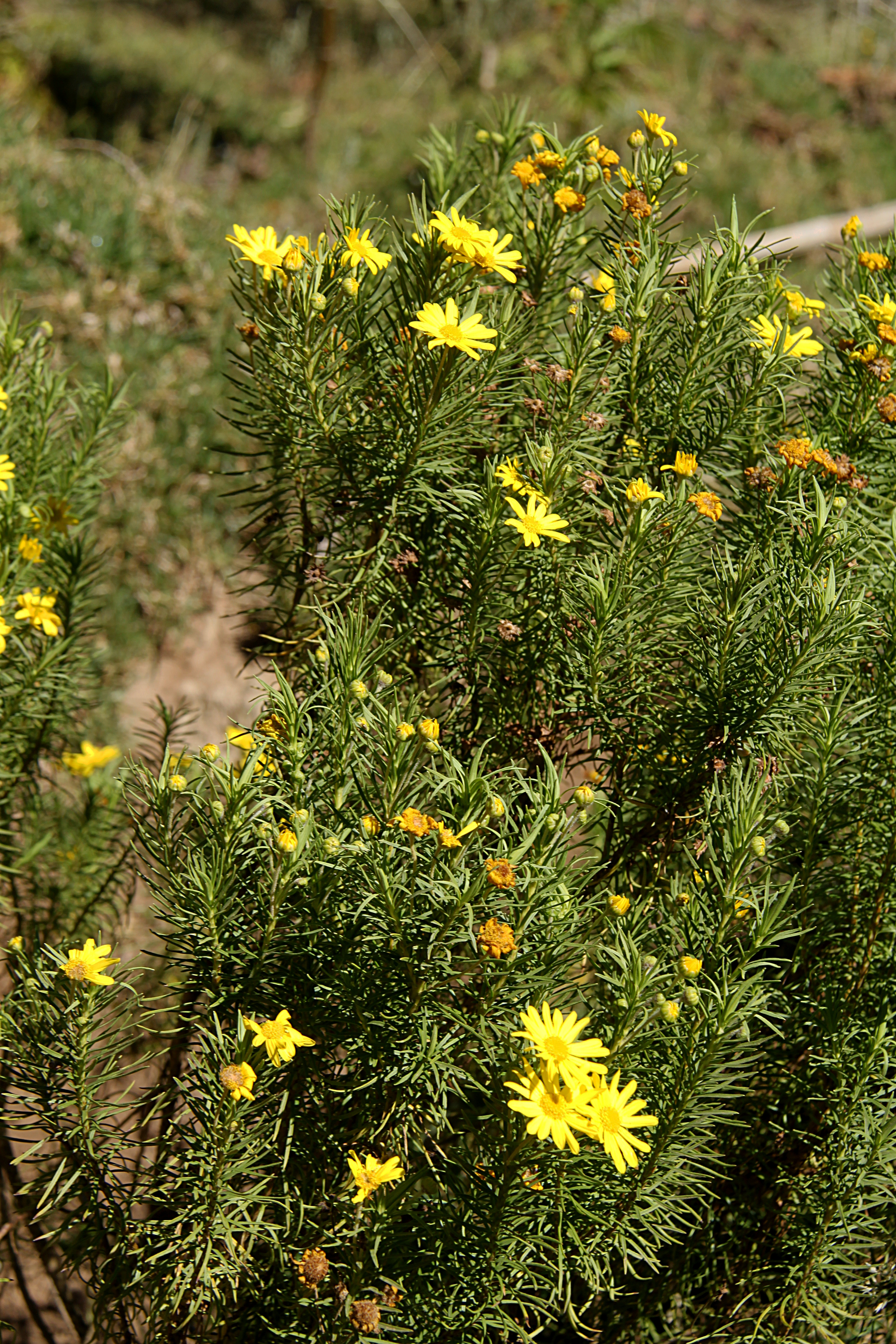

Scientific classification
- Kingdom: Plantae
- Clade: Tracheophytes
- Clade: Angiosperms
- Clade: Eudicots
- Clade: Asterids
- Order: Asterales
- Family: Asteraceae
- Genus: Euryops
- Species: E. brownei

Binomial name
- Euryops brownei S.Moore

= Euryops brownei =

Plant in the Asteraceae family from East Africa

Euryops brownei is a woody herb or shrub of 0.5–3 m (1.6–9.8 ft) high, with yellow flowerheads of both ray and disc florets, and small, narrow leaves, belonging to the daisy family. The species is native to the highlands of northern Tanzania and central Kenya.

== Description ==
Euryops brownei is a woody herb or shrub of 0.5–3 m (1.6–9.8 ft) high.

=== Stems and leaves ===
This plant has initially green but eventually blackish stems that show leaf-scars when the bases of the dead leaves have fallen. The light green leaves are set densely along the stem. They do not have a petiole, are linear in shape, 1–3.25 cm (1/2–1 1/4 in) long, 1–2.5 mm (0.04–0.10 in) wide, a little bit narrowed above a wider and membraneous base, entire or with minute saw teeth, with a blunt tip, and a row of short hairs on the margins near the base, otherwise without hair.

=== Inflorescences and fruits ===
The plants are rich in flower heads, which stand in the higher leaf axils on their own stem (peduncle) of .75–4.5 cm (0.30–1.77 in) long, with few hairs or densely woolly. The involucres are woolly at their base, and consist of thirteen to sixteen ovate or ovate-lanceolate bracts of 4.5–6.5 mm (0.18–0.26 in) long, fused with each other for the lower half or third, with a blunt or pointy tip, and short hairs at the tip. Each flower head consists of mostly thirteen (full range eleven to twenty one) bright yellow ray florets of 1–1.5 cm (0.4–0.6 in) long and 2.7–4 mm (0.11–0.16 in) wide on the outside and many yellow disc florets of 2.25–4 mm long. The indehiscent, one-seeded fruits (called cypselas) are oblong in shape, 2.5–4.5 mm (0.10–0.18 in) long, with five to eight ribs, without or with some short hairs, and topped with a pappus that consists of bristles of 1–2.5 mm (0.04–0.1 in) long.

== Taxonomy ==
Euryops brownei was first described by Spencer Le Marchant Moore in 1916, based on a plant collected by Browne on Mount Kenya in 1914, now at the Natural History Museum, London. Johannes Mattfeld described Euryops agrianthoides in 1924 based on a collection from Mount Meru by Uhlig. Robert Elias Fries considered a plant he collected in the Aberdare Range at Sattima to be sufficiently different to distinguish it as Euryops brownei subsp. aberdarica in 1928. All these names are now considered synonyms.

== Distribution ==
Euryops brownei is an endemic of Mount Elgon, Cherangani, the Aberdare Range, Mount Kenya and Mount Meru, where it usually grows at altitudes between 2,700–3,750 m (8,860–12,300 ft), but occasionally can be found as low as 1,550 m (5,090 ft).

== Ecology ==
Euryops brownei can amongst elsewhere be found in the lower alpine zone of Mount Kenya, where it grows together with the shrubs Adenocarpus mannii, Anthospermum usambarense, Helichrysum chionoides, Phillippia excelsa, Protea kilimandscharica and Struthiola thomsonii, grasses Deschampsia flexuosa and Pentaschistis minor, herbs Dierama cupuliflorum, Gladiolus watsonioides, Alepidea massaica, among others.
