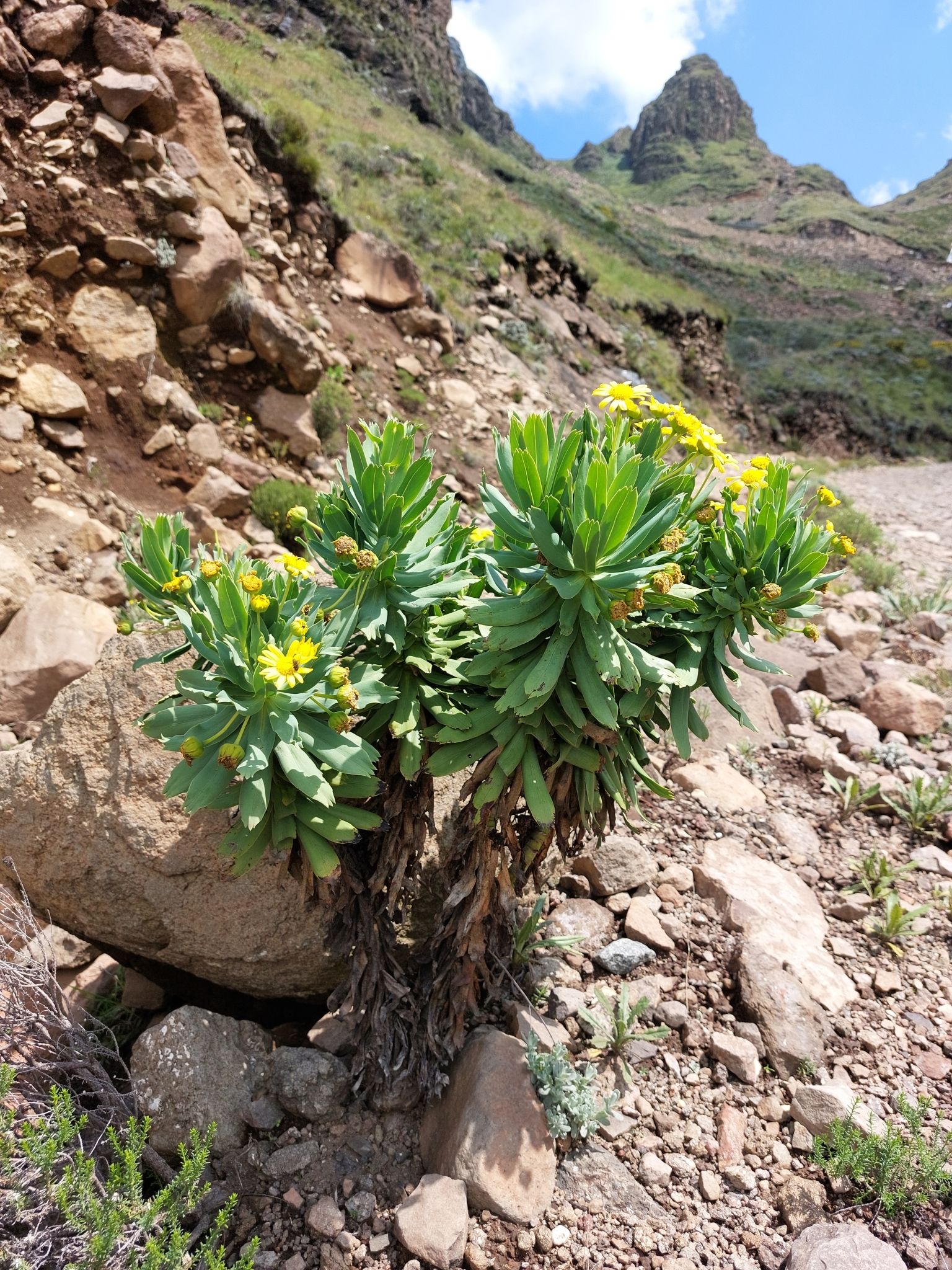

Scientific classification
- Kingdom: Plantae
- Clade: Tracheophytes
- Clade: Angiosperms
- Clade: Eudicots
- Clade: Asterids
- Order: Asterales
- Family: Asteraceae
- Genus: Euryops
- Species: E. evansii

Binomial name
- Euryops evansii Schltr.

Synonyms
- Euryops evansii subsp. dendroides B. Nord.; Euryops evansii subsp. evansii; Euryops evansii subsp. parvus B. Nord.

= Euryops evansii =

Species of plant

Euryops evansii is a species of flowering plant in the family Asteraceae found in South Africa and Lesotho. It has multiple yellow flowers and grows as a shrub.
