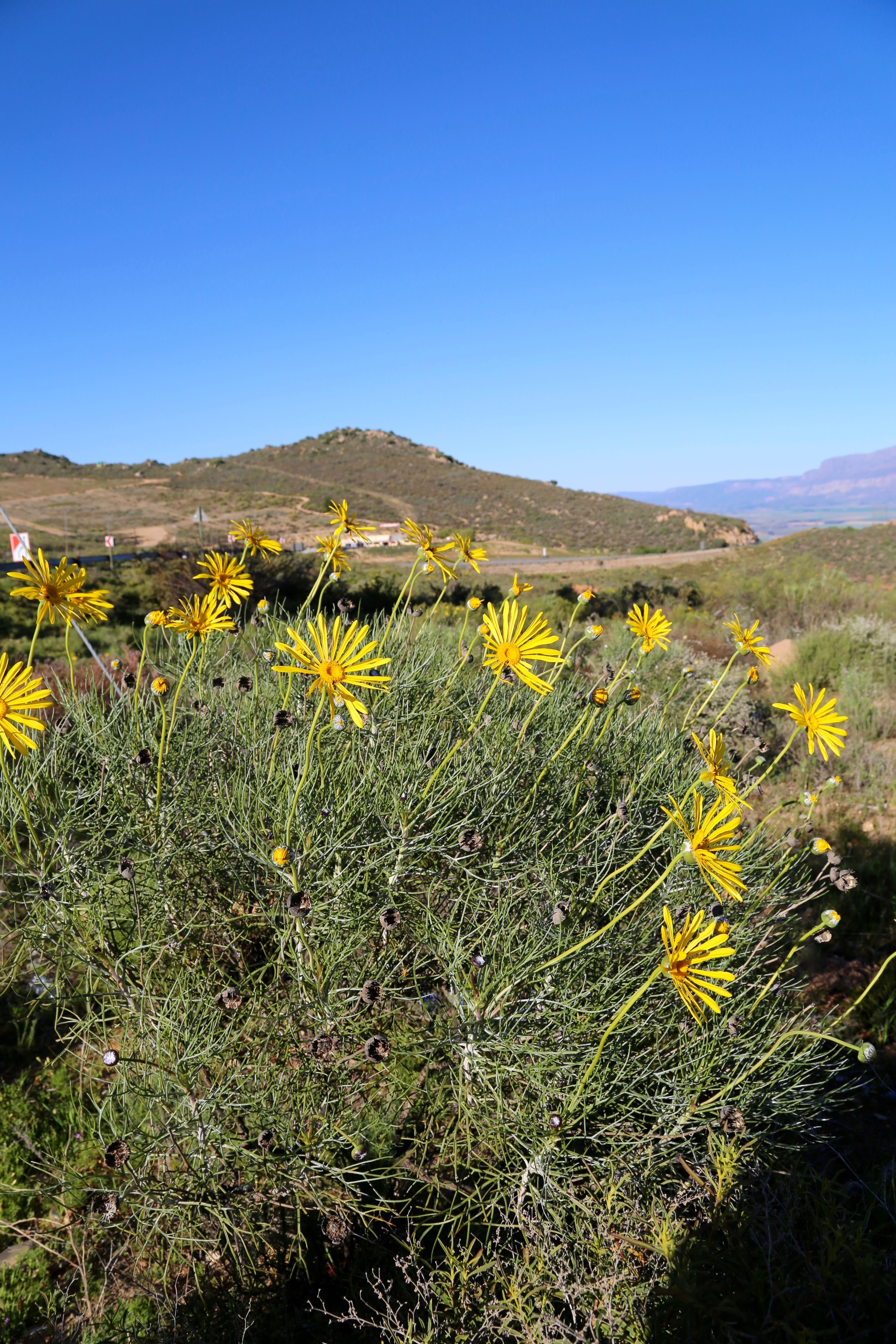

Conservation status
- Least Concern (SANBI Red List)

Scientific classification
- Kingdom: Plantae
- Clade: Embryophytes
- Clade: Tracheophytes
- Clade: Angiosperms
- Clade: Eudicots
- Clade: Asterids
- Order: Asterales
- Family: Asteraceae
- Genus: Euryops
- Species: E. speciosissimus

Binomial name
- Euryops speciosissimus DC.

Synonyms
- Euryops athanasiae (L.f.) Harv.; Euryops megalanthus Gand.

= Euryops speciosissimus =

Species of flowering shrub endemic to the Fynbos region

Euryops speciosissimus is a species of flowering shrub in the genus Euryops. It is endemic to the fynbos region of South Africa. It is also known as the Clanwilliam daisy and giant resinbush; in Afrikaans it is called harpuisbos, meaning resin bush.
