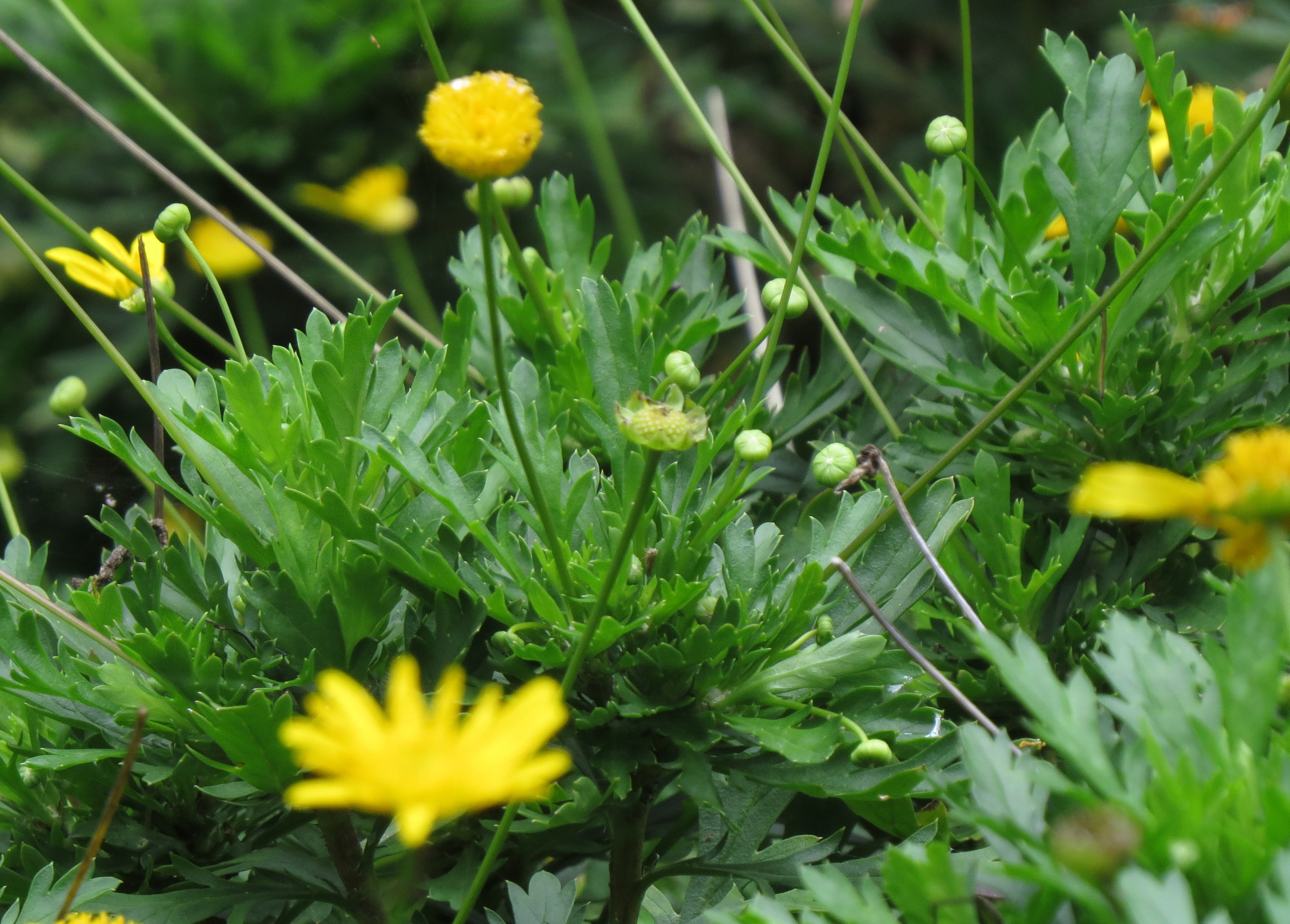

Scientific classification
- Kingdom: Plantae
- Clade: Tracheophytes
- Clade: Angiosperms
- Clade: Eudicots
- Clade: Asterids
- Order: Asterales
- Family: Asteraceae
- Genus: Euryops
- Species: E. chrysanthemoides

Binomial name
- Euryops chrysanthemoides (DC.) B.Nord.

Synonyms
- Gamolepis chrysanthemoides DC.

= Euryops chrysanthemoides =

Species of flowering plant

Euryops chrysanthemoides (with the common names African bush daisy or bull's-eye) is a small shrub native to Southern Africa that is also grown as a horticultural specimen in tropical to subtropical regions around the world.

== Description ==
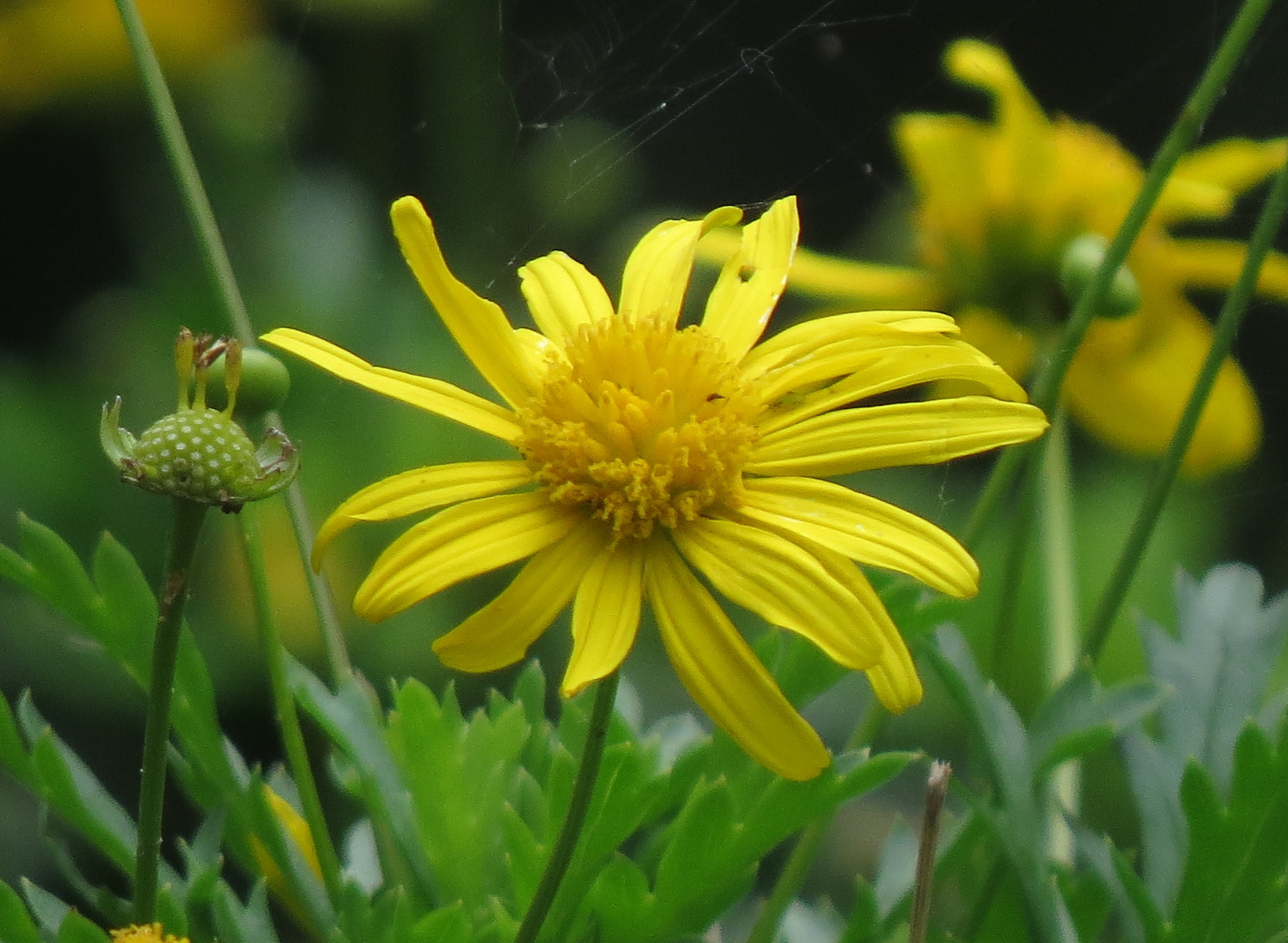
Detail of Euryops chrysanthemoides flower

It is a compact, densely branched, leafy, evergreen shrub, 0.5 to 2m in height. The leaf surface is smooth and green. The species was moved to Euryops from the genus Gamolepis on the basis of chromosome counts.

== Distribution ==
Euryops chrysanthemoides is indigenous to southern Africa, where it occurs in the Eastern Cape, along the coast and inland, to KwaZulu-Natal, Mpumalanga and Eswatini. It is usually found on forest edges, in riverine bush and in ravines, as well as in coastal scrub, grassland and disturbed areas. It is a ruderal weed in New South Wales, although it is not invasive in all places where it is cultivated or has naturalized.
