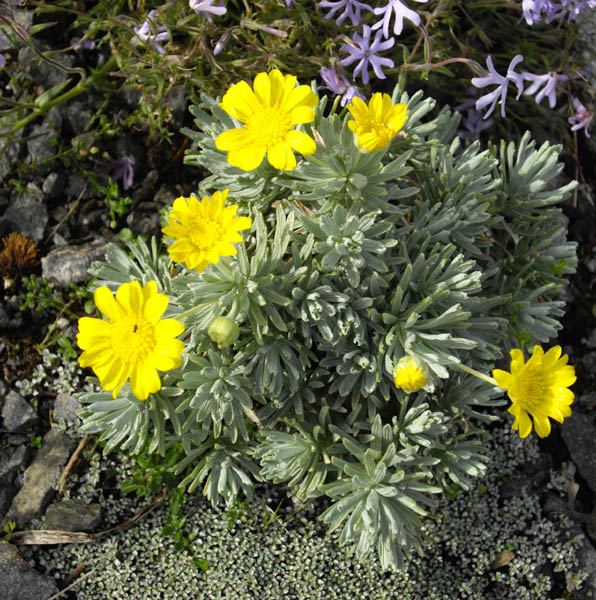

Scientific classification
- Kingdom: Plantae
- Clade: Tracheophytes
- Clade: Angiosperms
- Clade: Eudicots
- Clade: Asterids
- Order: Asterales
- Family: Asteraceae
- Genus: Euryops
- Species: E. acraeus

Binomial name
- Euryops acraeus M.D.Hend.

= Euryops acraeus =

Species of flowering plant

Euryops acraeus, the mountain euryops, is a species of flowering plant in the daisy family Asteraceae, native to the Drakensberg Mountains of South Africa. It is a dwarf, rounded evergreen shrub growing to 30 cm (12 in) tall and wide, with silver-blue leaves and masses of yellow composite flowers in spring and summer.

The Latin specific epithet acraeus means "dwelling on high ground". Reflecting its rocky mountainous habitat, in cultivation this plant requires full sun and very sharp drainage, preferably in an alpine garden. It has gained the Royal Horticultural Society's Award of Garden Merit.
