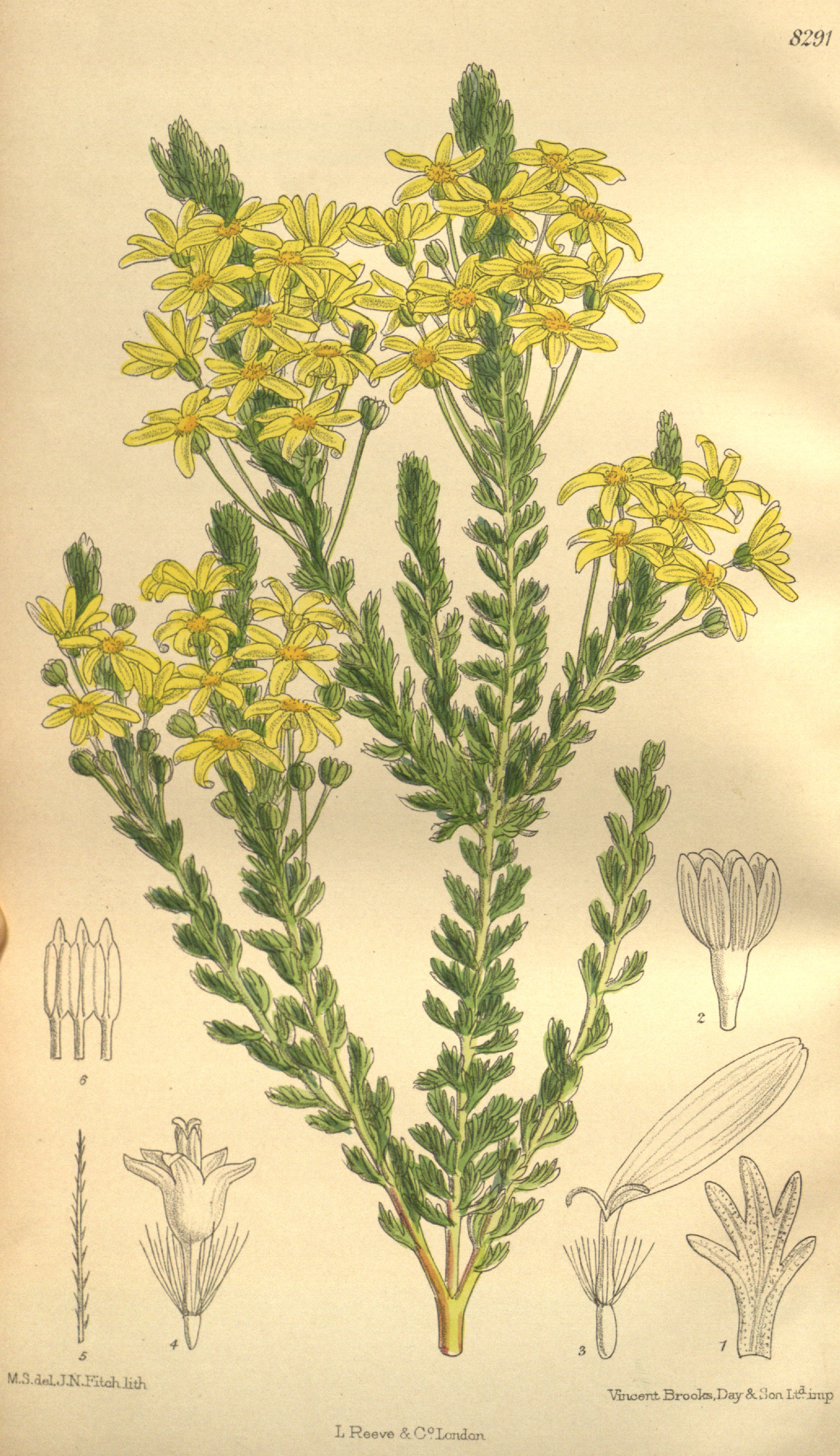
- A drawing of Euryops virgineus

Scientific classification
- Kingdom: Plantae
- Clade: Tracheophytes
- Clade: Angiosperms
- Clade: Eudicots
- Clade: Asterids
- Order: Asterales
- Family: Asteraceae
- Genus: Euryops
- Species: E. virgineus

Binomial name
- Euryops virgineus (L.f.) DC.

= Euryops virgineus =

Species of flowering plant

Euryops virgineus is a species of flowering plant with yellow leaves, native to South Africa.

== Description ==
A green plant with small narrow, carrot-like laves and large green stems. The flower is yellow with many long petals.

== Range ==
South Africa. Naturalized in New Zealand.
