= Gamsberg Nature Reserve =

Nature reserve in Namibia

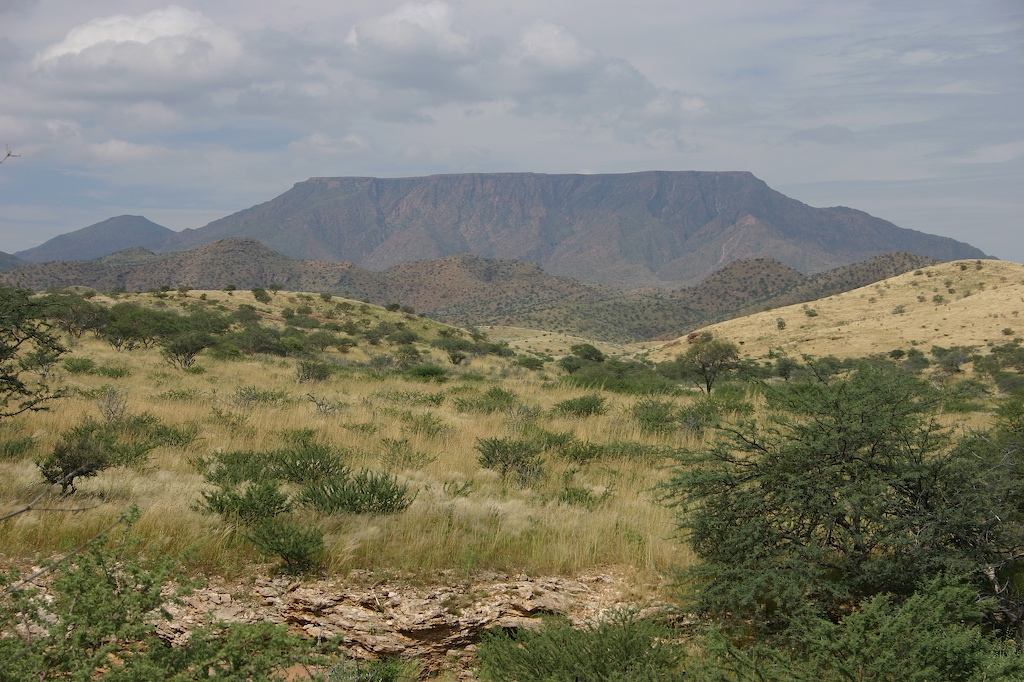
- The Gamsberg Mountain in the distance

- Location within Namibia
- Nearest city: Rehoboth
- Coordinates: 23°20′S 16°12′E

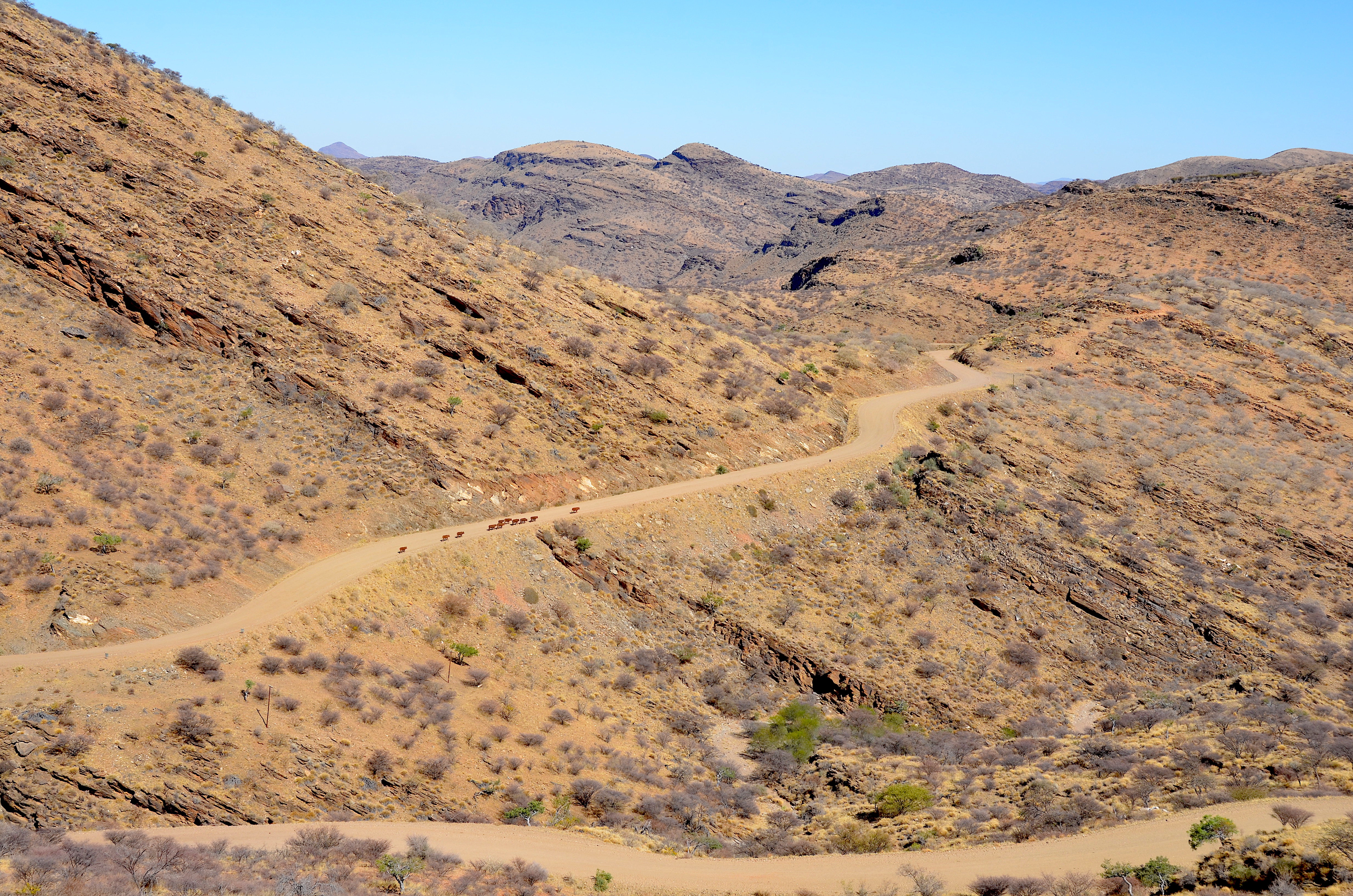
C26 road at Gamsberg Pass in Namibia (2014)

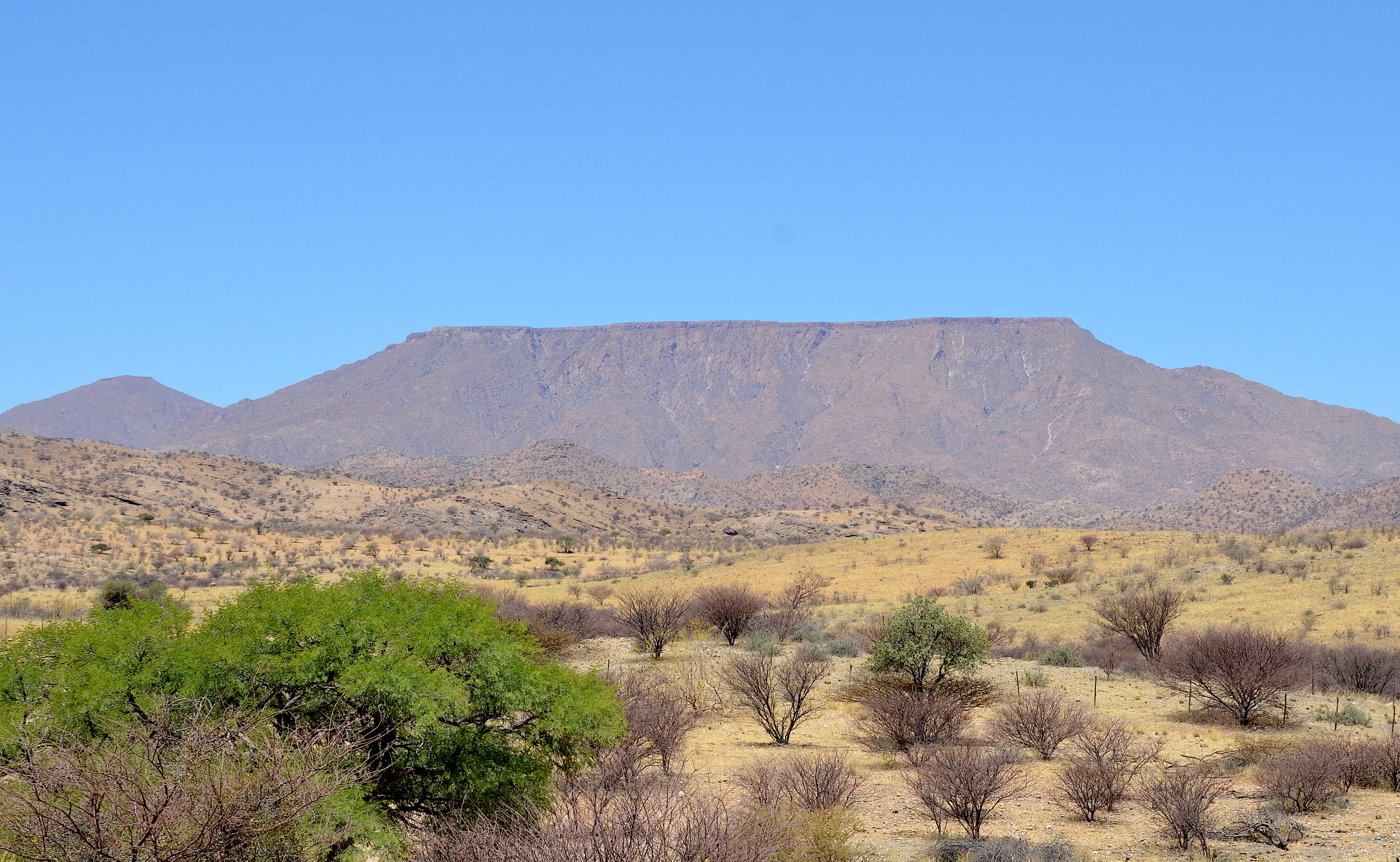
Gamsberg mountain in Namibia (2014)

Gamsberg Nature Reserve is a protected reserve of Namibia, located west of Rehoboth. Within the reserve the flat-topped Gamsberg mountain is found. With its 2,347 m (7,700 ft) above sea level it is said to be the third highest mountain in Namibia. The mountains separating the Namib Desert form the Khomas highlands.

In this area, it is possible to observe stars with little or very little light pollution, and the Africa Millimetre Telescope is planned for construction in the area.
