= Sabie (disambiguation) =

Sabie is a town in South Africa. It may also refer to

- Sabie River in South Africa
- Sabie (surname)

== See also ==
- Lower Sabie, a camp in the Kruger National Park on the southern bank of the Sabie River
