= Shortfin barb =

Conservation status
- Near Threatened (IUCN 3.1)

Scientific classification
- Kingdom: Animalia
- Phylum: Chordata
- Class: Actinopterygii
- Order: Cypriniformes
- Family: Cyprinidae
- Subfamily: Smiliogastrinae
- Genus: Enteromius
- Species: E. brevipinnis

Binomial name
- Enteromius brevipinnis R. A. Jubb, 1966

Synonyms
- Barbus brevipinnis Jubb, 1966; Barbus brevipennis Jubb, 1966

Species of fish

The shortfin barb (Enteromius brevipinnis) is a species of cyprinid fish native to southern Africa, where it occurs in a number of river systems in South Africa and Eswatini. It inhabits well-vegetated headwater streams. This species can reach 4.5 centimetres (1.8 in) in standard length. It can also be found in the aquarium trade.

== Taxonomy ==
The shortfin barb was first described by Reginald Arthur Jubb in 1966. It has also been referred to by the synonyms Barbus brevipinnis and Barbus brevipennis. It is classified in the Cyprinidae family (the carps and minnows) in the class Actinopterygii.

== Description ==
This species grows to a maximum of 4.5 centimetres (1.8 in) in standard length. The dorsal fin has 10–11 soft rays and the anal fin has eight soft rays.

== Distribution ==
The shortfin barb occurs in the Sabie-Sand River system and the Hlelo River catchment in the Mpumalanga province of South Africa, tributaries of the Phongolo River in South Africa's Kwa-Zulu Natal and in Swaziland, and the Shelangubu and Lomati rivers (and their tributaries) in Swaziland.

== Ecology ==
This species prefers vegetated headwater streams with undercut banks and present rootstocks. It feeds on invertebrates and zooplankton. The fish breeds in spring and summer.

The shortfin barb is uncommon in most of its range, though it is perhaps most numerous in tributaries of the Sabie River. It has an extent of occurrence of 17,077 km^{2} and an area of occupancy of 96 km^{2}. It has several isolated subpopulations with significant genetic differences; further study is required to determine whether any of these subpopulations have undergone speciation.

The shortfin barb is assessed as a near threatened species on the IUCN Red List, and its population is decreasing. It faces habitat destruction as a result of forestry activities, damming, and water extraction upstream of its river habitats. Eutrophication from urban pollution and habitat fragmentation caused by road river crossings are also factors, as is predation from a number of invasive species.

It is used in the aquarium trade.

== See also ==
- List of freshwater aquarium fish species
