= Witklip Dam =

- Interactive map of Witklip Dam
- Official name: Witklip Dam
- Location: Mpumalanga, South Africa
- Coordinates: 25°14′10″S 30°54′1″E
- Opening date: 1969
- Operators: Department of Water Affairs and Forestry

Dam and spillways
- Type of dam: gravity, arch
- Impounds: Sand River
- Height: 21.6 metres (71 ft)
- Length: 670 metres (2,200 ft)

Reservoir
- Creates: Witklip Dam Reservoir
- Total capacity: 12,970,000 cubic metres (458,000,000 cu ft)
- Surface area: 178 hectares (440 acres)

Witklip Dam is a gravity and arch type dam located on the Sand River near Sabie, Mpumalanga, South Africa. It was established in 1969 and serves primarily for irrigation purposes. The hazard potential of the dam has been ranked high (3).

== See also ==
- List of reservoirs and dams in South Africa
- List of rivers of South Africa
