= Sabi River =

Sabi River may refer to:

- Sabi or Sahibi River, in Rajasthan, Haryana and Delhi states in India
- Sabi or Save River (Africa), in Zimbabwe and central Mozambique

== See also ==
- Sabie River, in South Africa and southern Mozambique
