= Skukuza Airport =

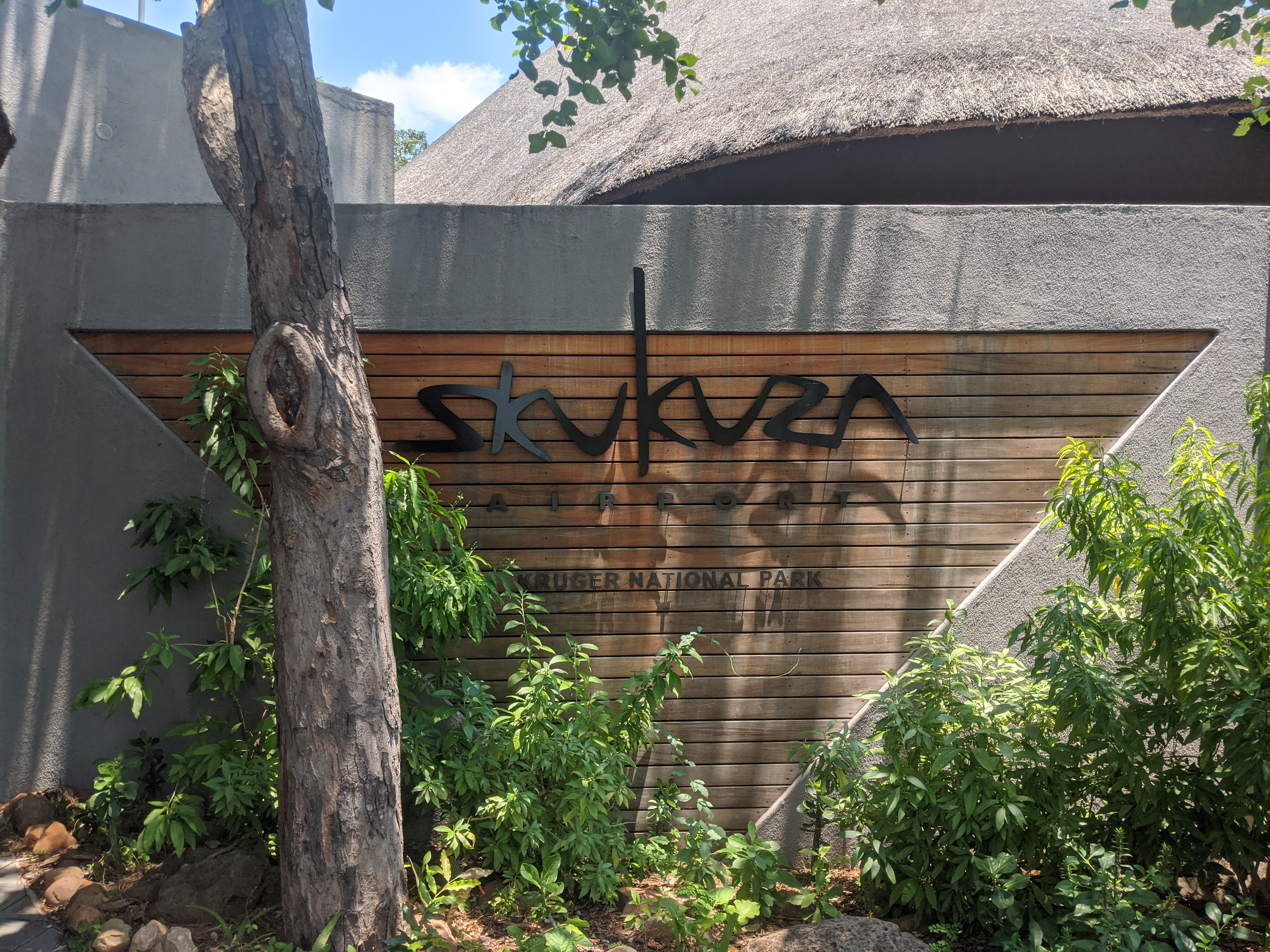
- Sign at the entrance to the airport
- IATA: SZK; ICAO: FASZ

Summary
- Airport type: Public
- Serves: Kruger National Park
- Location: Skukuza, Mpumalanga, South Africa
- Hub for: Airlink
- Elevation AMSL: 1,020 ft (310 m)
- Coordinates: 24°57′39″S 31°35′19″E

Map
- Location of airport in Mpumalanga province Location of Mpumalanga in South Africa

Runways
Direction	Length		Surface
Direction	m	ft	Surface
17/35	1,550	5,085	Asphalt
- Sources: South African AIP, DAFIF

Skukuza Airport (IATA: SZK, ICAO: FASZ) is the only commercial airport in Kruger National Park, located near Skukuza, in the Mpumalanga province in South Africa. The airport was established in 1958 and was named in honour of James Stevenson-Hamilton, the first warden of the Kruger national park. In 2018, the airport was dubbed "the prettiest airport in the world" by Forbes.

== Facilities ==
The airport has a small retail gift shop as well as a coffee shop and bar for visitors waiting for their flights. Three check-in counters are available, and there are couches available as well.

Only daytime parking is available (no overnight).

=== Ground transport ===
Avis Car Rental runs the car rental facilities at both Skukuza camp and Skukuza Airport. In addition to the rental facility at the airport, they provide a shuttle service to the main Skukuza camp. Lion Sands Reserve provides free shuttles from Skukuza airport for guests to the reserve.

=== Runway ===
The airport is at an elevation of 1,020 feet (311 m) above mean sea level. It has one runway designated 17/35 with an asphalt surface measuring 1,550 by 30 metres (5,085 ft × 98 ft). The runway is sloped, putting the northwest end at 1,034 feet (315 m) elevation and the southeast end at 992 feet (302 m). Landing permission is handled by the Skukuza AP management company.

== Airlines and destinations ==
The only commercial flights to Skukuza are offered by Airlink, with a single daily flight to Cape Town and twice daily flights to O. R. Tambo International Airport in Johannesburg. Private and charter flights are also available, but as Skukuza has a limit of 10 landings and 10 takeoffs per day between the hours of 09:00 and 15:00, slots are limited. Flights are also required to take specific paths in order to reduce noise in sensitive natural areas.

Airlines	Destinations
Airlink	Cape Town, Johannesburg–O.R. Tambo

== History ==
Skukuza Airport was established in 1958 and began operating in 1959. In 2001, commercial flights were discontinued due to the opening of Kruger Mpumalanga International Airport near Nelspruit. Charter flights were still accepted at the airport if scheduled ahead of time. Commercial flights were reopened in the second half of 2013, and management of the airport was handed from South African National Parks to a private operator, the Skukuza Airport Management Company, which is jointly owned by Lion Sands Reserve, Federal Air and Airlink. The airport is assigned to be able to handle a maximum of six scheduled flights a day, with a maximum of 30 per week. Up to four charter flights are allowed each day. In January 2014, construction commenced on a major renovation, and the airport reopened on 2 June 2014. The airport has also been continuously used by the South African Air Force for anti-poaching efforts.

== Gallery ==
Skukuza Airport Gallery
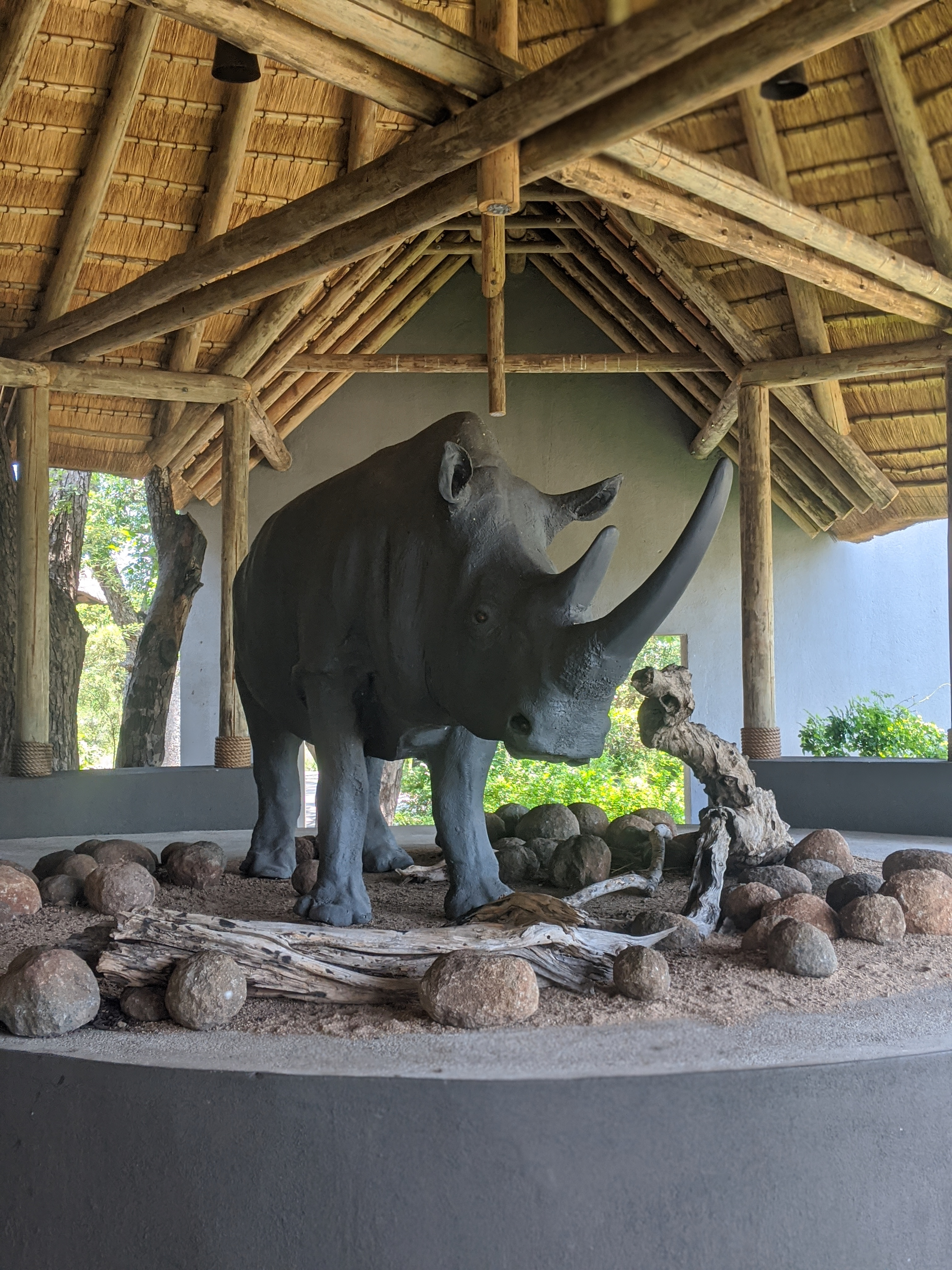
Rhino statue at entry

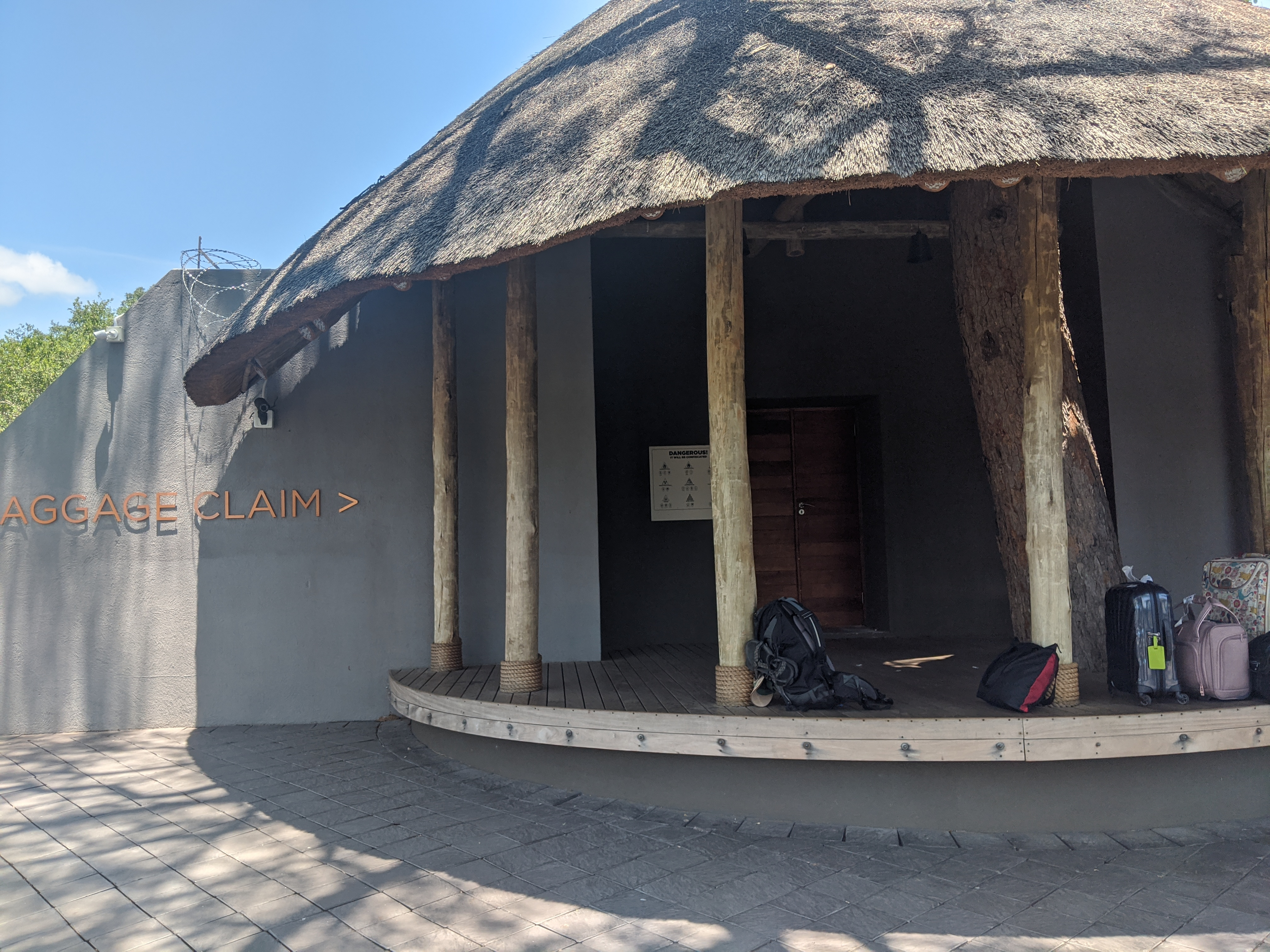
Baggage claim

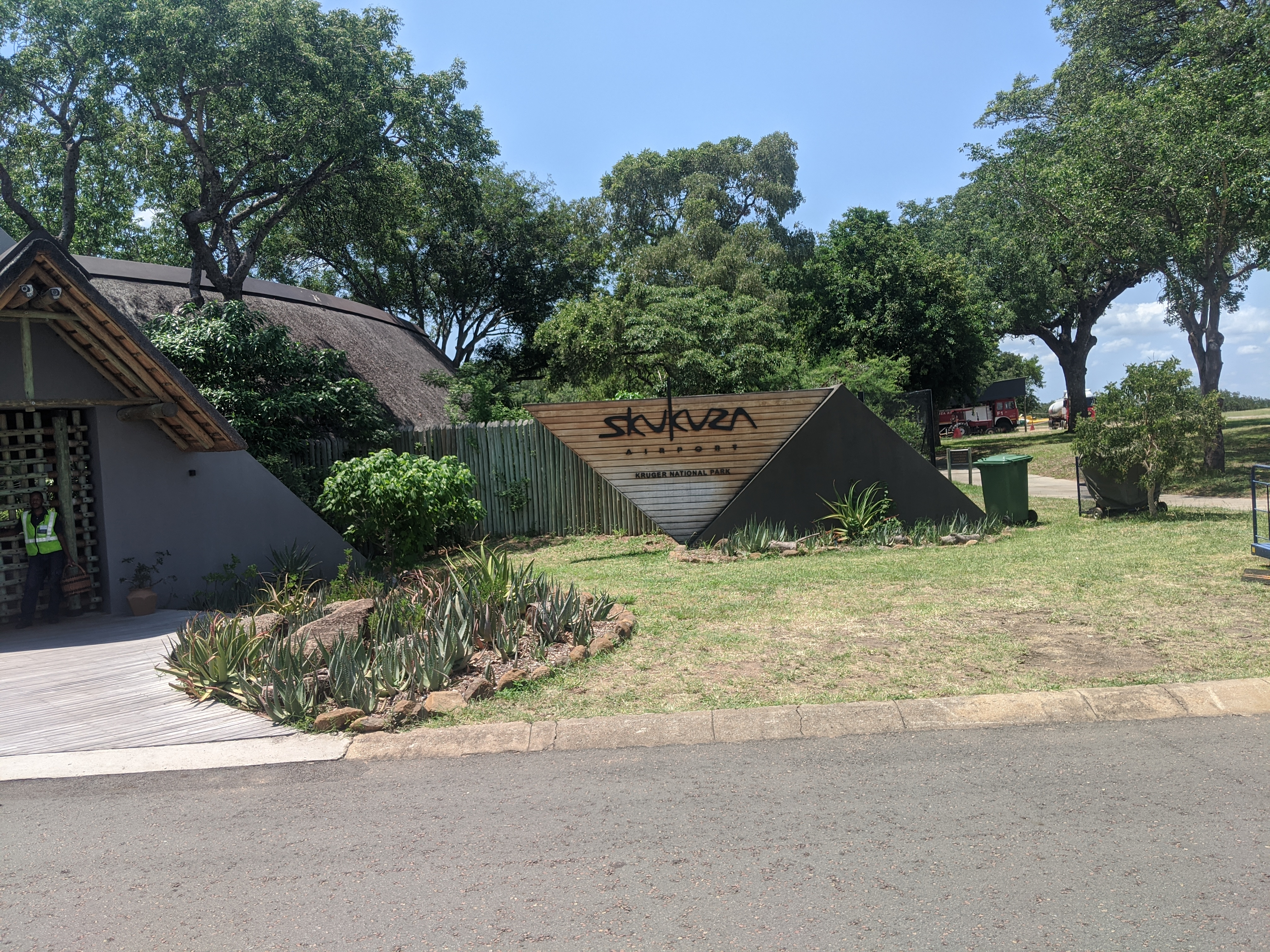
Sign visible from the runway

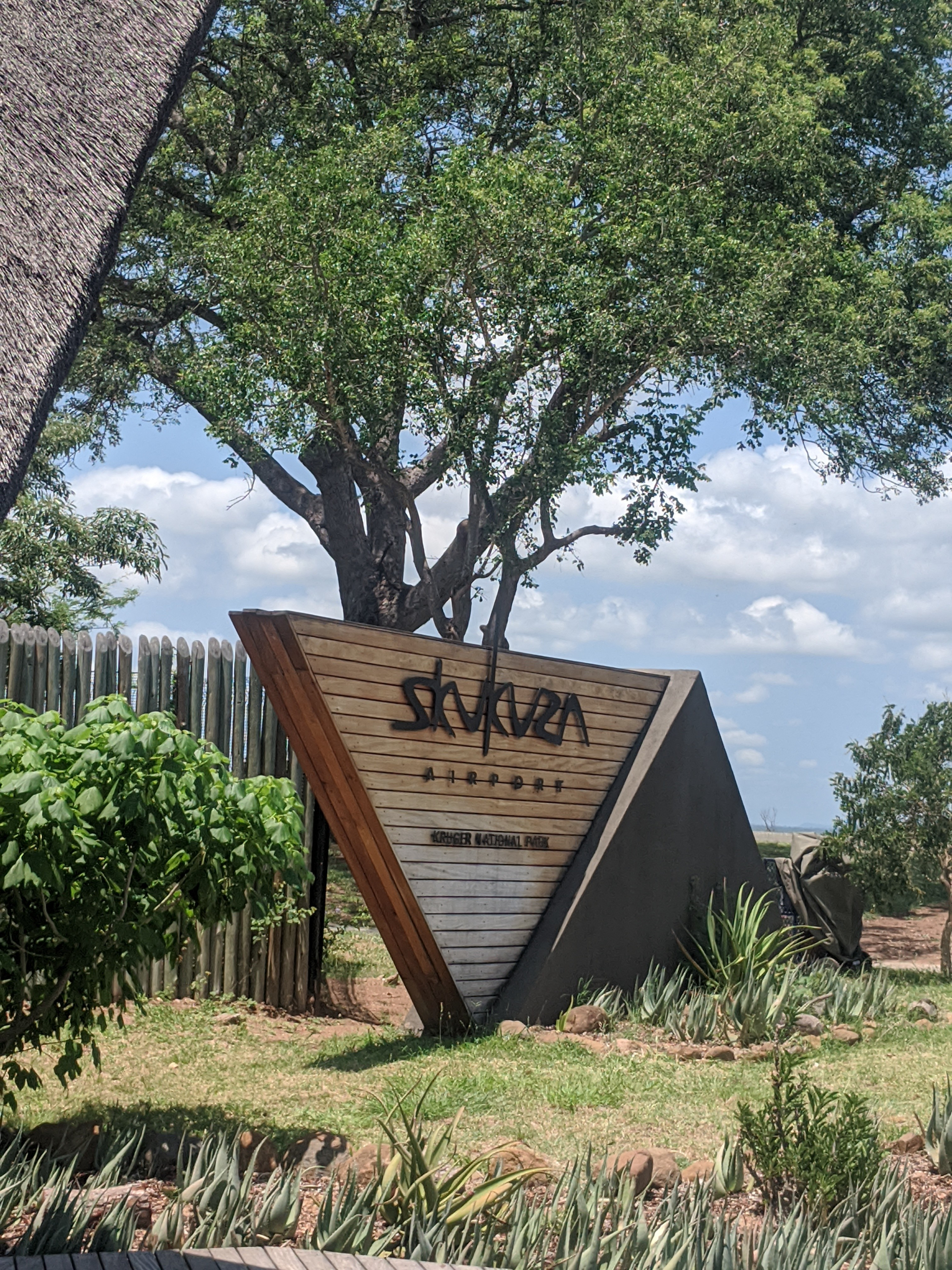
Sign as you disembark plane to building

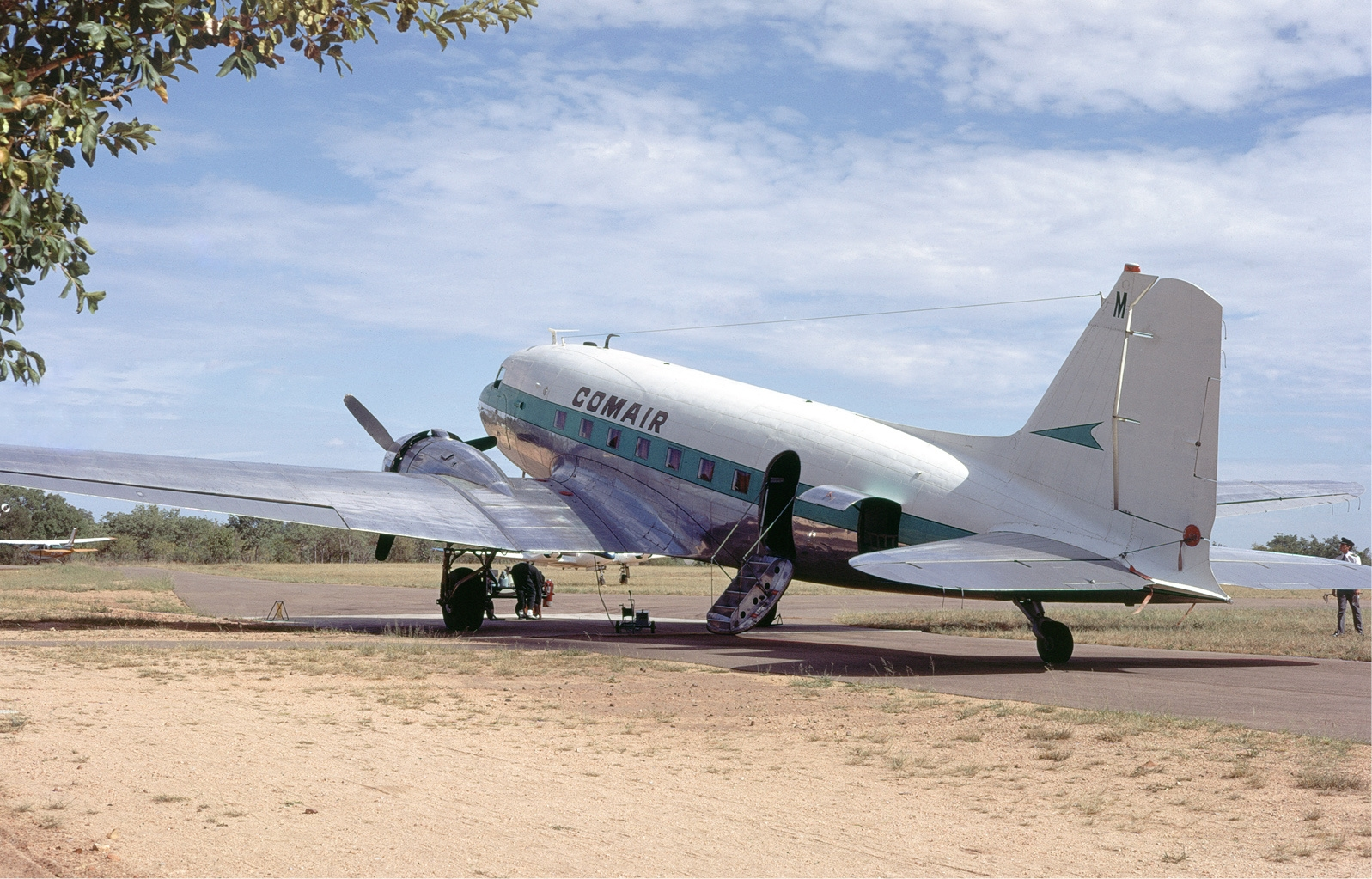
A Comair Douglas DC-3 at Skukuza in 1973
