= Pandosto =

1588 prose romance by Robert Greene

Pandosto: The Triumph of Time is a prose romance written by the English author Robert Greene, first published in 1588. A later edition of 1607 was re-titled Dorastus and Fawnia. Popular during the time of William Shakespeare, the work's plot was an inspiration for that of Shakespeare's play The Winter's Tale. Greene, in turn, may have based the work on The Clerk's Tale, one of The Canterbury Tales of Chaucer. Edward Chaney suggested that Robert Greene when writing Pandosto may have had in mind the Earl of Oxford's suspicions about the paternity of his daughter (granddaughter of Lord Burghley) when he returned in 1576 from his continental tour that may have included Sicily.

== Description ==
Greene's story contains darker elements than Shakespeare's version (who lightened the mood of the play for comic and romantic purposes).

In Greene's tale, Pandosto, King of Bohemia, accuses his wife Bellaria of adultery committed with his childhood friend, the King of Sicilia. His pursuit of this unfounded charge leads him to send his infant daughter out to sea to die and causes the death of his son and his wife. His daughter drifts to Sicilia and is saved and raised by a shepherd. Dorastus, the Prince of Sicilia, falls in love with Fawnia, unaware that she is a Princess, and they run away to marry. They land in Bohemia, where Pandosto unwittingly falls in love with his daughter Fawnia. At the end of the story, after Fawnia's identity is revealed, Pandosto commits suicide out of grief for the troubles he caused his family.

== Adaptations ==
In The Winter's Tale, Shakespeare reversed the two kingdoms of Sicilia and Bohemia and added side characters like Paulina and Antigonus. He also introduced Autolycus and the Clown. In terms of the plot, he removed the suicide and added a resurrection scene, bringing the queen back to life using either magic or a death trick, depending on interpretation.

Shakespeare was not the only playwright to adapt Pandosto; the French dramatist Alexandre Hardy produced his own version, titled Pandoste, around 1625. Hardy's play has not survived, though sketches of its scenery by Laurent Mahelot still exist. Mahelot's stage design followed the principle of "multiple setting," or décor simultané, in which a single stage set served for all of a play's scenes.

The poet Francis Sabie had paraphrased the work for a poem in two parts, and given the publication right to Robert Jones. The original titles, altered for 1607 edition, were The Fishermans Tale: Of the famous Actes, Life, and Loue of Cassander, a Grecian Knight, 1595. and Flora's Fortune. The second part and finishing of the Fisher-mans Tale.
