= Sabie (surname) =

Sabie is a surname. Notable people with the surname include:

- Camille Sabie (1902–1998), American athlete
- Francis Sabie (fl. 1595), English poet
