= N'waswitshaka River =

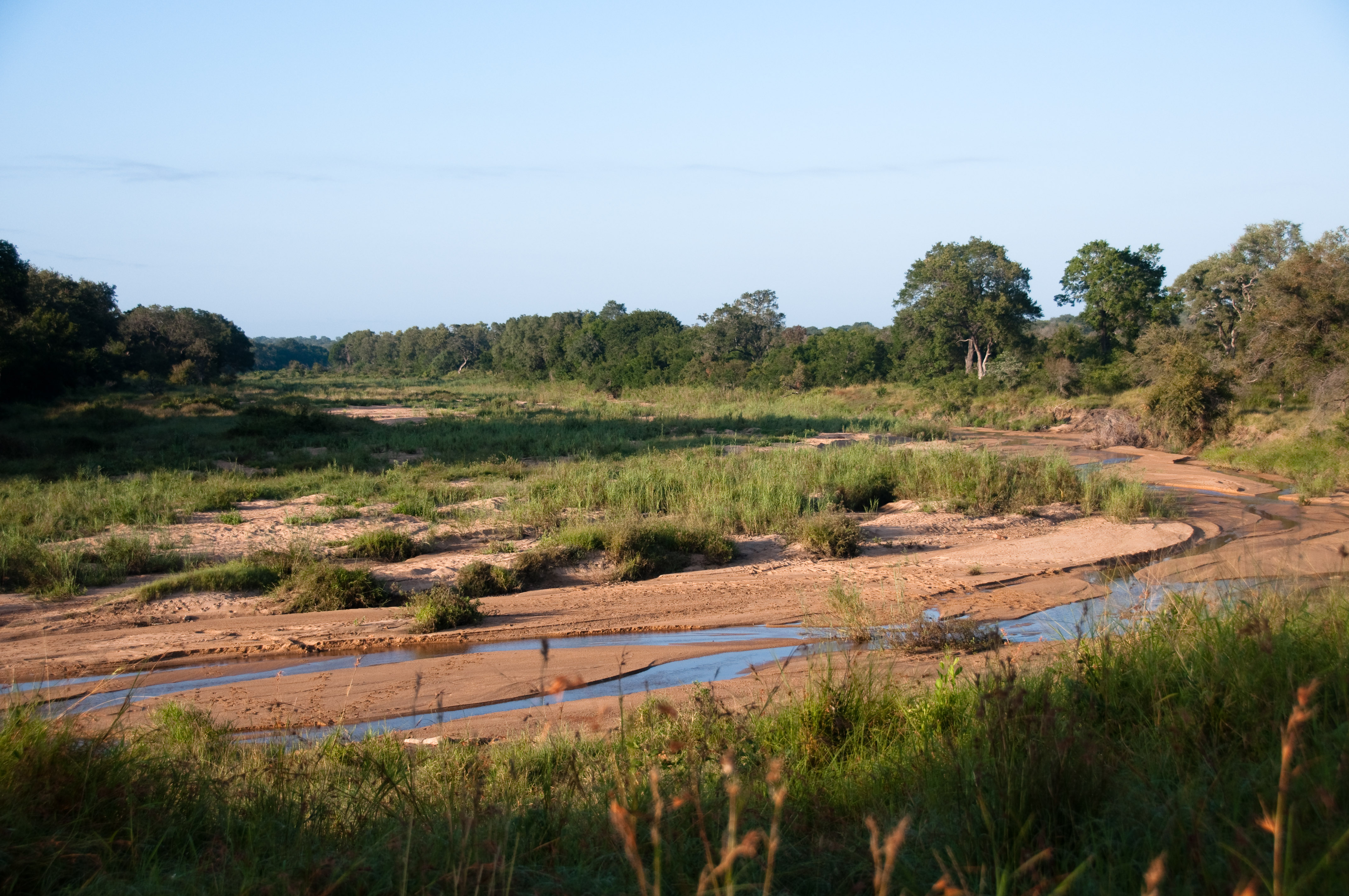
- N'waswitshaka River southwest of Skukuza

Location
- Country: South Africa
- Province: Mpumalanga

Physical characteristics
- Source
  - location: Pretoriuskop, eastern Mpumalanga, South Africa
  - coordinates: 25°09′22″S 31°17′02″E
- Mouth: Sabie River
  - location: Skukuza
  - coordinates: 24°59′23″S 31°35′20″E

Basin features
- River system: Sabie River

The N'waswitshaka River (formerly N'waswitsake) and its tributaries are completely contained in the southern Kruger Park, Mpumalanga, South Africa. It has its origin near Pretoriuskop and joins the Sabie River at Skukuza. The name means "the happy one" in Xitsonga, and is said to relate to an individual who always smiled.

== Research camp ==
Near Skukuza's staff village is the N'waswitshaka research camp, which provides accommodation for visiting researchers and their guests. The facilities are comparable to the rondavels, chalets and campsites in the main camp, but are entirely self-serve. Additional resources such as an office facility with internet access and game guards are available for researchers if required.

== Gallery ==
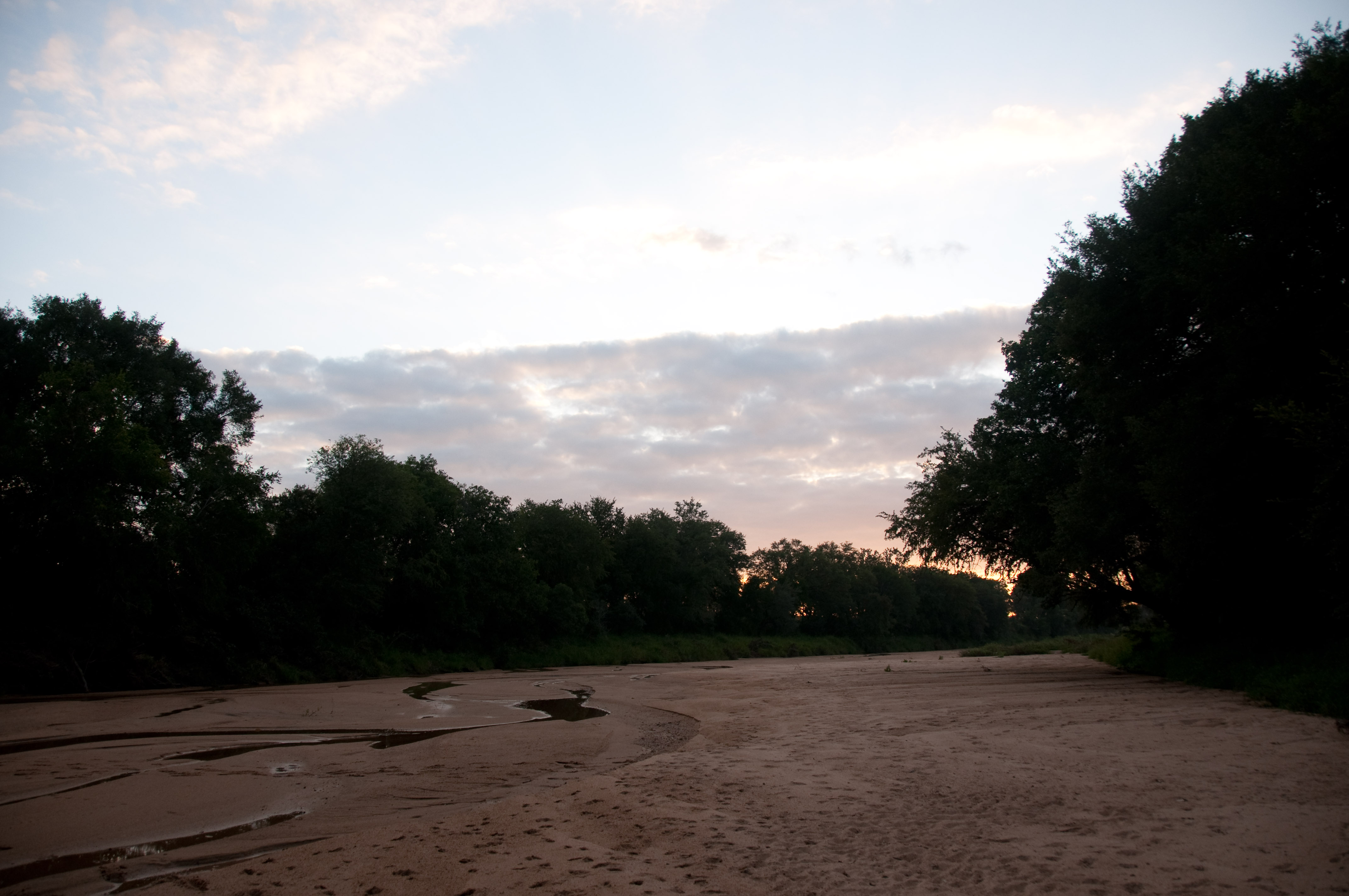
The river at dawn

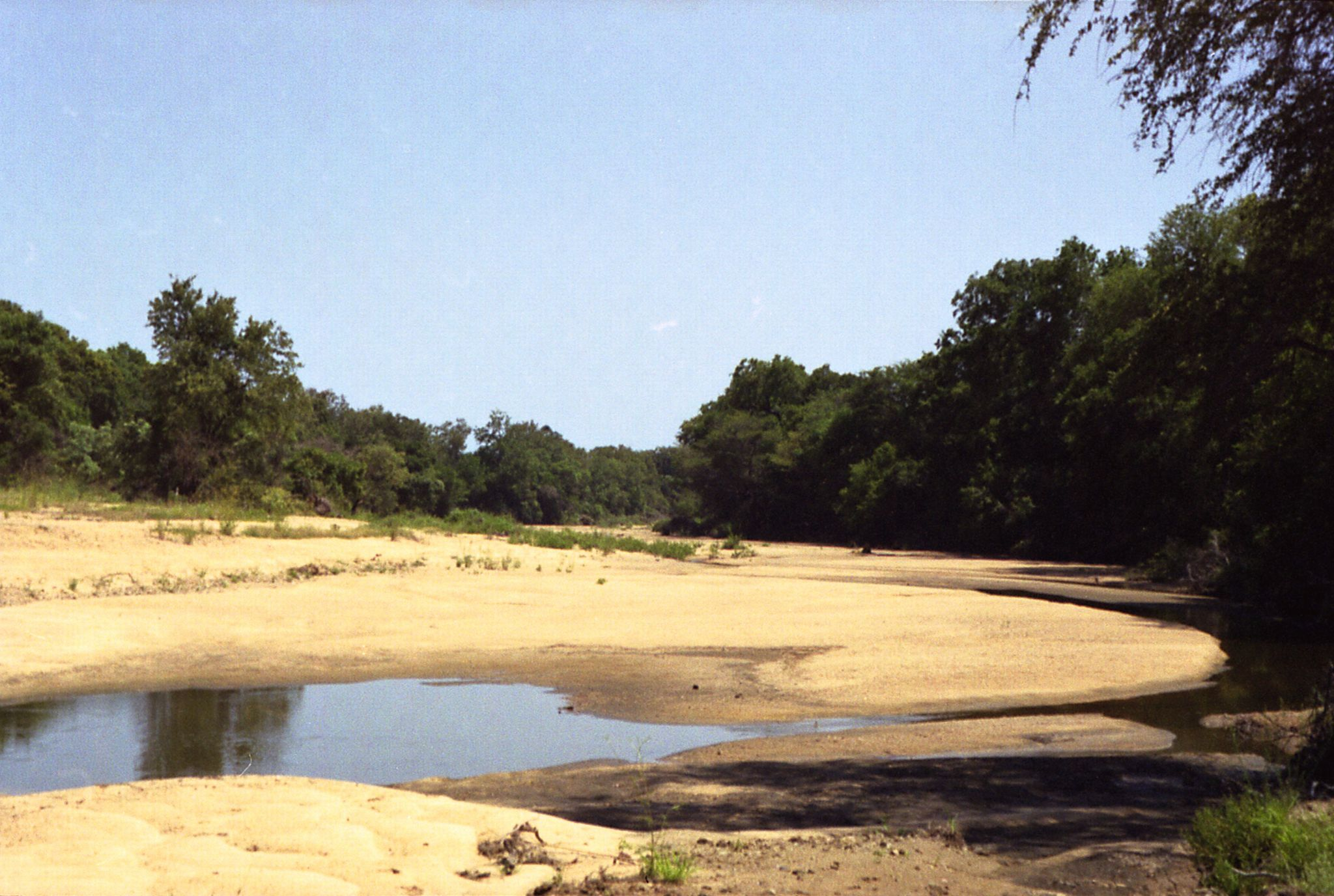
Shrinking pools in the river

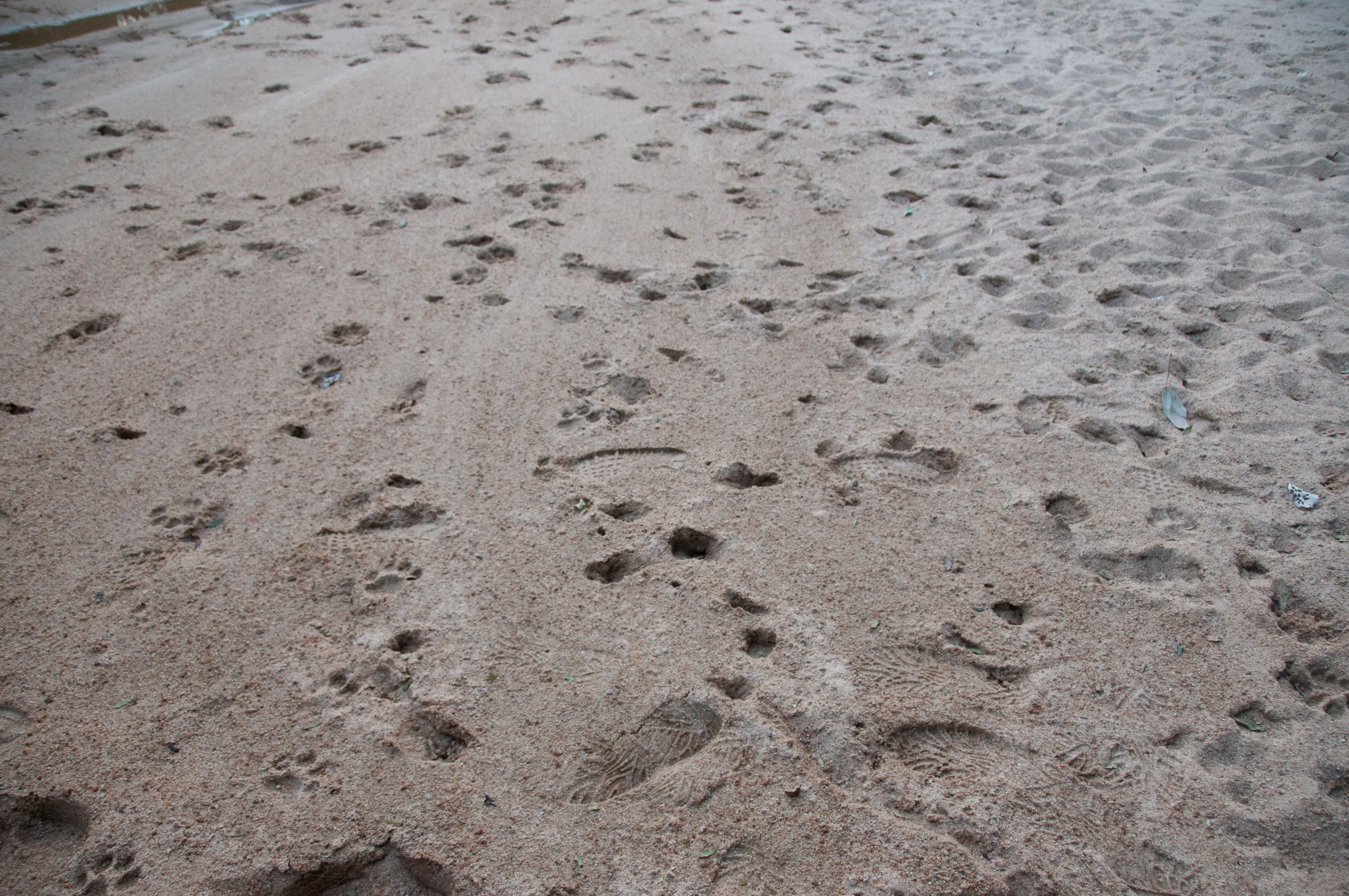
Animal and human tracks in the sand
