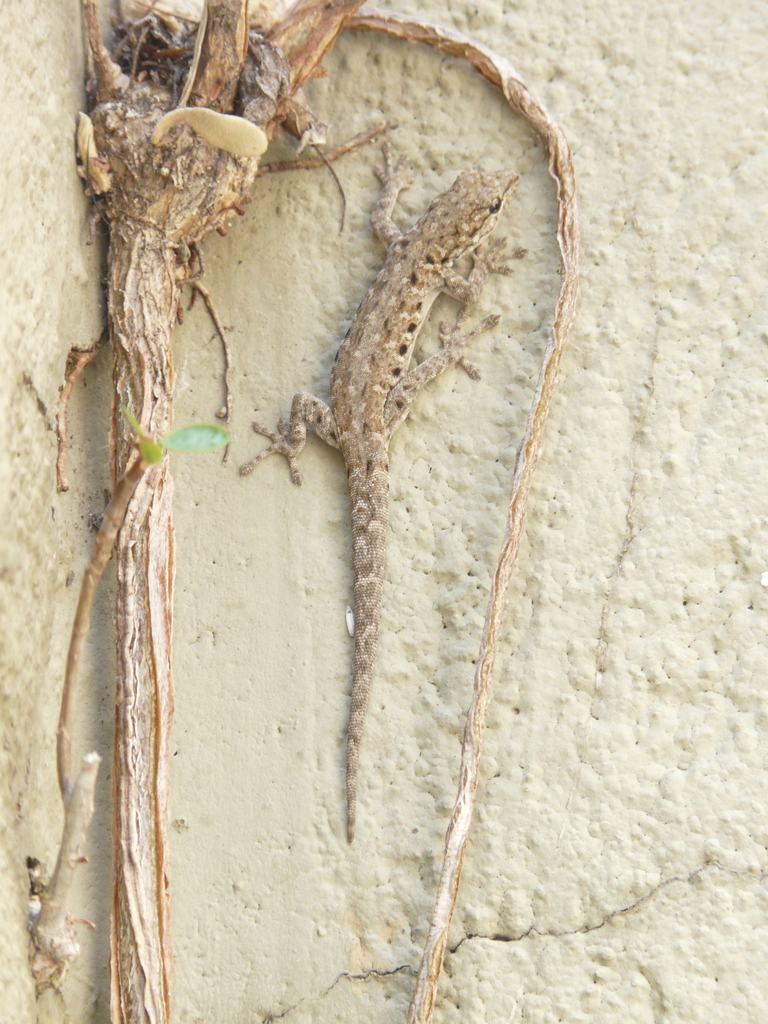

Scientific classification
- Kingdom: Animalia
- Phylum: Chordata
- Class: Reptilia
- Order: Squamata
- Suborder: Gekkota
- Family: Gekkonidae
- Genus: Lygodactylus
- Species: L. stevensoni

Binomial name
- Lygodactylus stevensoni Hewitt, 1926

= Stevenson's dwarf gecko =

Species of lizard

Stevenson's dwarf gecko (Lygodactylus stevensoni) is a species of lizard in the family Gekkonidae. The species is native to southern Africa.

== Etymology ==
The specific name, stevensoni, is in honor of James Stevenson-Hamilton, the "father" of Kruger National Park.

== Geographic range ==
L. stevensoni is found in northeastern South Africa and southwestern Zimbabwe.

== Habitat ==
The preferred natural habitat of L. stevensoni is wooded granite-hills, where it is found on rocks and beneath the bark of dead trees.

== Description ==
Adults of L. stevensoni have a snout-to-vent length (SVL) of 3–4 cm (1.2–1.6 in).

== Reproduction ==
L. stevensoni is oviparous.
