= Lion Sands Reserve =

Coordinates: 24°57′S 31°31′E

Lion Sands Reserve is situated in Sabi Sand Game Reserve and Kruger National Park, Mpumalanga.

Lion Sands Private Game Reserve, also known as Lion Sands Reserve, was established in 1933 by Guy Aubrey Chalkley. It forms part of both the Sabi Sands Private Game Reserve and the Kruger National Park, which together with some other parks make up the Greater Kruger National Park in South Africa.

== Wildlife ==
The wildlife in this park includes the Big Five. The preserved plains of the Sabi Sands and the Kruger National Park hold one of the planet's highest concentrations of game per hectare. This, coupled with ethical and responsible conservation management, has resulted in animals that are highly habituated to human presence. Land Rovers can get close to countless animal species, including predators, general game, reptiles, insects, and birds.

== History ==
Guy Aubrey Chalkley, affectionately known as Chalk, was a keen hunter and traveled extensively throughout Africa. It was on one such adventure that he stumbled across Kingstown. Belonging to the Transvaal Consolidated Lands, this was a property situated on the border of the Kruger National Park. These were the same lands that became the basis of the world-famous Sabi Sand Wildtuin (Game Reserve).

Chalkley was filled with affection for the animals around him and with admiration for the pristine condition of the Kingstown property. He never lifted a rifle to an animal in this reserve. Chalkley purchased the property on 25 November 1933 from Transvaal Consolidated Mines for four thousand pounds and fourteen shillings.

John More, who married Chalkley's granddaughter, Louise Chalkley, introduced Kingstown to the public in 1978 when he built two camps: River Lodge and Bush Lodge. Even during those early days of extremely basic bush operations, the More family concentrated on keeping Kingstown in its pristine state.

Today, the family employs a full-time ecologist (the only reserve in the Sabi Sand Wildtuin to do so) to monitor the effect of commercialization on the wilderness.

== Accommodation ==
The game reserve has 4 game lodges:

- Ivory Lodge is an intimate luxury lodge with 9 private Villas (each with a heated plunge pool, deck, and lounge area) along the banks of the Sabie River within the Sabi Sand Reserve.
- Tinga Lodge is a luxury lodge with 9 private Suites (each with a plunge pool, lounge, and deck) along the Sabie River in the Kruger National Park.
- Narina Lodge is a luxury lodge with 9 private Suites (each with a plunge pool, lounge, and deck) along the Sabie River in the Kruger National Park.
- River Lodge is a lodge with 20 deluxe suites with either bush or Sabie River views.

== See also ==
- Sabi Sand Private Game Reserve
- Kruger National Park
