= Sand River (Mpumalanga) =

Sand River Manyeleti River
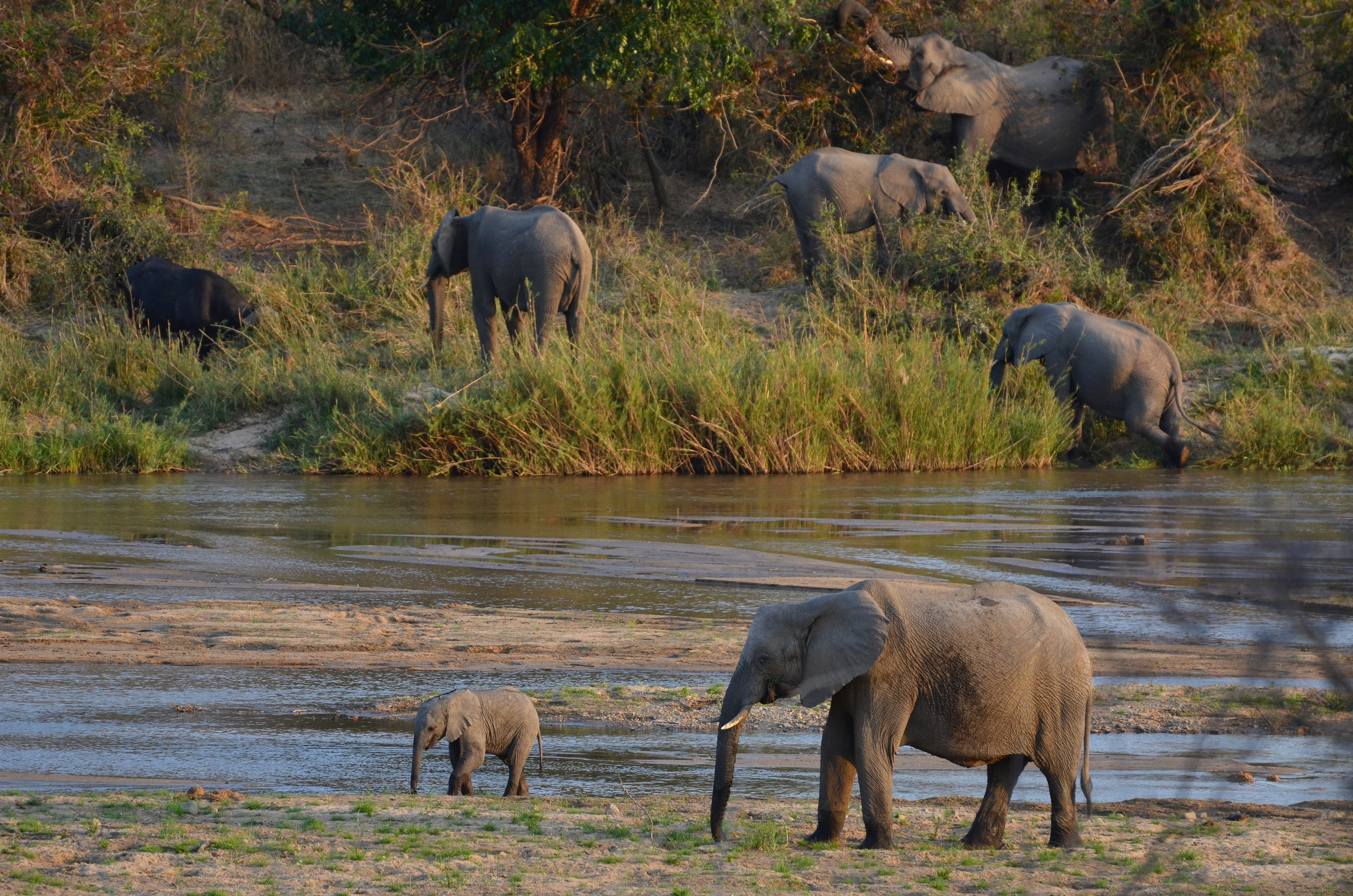

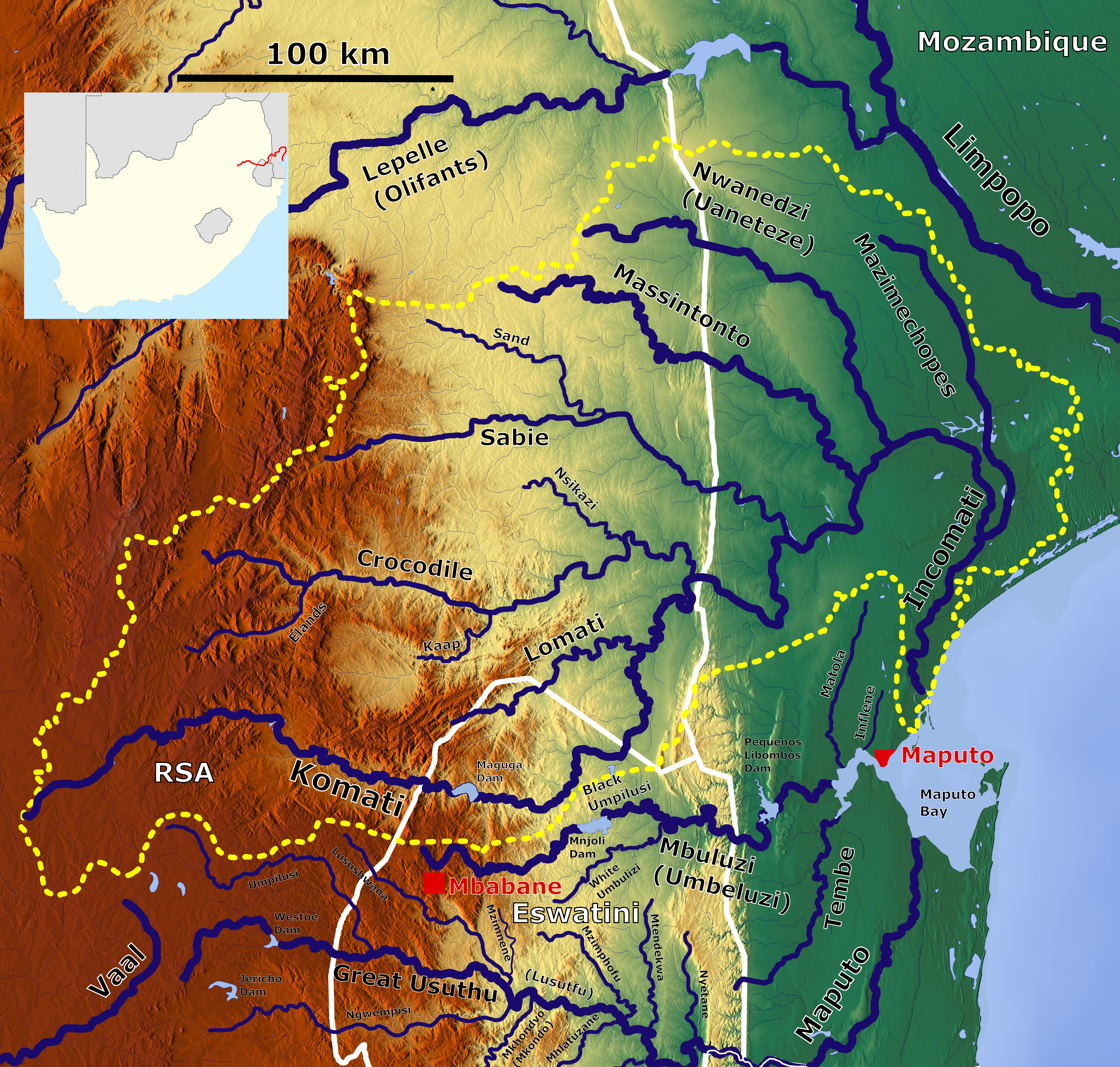
- The Sand River in the Komati catchment (uper center)

Location
- Country: South Africa
- State: Mpumalanga
- Municipality: Bushbuckridge

Physical characteristics
- Source
  - location: Drakensberg, Mpumalanga, South Africa
- Mouth: Sabie River
  - location: Skukuza, Kruger National Park, South Africa
  - coordinates: 24°57′25″S 31°42′39.6″E

Basin features
- River system: Sabie River
- Tributaries
  - left: Klein Sand River
  - right: Mutlumuvi River

The Sand River (or Manyeleti River) is a river in the Mpumalanga lowveld flowing south-eastwards through the Sabi Sand Game Reserve for 50 km (31 mi) and joining the Sabie River 30 km (19 mi) east of Skukuza rest camp in the Kruger National Park.

The catchment area of the whole Sabie-Sand system is 6,320 km^{2} (2,440 sq mi).

== Tributaries ==
- Hukumurhi
- Kapen
- Manyeleti
- Matsaphiri
- Khokhovela River
- Klein Sand River
- Lephong
- Magoso
- Phungwe
- Merry Pebble Stream
- Mlowati
- Molapakgomo
- Mutlumuvi River
- Snuifspruit
