= Francis Sabie =

English Poet

Francis Sabie (fl. 1595) was an English poet.

Sabie was a schoolmaster at Lichfield in 1587 (Arber, Stationers' Registers, ii. 146). He published three volumes of verse—two in 1595, and one in 1596.

His earliest publication, in two parts, was The Fishermans Tale: Of the famous Actes, Life, and Loue of Cassander, a Grecian Knight, 1595. The second part bears the heading Flora's Fortune. The second part and finishing of the Fisher-mans Tale. The poem, which was licensed for publication to Richard Jones on 11 Nov. 1594, is a paraphrase in blank verse of Pandosto, afterwards renamed Dorastus and Fawnia, a romance by Robert Greene (1560?–1592). A reprint from a Bodleian manuscript, limited to ten copies, was issued by James Orchard Halliwell (afterwards Halliwell-Phillipps) in 1867.

Later in 1595 there appeared Pan's Pipe, Three Pastorall Eglogues in English Hexameter, with other poetical verses delightfull. The publisher was again Richard Jones, who obtained a license for the publication on 11 Jan. 1594–5 (Arber, ii. 668). The prose epistle To all youthful Gentlemen, Apprentises, fauourers of the diuine Arte of sense-delighting Poesie, is signed F. S. The hexameters run satisfactorily.

In his third volume, which contains three separate works, Sabie showed for the first time his capacity in rhyme. The book was entitled Adams Complaint. The Olde Worldes Tragedie. Dauid and Bathsheba, London, by Richard Jones, 1596, 4to. These poems, which are in rhyming stanzas (each consisting of three heroic couplets), versify scripture. The Olde Worldes Tragedie is the story of the flood. The volume is dedicated to Dr. Howland, bishop of Peterborough.

Copies of Sabie's three books—all extremely rare—are in the British Museum and at Britwell. The British Museum copies of The Fisher-mans Tale and Flora's Fortune, which are in fine condition, were acquired from Sir Charles Isham's collection in 1894 (Times, 31 Aug. 1895; Bibliographica, iii. 418–29).

Sabie's son Edmond was apprenticed to Robert Cullen, a London stationer, 12 June 1587 (Arber, ii. 146), and was admitted a freeman on 5 Aug. 1594.
