= Skukuza =

- Town
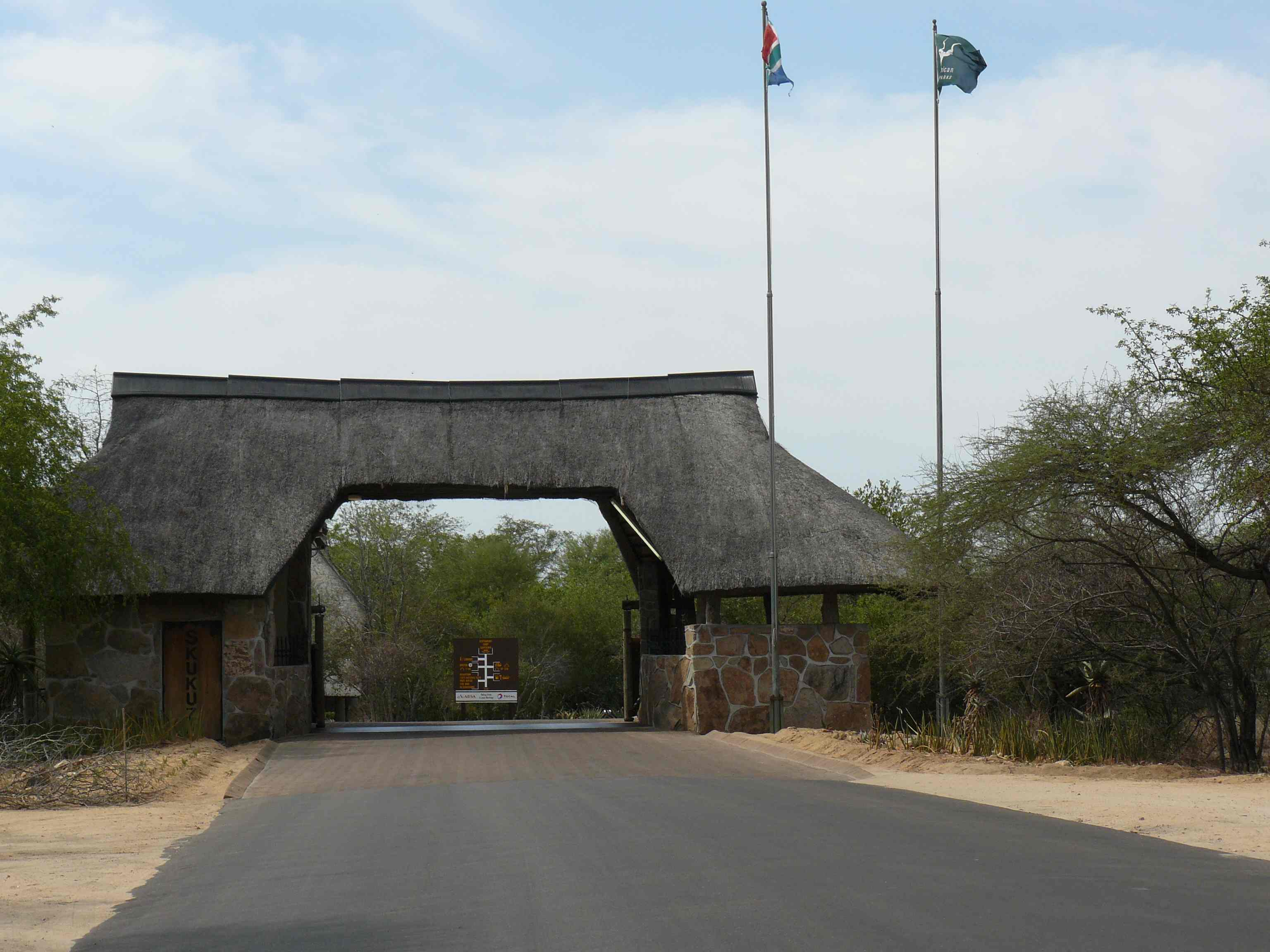
- Camp entrance at Skukuza

- Location within Mpumalanga Location within South Africa Location within Africa
- Coordinates: 24°59′45″S 31°35′31″E
- Country: South Africa
- Province: Mpumalanga
- District: Ehlanzeni
- Municipality: Mbombela

Government
  - Type: Ward 39
  - Councillor: Dudu Tryphinah Nkosi

Area
  - Total: 4.98 km^{2} (1.92 sq mi)

Population (2011)
  - Total: 1,599
  - Density: 321/km^{2} (832/sq mi)

Racial makeup (2011)
  - Black African: 83.9%
  - Coloured: 1.6%
  - Indian/Asian: 0.1%
  - White: 14.4%

First languages (2011)
  - Tsonga: 58.0%
  - Swazi: 9.7%
  - Afrikaans: 9.5%
  - English: 7.7%
  - Other: 15.2%
- Time zone: UTC+2 (SAST)
- PO box: 1350

Skukuza Rest Camp
- Interactive map of Skukuza Rest Camp
- Location: South bank of the Sabie River, near Paul Kruger Gate, Kruger National Park
- Elevation: 281 m (922 ft)
- Campsites: 80 tent or caravan sites
- Residences: 12 two-bed and 8 four-bed furnished tents; 178 two- or three-bed rondavels; 20 one-bedroom bungalows; 15 four- or six-bed guest cottages; 1 four-bedroom family cottage (Waterkant 2); 3 four-bedroom guest houses (Moni, Myathi, Waterkant 1); ABSA guest house (6 bedrooms)
- Restaurants: Cattle Baron, Selati
- Operated by: South African National Parks
- Established: 1926
- Website: www.sanparks.org/parks/kruger/camps/skukuza/

Skukuza (formerly Reserve, Sabi Bridge and Sikhukhuza), a town in Mpumalanga located 57 km (35 mi) east of Hazyview at the confluence of the N'waswitshaka and Sabie Rivers, is the administrative headquarters of the Kruger National Park.

It is also the largest rest camp of the park. It is South Africa's number one game viewing destination and is the most popular game reserve in the country. It is popular with domestic and foreign tourists alike, as the big five game are in relative abundance when compared to other game reserves in the country. The game reserve is situated in a medium rainfall area (770 mm (30 in) of rainfall per year), on the well-wooded banks of the Sabie and N'waswitshaka rivers of Mpumalanga Province.

== History ==
Before the park was established, the area was home to a few resident tribes and others who were recently employed to build the railway line. The Ngomane clan and assimilated Sambo people lived in the vicinity of present-day Skukuza. The Ngomane clan, formerly subjects of Soshangane, joined forces with the Sambo people and took refuge near the Sabie River after a defeat by Sotho people near Makhulukhulu mountain on the escarpment. Chief Ngomane's people lived near Skukuza until 1905, when the Transvaal Government relocated them to Tenbosch south of the park, where they were displaced again in 1945. Other inhabitants were resettled in villages around Hazyview, such as Hoxani, Cunningmore, Mkhuhlu and the greater Hazyview area. The resident peoples of the area hunted animals with bows and arrows as well as snares, and eventually rifles obtained from the white men. They used the Sabie River for fishing. Before relocations, Tsonga people occupied the region east of Hazyview, where the majority of private game reserves in Mpumalanga are situated today.

When the government decided to establish a national park during the late 1800s and early 1900s, they sent James Stevenson-Hamilton as the only government official. British troops still occupied the area that today forms the southern part of the park after the Second Boer War. In particular, one of the locations of a British forward position was at the Sabie River in an old block house. After the troops were disbanded, Stevenson-Hamilton decided to make this location his base of operations. The government moved the Tsonga people to villages on the outskirts of Hazyview.

The name "Skukuza" was given to James Stevenson-Hamilton by his staff, the local Tsonga people, as a nickname. It could be translated as 'to sweep', since Stevenson-Hamilton was perceived to sweep the land clean of poachers and other criminals operating in the area. But according to Dr Henri-Alexandre Junod, an expert in Tsonga history, the name Skukuza reflects the Tsonga people's attitude and resentment towards forced removal from their beautiful and fertile land.

After the Kruger National Park was declared in 1926, the presence of the Selati Railway, which connected Komatipoort to Tzaneen, was considered a potential disruption for the animals. As such, the railway was dismantled. The old bridge across the Sabie River can still be seen from Skukuza.

== Facilities ==
Being the largest rest camp in the Kruger National Park and a village in its own right, Skukuza boasts more facilities than any other camp. As a village of over a thousand people and the administrative headquarters of Kruger Park, Skukuza also includes the types of local services one would expect from a village, including a police station, a bank branch (First National Bank), and a court. The court was opened in April 2017 and was scheduled to close in October 2019 with cases moving to Mbombela (Nelspruit), but the decision was placed under moratorium in September 2019 due to its success in swift conviction of poachers (with a 99.8% conviction rate).

Skukuza also has a number of historical sites including 3 museums and a library, besides a camp centre consisting of shops and restaurants. The Selati Train restaurant is situated on an old train platform on the eastern verge of the camp. From the main reception a visitor can organize game drives, bush braais, and guided walks in Kruger. Besides the camp basics, Skukuza also has 2 swimming pools, a golf course, library, minor motor repairs, police station, post office and even a bank. These shops and facilities are surrounded by different sized huts, larger guest houses, as well as a rustic camping terrain.

There is an airport 5 km (3.1 mi) away, called Skukuza Airport, with direct flights from Cape Town and Johannesburg on a daily basis. South African National Parks (SANParks) acquired 4 helicopters, which are based at Skukuza, in order to assist with anti rhino poaching and other wildlife operations from the sky.

=== Shop ===
Whilst most of the main camps at Kruger have a Parks Shop, the one at Skukuza is by far the biggest. The shop sells a variety of supplies, including groceries, prepackaged meals, snacks such as nuts and biltong, ice cream, and drinks (both alcoholic and non-alcoholic). It also sells a variety of park guides and curios.

=== Restaurants ===
Skukuza is the only camp at Kruger with a choice of multiple restaurants. In the central area of the camp overlooking the Sabie River is a well-appointed Cattle Baron restaurant, one of four in South Africa's National parks. (The others are at Storms River mouth in Tsitsikamma, Satara Rest Camp in Kruger National Park and in the main camp at Addo Elephant Park.)

In the 1980s, a train was donated to Skukuza by South African Railways, which was converted into a second restaurant, Selati. The restaurant was destroyed by a fire on 12 January 1995 and the area was closed to visitors. At some point between then and 2006, the restaurant reopened as the Selati Station Grillhouse. In 2017 the station was placed under private management, and in December 2019 a train-themed hotel, the Shalati Hotel, was opened on the tracks as well.

=== Skukuza Indigenous Plant Nursery ===
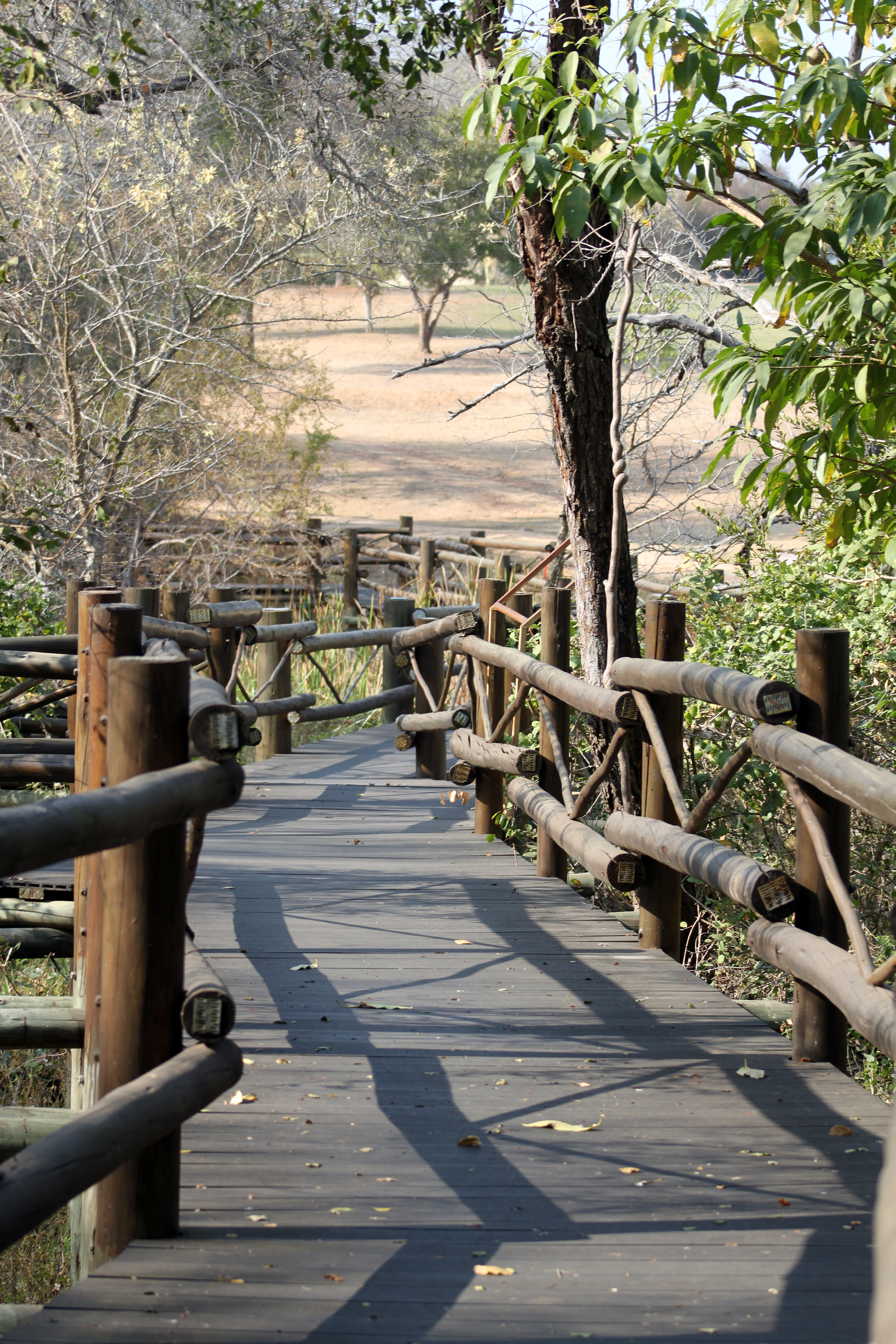
Wetlands Boardwalk at the Skukuza Indigenous Plant Nursery

The Skukuza Indigenous Plant Nursery, located 4 km from the main camp near the golf club, is a nursery dedicated to the cultivation of indigenous plants. Established in August 1975 by Harry Matthysen, the original nursery was placed on a 100 m × 45 m (328 ft × 148 ft) plot of land. In 1983 the nursery was moved to its current location. The nursery has a wide selection of plants for sale, with over 1.2 million individual plants in their collection, which originally began with roughly 3,000 plants. As it is run by the SANParks Scientific Services Department, the nursery also performs a broad spectrum of botanical research. A wetlands boardwalk is also available, allowing visitors to take in a rehabilited wetland area up close. The nursery is open 7 days a week, including on public holidays (except for Christmas Day). The Lowveld Honorary Rangers run the parks on weekends and holidays. The nursery holds regular events for related holidays. There are also picnic tables, toilets, and ice cream for sale.

=== Library ===
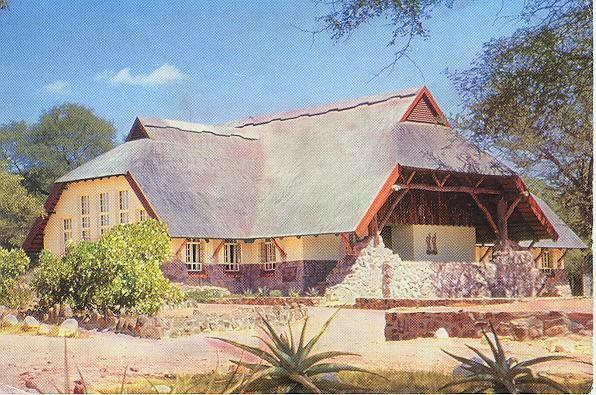
Stevenson-Hamilton Memorial Library, Skukuza

The Stevenson-Hamilton Memorial Library and Museum at Skukuza houses a selection of ecological and history-related books, as well as paintings, documents and artifacts related to the history of Kruger National Park and the area. The library was opened on 14 October 1961 and is a brief walk from the Cattle Baron and reception. The hand knife used to kill a lion which attacked legendary ranger Harry Wolhuter, as well as the lion's skin, are on display in the Stevenson-Hamilton Library.

=== Sports ===
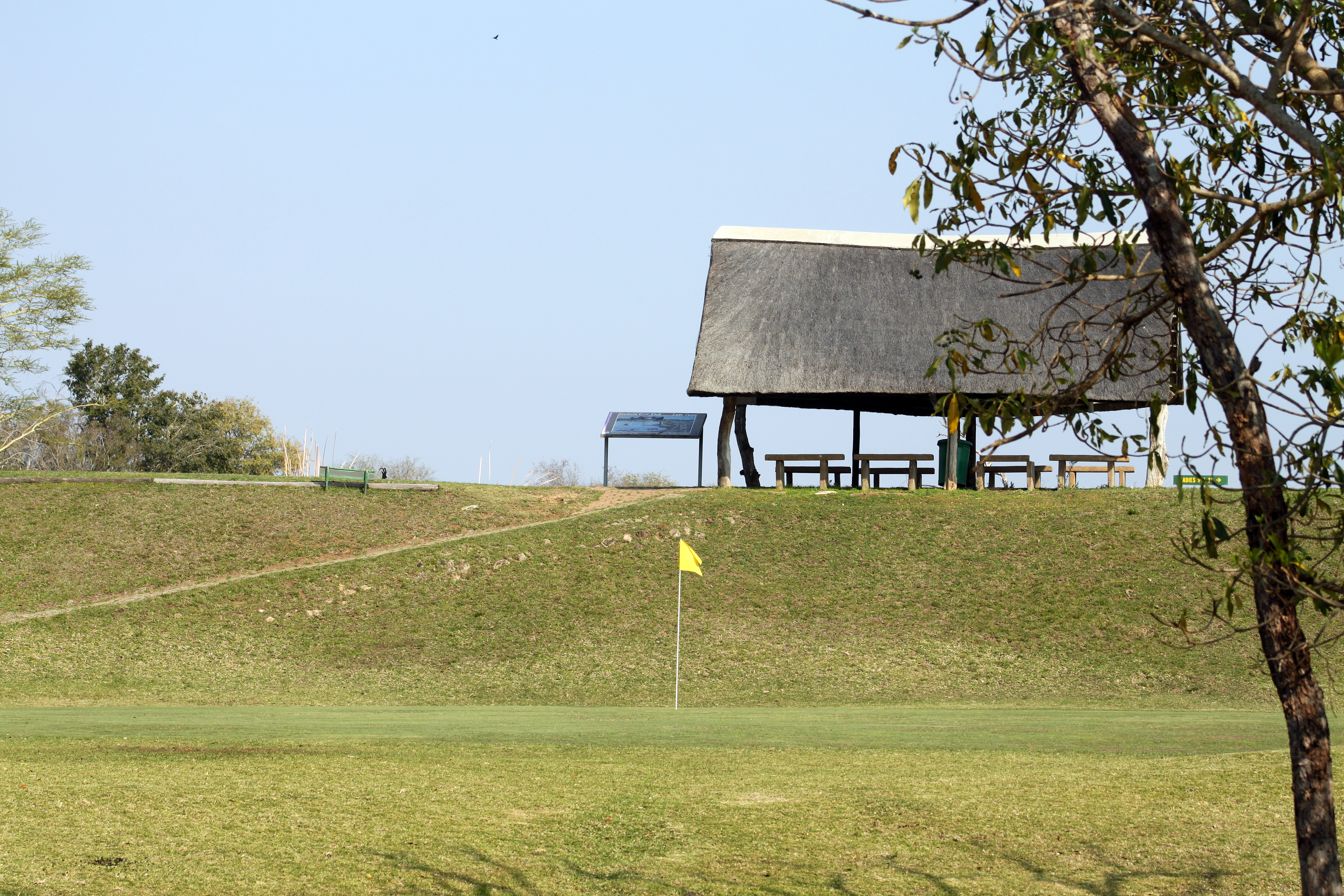
A shaded pavilion at Skukuza Golf Course

Quite unique to Skukuza is a full 9-hole golf course near Lake Panic. Originally built as a recreational facility for employees at the camp, Skukuza Golf Course is now open to the public. The course is not fenced in, meaning it's fairly common to see impala, warthog, baboons or even hippo on the golf course. Play has been stopped multiple times due to predators on the fairway. In 2014, a 29 year old son of a park employee was killed while retrieving golf balls from a lake. Because of the potential danger, players must sign an indemnity form prior to playing.

Skukuza also has its own cricket club, which has hosted several teams from around South Africa and from abroad. Skukuza hosts occasional cricket matches against teams from the surrounding area of Mpumalanga and other South African national parks as fundraisers. The cricket field is unfenced like the golf course, and at least one leopard kill has had to be removed from the field. Because the cricket field is in the Skukuza staff village, cricket can only be played by invitation.

=== Little Heroes Acre ===
The Little Heroes Acre is a small dog cemetery in Skukuza paying homage to the working dogs who have helped Kruger Park through its days. Several of the graves tell stories about the dogs, such as Tessa, who fostered three lion cubs and eventually was killed by a black mamba while rescuing a human.

=== Conference Facilities ===
Skukuza has two separate conference facilities, which can support groups of varying sizes. The Goldfields auditorium is a single theatre room with rear projection facilities that can seat up to 158 people. The newer Nombolo Mdhuli Conference Centre, which was built as part of the SANParks commercialisation strategy, is significantly larger.

==== Nombolo Mdhuli Conference Centre ====
The Nombolo Mdhuli Conference Centre, named after a corporal who served in the park from 1919 until 1958, was built in the early 2000s to provide a larger, more modern conference facility at Skukuza with facilities for up to 500 people, with up to four breakaway rooms with a variety of configurations. This conference centre is also air conditioned. The facility has hosted multiple international conferences, including the 15th Annual Savanna Science Network Meeting in 2017 and the 2019 Species on the Move conference.

=== Medical Facilities ===
A private medical practice, Kruger Park Doctors, serves residents and visitors at Skukuza and surrounding areas. Special dispensation to enter Kruger Park via Paul Kruger Gate in order to visit the doctor is provided, as long as the doctors' receptionist stamps the form. The doctors also provide 24-hour emergency services. The closest full hospital is Nelspruit Medi-Clinic, a 260-bed private hospital. Skukuza Airport has an air ambulance, which allows quick transport to hospitals such as that in Nelspruit.

== Activities ==
As the biggest camp in the park with a sleeping capacity well in excess of 500, Skukuza offers a wider variety of activities than most of the camps in the park. This comes at the cost of having to share activities with many others, which is less likely at the smaller lodges. Skukuza also has an AM Spa, which is open seven days a week.

=== Game drives and bush walks ===
Like most of the major camps at Kruger, Skukuza offers game drives, split into the options of sunrise drives, sunset drives, and night drives. All-day drives can also be booked ahead of time, subject to driver availability.

Skukuza offers guided morning walks much like those at other camps. Trained field guides will take groups of up to 8 adults into the bush for several hours, where they will track large game on foot. Unlike most other camps, Skukuza also offers afternoon walks, which are considered by reviewers at Getaway Magazine to be some of the best walk experiences in Kruger.^{a} These afternoon walks typically leave at 4 PM.

==== Metsi-Metsi Wilderness Trail ====
Skukuza the hosting site of the Metsi-Metsi Wilderness Trail. This 2 day (3 night) hiking trip begins with a drive to the first trailhead near the Mozambique border, where the first night's camp is set up. The next two days consist of morning and evening hikes, with a break in the middle of the day. This trail crosses the Lindanda plains, where black rhino, cheetah and lion are common, as well as plains birds such as ostrich, kori bustard and secretary birds. Marula and knobthorn trees are quite dominant on the landscape. The camps on these hikes are not fenced in and have no electricity - simply four A-frame huts for guests. Lunches and dinners are prepared by cooks at each camp.

In 2008, trail ranger Rudi Lorist was attacked by a lioness on the trail near camp. Lorist was flown to Nelspruit Medi Clinic for treatment. This incident was used in the 9 March 2011 episode of the Animal Planet TV Series I'm Alive, where Lorist was played by actor Feikamoh Massaquoi.

=== Bush Braai ===
Skukuza, like many other camps at Kruger, provides bush braais and bush breakfasts for interested visitors. A bush braai begins with an afternoon game drive, followed by a traditional South African braai in an unfenced area open to the wild, with rangers as protection. Beverages cost extra, but are available at the braai. Participants must be at least 12 years of age, and availability is limited, as the bush braai can only take place if at least 6 visitors sign up, but cannot accommodate more than 12. After the braai, a short night drive takes guests back to the camp. The excursion typically lasts a total of 3-3.5 hours.

The bush breakfast is similar, with a sunrise drive to the location, a breakfast similar to a Full English, and a short drive back to camp.

=== Other activities ===
Other activities at Skukuza include:

- Kids Educational Programme (seasonal).
- Through prior arrangement with the camp, catered traditional dances can be arranged.
- Wildlife films every evening (except Sundays).

^aThe other camp that offers afternoon walks is Letaba.

== Nearby Attractions and Game Viewing ==
Skukuza is located in the southern part of Kruger and is the most popular and accessible camp, and one of the best for game viewing. In the vicinity of the camp all of the big five can be found, as well as other recognisable animals. The camp itself overlooks the Sabie River, and it's common to see elephants, hippos, crocodiles, and other large game visible from camp. The trees along the river are home to chacma baboons and vervet monkeys, and the calls of greater galagos are heard at dawn and dusk. Wahlberg's epauletted fruit bats can be seen under the verges of some thatched roofs. Some of these have been fitted with radio transmitters to study their feeding patterns and home ranges. The bats have also been studied to distinguish the mating calls of multiple species in the area.

=== Lake Panic Bird Hide ===
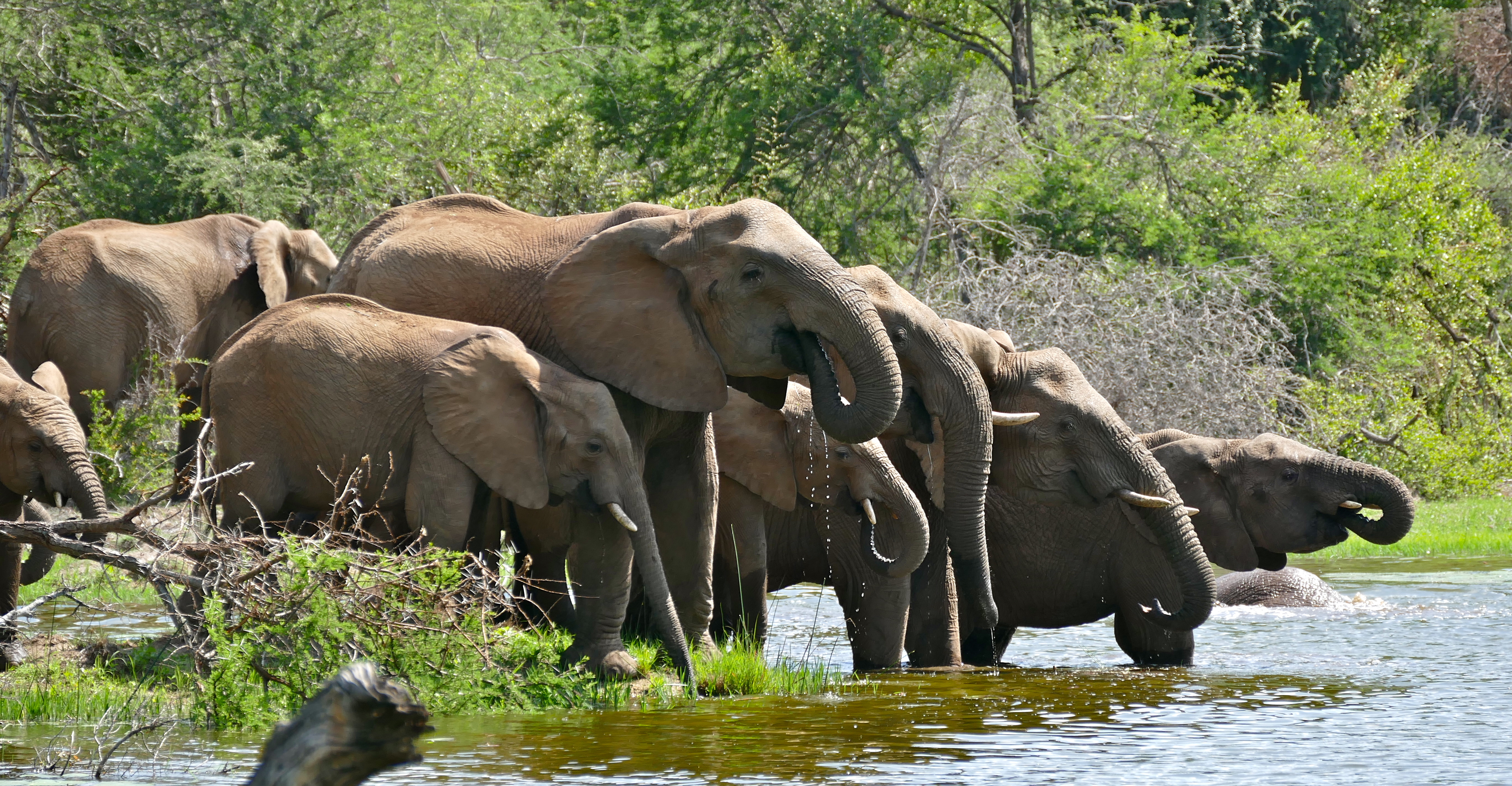
Elephants drinking at Lake Panic

Approximately 7 km (4.3 mi) from camp is the Lake Panic Bird Hide, probably the most famous bird hide in Kruger Park. It is located directly on the western end of Lake Panic, a manmade lake created by an earthen dam constructed in 1975 on Mafunyana Creek. The lake is home to quite a few hippos, crocodiles and terrapins, as well as a host of species of fish. Large mammals, including elephant, can frequently be spotted drinking at the shore of the lake. Birds are also quite common at Lake Panic, including pied kingfishers, giant heron and the occasional African fish eagle. Viewing at Lake Panic has been called "birding the easy way" due to the ease with which one can see dozens of species within a relatively short period of time. The L-shaped hide gives two fairly distinct views - one towards the main surface of the lake (which is not visible from the hide, as it is around a bend), and one towards a smaller, rounded area and the creek inlet. Hippos will frequent this smaller area.

In March 2018, a small panic ensued when tourists started to notice the low level of the lake. This was caused by maintenance for a faulty drain valve, which required that the lake be partially drained temporarily. After the maintenance, water was pumped back into the lake from the Sabie River.

==== Name ====
The name "Lake Panic" is thought to have been given shortly after the dam was built, as during a cloudburst it was feared the dam would collapse.

=== Picnic sites ===
There are several picnic sites near Skukuza where one may leave one's vehicle. These sites typically provide braais or skottels (gas fire devices with griddles as well as wok style attachments) and toilet facilities, but some also sell hot food from their kitchens.

==== Tshokwane Trading Post ====
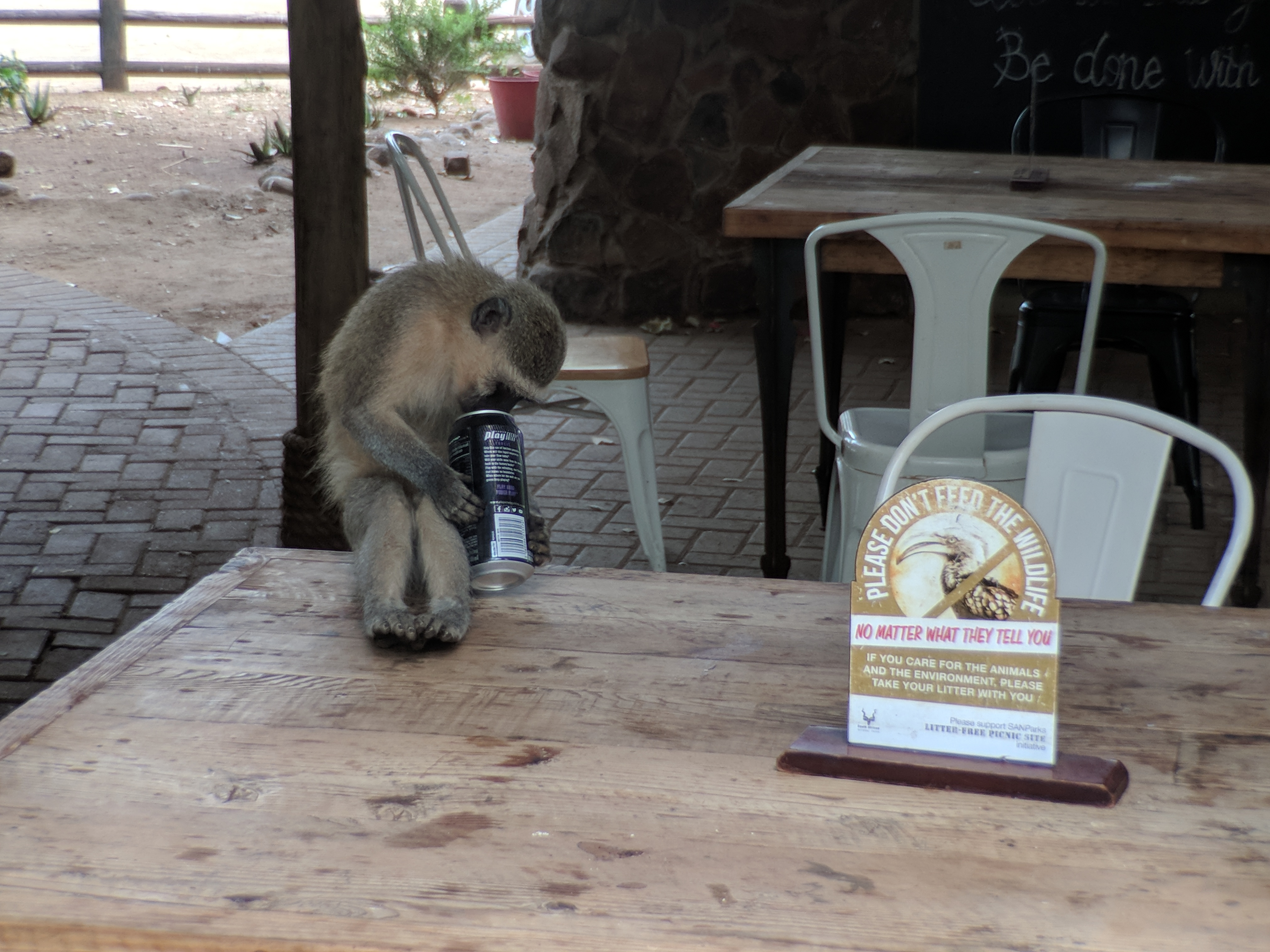
Vervet monkey drinking a stolen beverage at Tshokwane

Originally a ranger's post set up by James Stevenson-Hamilton in 1928, Tshokwane is now a picnic site with a shop and a restaurant. Its original purpose as a ranger's post was to give overnight shelter, as it was a day's ride on horseback from what is now Skukuza in one of the areas of the park most densely populated by big game and lions.

Tshokwane is privately operated by Tourvest and is roughly equidistant by road from Skukuza, Lower Sabie, and Satara. Gas braais are also available for hire, and raw foods for cooking are available at the shop. In 2016 it was announced that the kitchen at Tshokwane would be closed, but the shop still offered premade food as well as braais for rental. The restaurant area reopened after a renovation on 30 September 2019. Much of the seating is under a large sausage tree. Vervet monkeys frequent the site, stealing food and drinks from guests.

The name "Tshokwane", pronounced "chore-kwah-neh" with a non-rhotic "R", is a modern orthographical form of the name of a local Shangaan chief, Chokwane, who lived in the area around 1910.

==== Nkuhlu Picnic Site ====
The Nkuhlu picnic site is about halfway between Skukuza and Lower Sabie along the Sabie River Road (H4-1). Named after the Tsonga word for Natal mahogany which cover the site, the site offers snacks and refreshments for sale as well as the hire of skottels. The shop also sells curios and has a menu of cooked meals, including the site's speciality, waffles. The spot is quite popular, as it is the only picnic site along the busiest road in the park. Birds such as giant kingfisher and giant heron can be seen from the site. Crocodiles frequent the river below, and vervet monkeys sometimes terrorise patrons in order to steal their food.

=== Stevenson-Hamilton Memorial ===
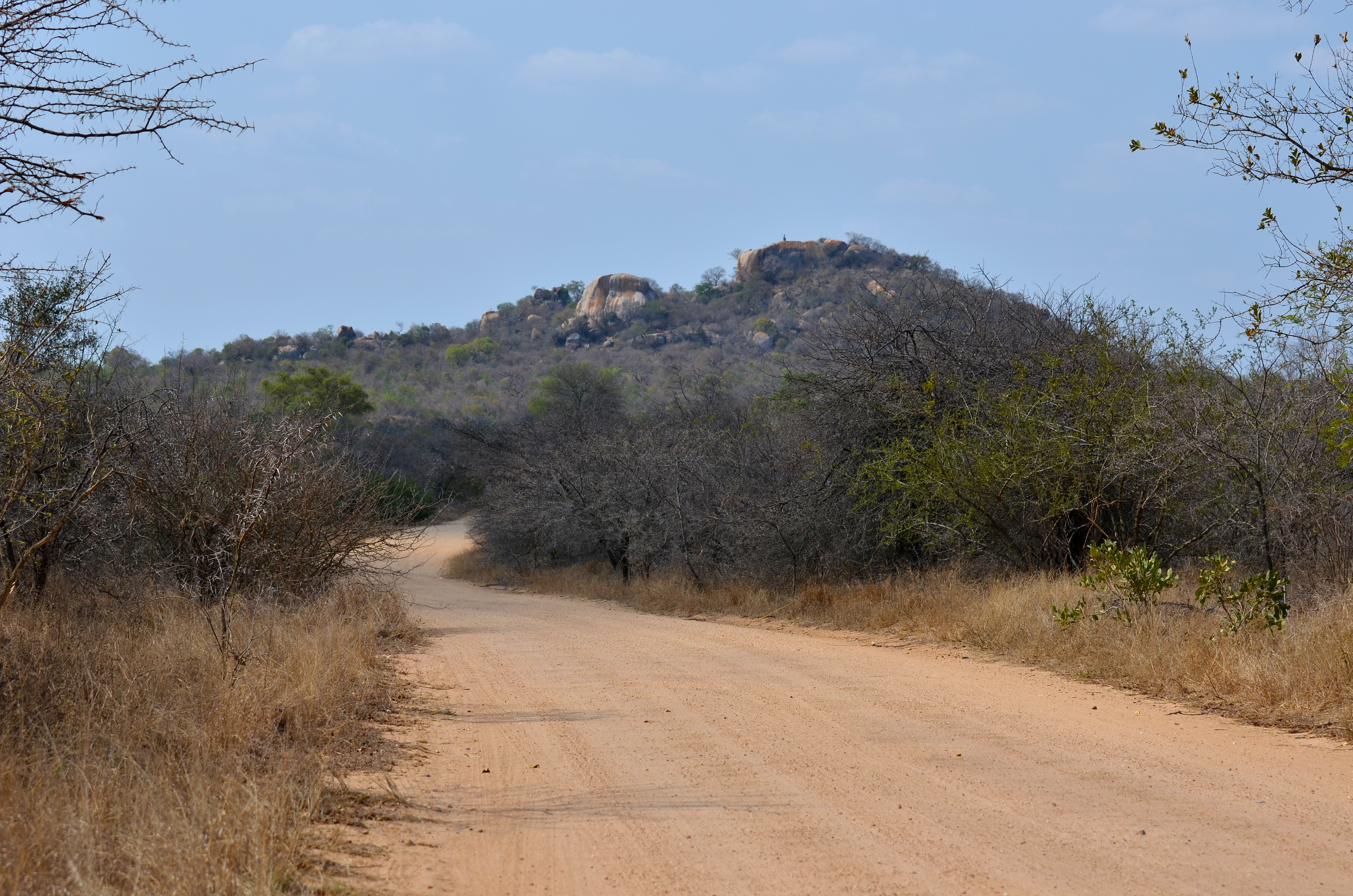
Stevenson Hamilton Memorial

13 km (8.1 mi) south of Skukuza in the Rhenosterkop region of the park is the Stevenson-Hamilton memorial, on a rock formation called Shrimantanga. The area is one of the few unstaffed areas where one is allowed to leave a vehicle (at one's own risk), but is in an area known for leopards. The area contains several granite rock formations as well as a path up to the top of one, which provides a view over the veld below. The memorial was erected in 1957, shortly after Stevenson-Hamilton's death.

== Accommodation ==
Accommodation at Skukuza varies from small, but comfortable, bungalows to large guesthouses suitable for tour groups. Each house has an outside braai (barbecue) area and mosquito protection. The large camping terrain has sites for caravans, motor homes, and tents; campers share the ablutions, cooking, and washing up facilities. All who stay at Skukuza are entitled to make use of the onsite facilities such as use of the swimming pools and participate in select events such as watching free movies at the outdoor cinema.

Unrelated but quite near to Skukuza is the Protea Hotel Kruger Gate, a 4-star lodge-style hotel located immediately outside of the park (19 km from Skukuza camp). The hotel is owned by Protea Hotels, a subsidiary of Marriott and has air conditioning as well as its own restaurant and bar, swimming pool, gym, tennis courts, children's playground, car rental and conference facilities.

=== Kruger Shalati hotel ===
Kruger Shalati is a luxury hotel based in train cars on the bridge and in the nearby station at Skukuza. It offers 24 two-sleeper carriage rooms and 7 two-sleeper bridge house suites, with floor to ceiling glass walls in the train cars for immersion into the surrounding area. The rooms are decorated in a reimagined style of the original 1920s trains that crossed the bridge. The hotel has an overhanging pool above the river, facing away from the rest of Skukuza.

=== Accommodation for Guests with Mobility Challenges ===
South African National Parks are working to provide facilities for guests with mobility challenges, including safari vehicles and sleeping accommodations. 6 of the bungalows (all coded BD2Z by SANParks) are equipped with roll-in showers, and 2 (coded BG2ZE) have baths with hand rails. Units with baths, however, lack kitchenettes. One guest cottage (unit 226) is also equipped with a wheelchair-accessible bathroom and a roll-in shower. These facilities have been noted as being difficult to use without assistance.

== Village ==
As the administrative headquarters of Kruger Park, Skukuza has a somewhat substantial number of people living in the area. Living quarters for employees at camps in Kruger National Park are confined to staff villages, of which Skukuza is by far the largest. Only employees of the park or their family are allowed to live in the staff village, limiting the population. Due to the remote nature of Skukuza, residents generally make frequent trips to Nelspruit or Hazyview for shopping. The staff village also hosts the Skukuza Science Leadership Initiative, a research station owned by the Organization for Tropical Studies. This research station has a variety of projects studying ecology and biodiversity.

=== Laerskool Skukuza ===
Skukuza has a single primary school, Laerskool Skukuza, which provides multilingual education to approximately 200 children in the staff village. The school also acts as a boarding school for students of staff members at other camps. In 2007, an unused staff house was turned into a hostel for 26 students and a live-in matron. A nearby nursery school, founded as a non-profit, acts as a feeder school to Laerskool Skukuza.

=== Religious Services ===
Skukuza contains a single Dutch Reformed Church, NG Kerk Krugerwildtuin. This is claimed to be the world's only parsonage in a game reserve. The church has a history dating back to 1969, when a church for the Skukuza staff village was first proposed. A cornerstone was laid in 1972, and the church finally opened on 27 April 1986. The church primarily hosts NG Kerk services in Afrikaans, but services have also been held in English.

=== N'waswitshaka Research Camp ===
Near the staff village is the N'waswitshaka research camp, which provides accommodation for visiting researchers and their guests. The facilities are similar to the rondavels, chalets and campsites in the main camp, but are entirely self-serve. Additional resources such as an office facility with internet access and game guards are available for researchers if necessary.

=== Wildlife Incidents ===
The village at Skukuza is not fenced in like the rest camp is, and there have been multiple incidents of people in the staff village being killed by wildlife, especially leopards. There is a fairly dense population of big cats near Skukuza, which is part of the draw for tourists but also makes the area more dangerous.

== Climate ==
Skukuza has a hot semi-arid climate with a summer rainy season (Köppen climate classification type BSh) typical of much of the Lowveld.

Climate data for Skukuza, elevation 271 m (889 ft), (1991–2020 normals, extremes 1960–2023)
Month	Jan	Feb	Mar	Apr	May	Jun	Jul	Aug	Sep	Oct	Nov	Dec	Year
Record high °C (°F)	44.7 (112.5)	45.6 (114.1)	43.6 (110.5)	41.3 (106.3)	39.2 (102.6)	36.4 (97.5)	36.4 (97.5)	37.6 (99.7)	42.6 (108.7)	45.9 (114.6)	43.3 (109.9)	46.3 (115.3)	46.3 (115.3)
Mean daily maximum °C (°F)	33.2 (91.8)	33.1 (91.6)	32.9 (91.2)	30.8 (87.4)	28.4 (83.1)	26.9 (80.4)	26.5 (79.7)	28.3 (82.9)	30.8 (87.4)	31.6 (88.9)	32.8 (91.0)	33.7 (92.7)	30.8 (87.3)
Daily mean °C (°F)	26.8 (80.2)	26.9 (80.4)	26.1 (79.0)	23.3 (73.9)	19.6 (67.3)	16.7 (62.1)	16.4 (61.5)	18.6 (65.5)	22.2 (72.0)	24.1 (75.4)	25.7 (78.3)	26.8 (80.2)	22.8 (73.0)
Mean daily minimum °C (°F)	20.3 (68.5)	20.8 (69.4)	19.3 (66.7)	15.7 (60.3)	10.4 (50.7)	5.8 (42.4)	6.4 (43.5)	8.5 (47.3)	13.6 (56.5)	16.6 (61.9)	18.6 (65.5)	19.9 (67.8)	14.7 (58.4)
Record low °C (°F)	10.1 (50.2)	10.0 (50.0)	7.6 (45.7)	4.9 (40.8)	−0.1 (31.8)	−4.5 (23.9)	−3.8 (25.2)	−4.2 (24.4)	1.3 (34.3)	4.8 (40.6)	9.6 (49.3)	9.5 (49.1)	−4.5 (23.9)
Average precipitation mm (inches)	110.9 (4.37)	109.4 (4.31)	79.9 (3.15)	39.8 (1.57)	15.6 (0.61)	9.5 (0.37)	11.4 (0.45)	8.7 (0.34)	27.9 (1.10)	40.0 (1.57)	85.7 (3.37)	96.3 (3.79)	635.1 (25)
Average precipitation days (≥ 0.25 mm)	1.2	1.3	0.9	0.3	0.1	0.1	0.1	0.1	0.3	0.3	0.8	1.2	6.7
Source: Starlings Roost Weather (precipitation 1911–2023)

== Gallery ==
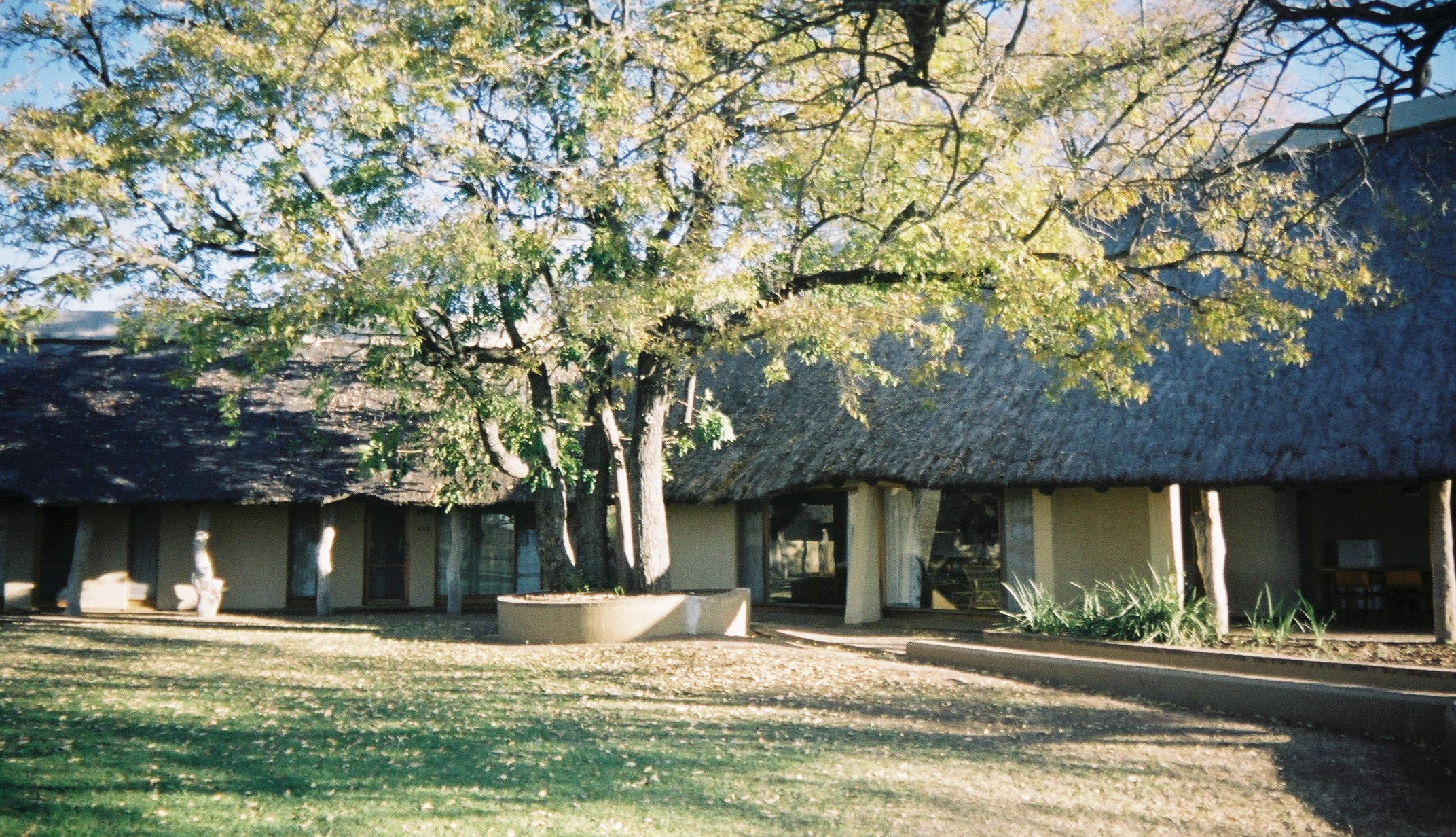
Part of the Waterkant guesthouse

A group of lionesses on an early evening prowl on the H1-2 road just east of Skukuza

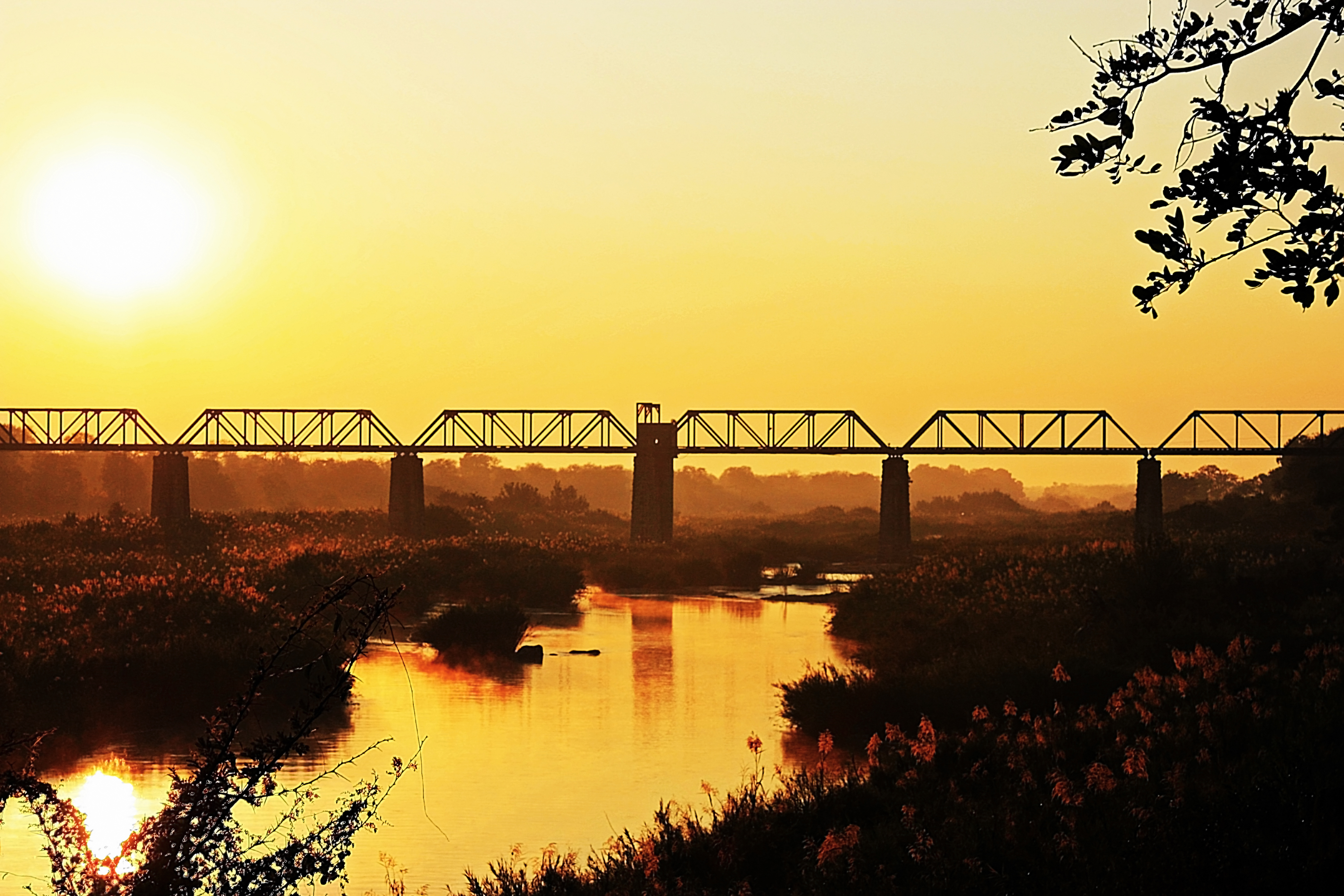
Selati train bridge over the Sabie River

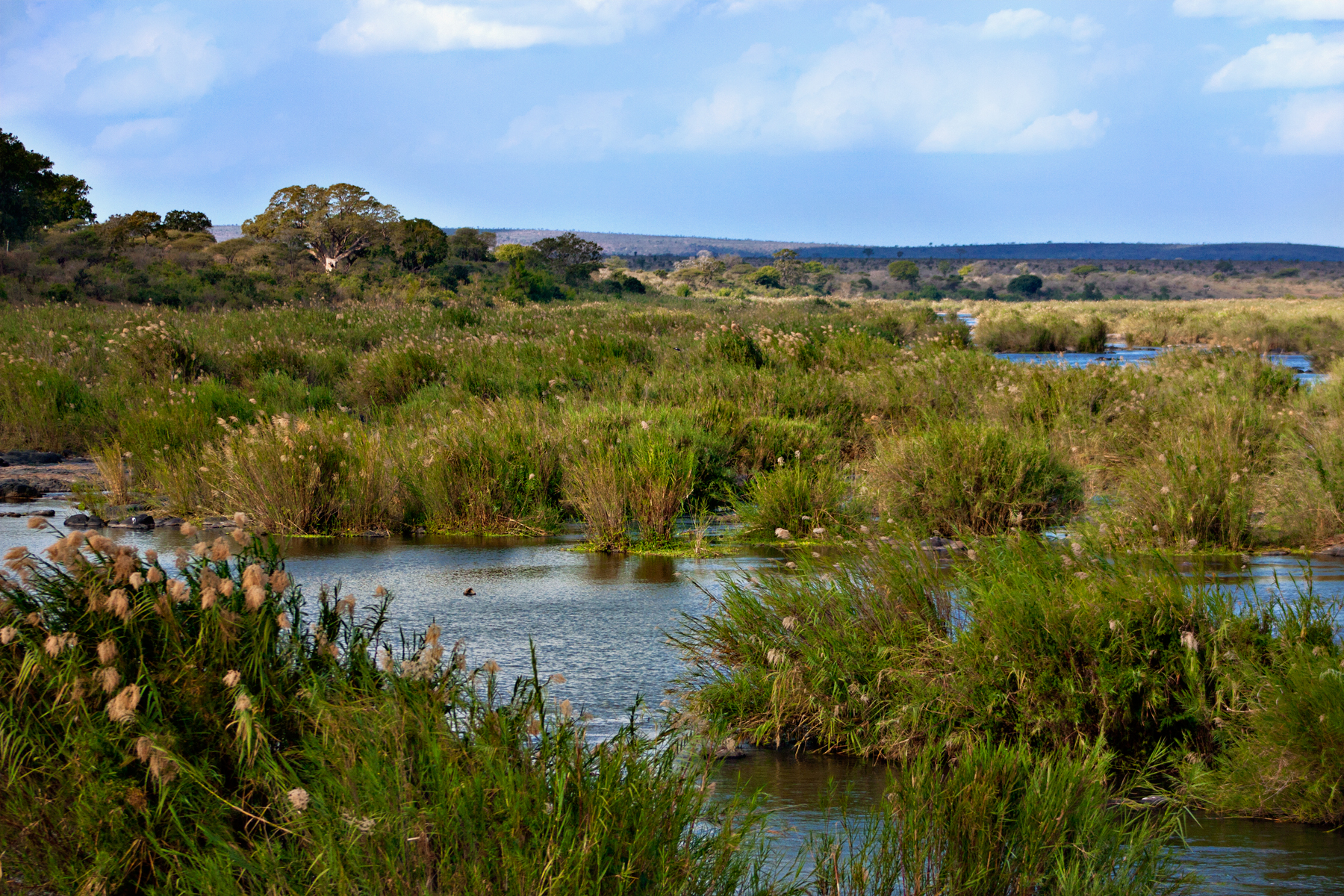
Sabie River near Skukuza

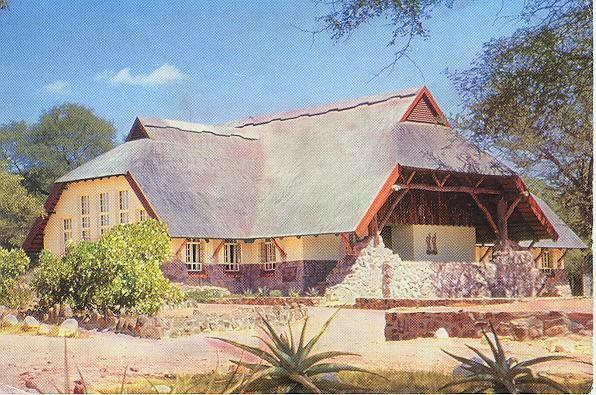
The Stevenson-Hamilton library in Skukuza

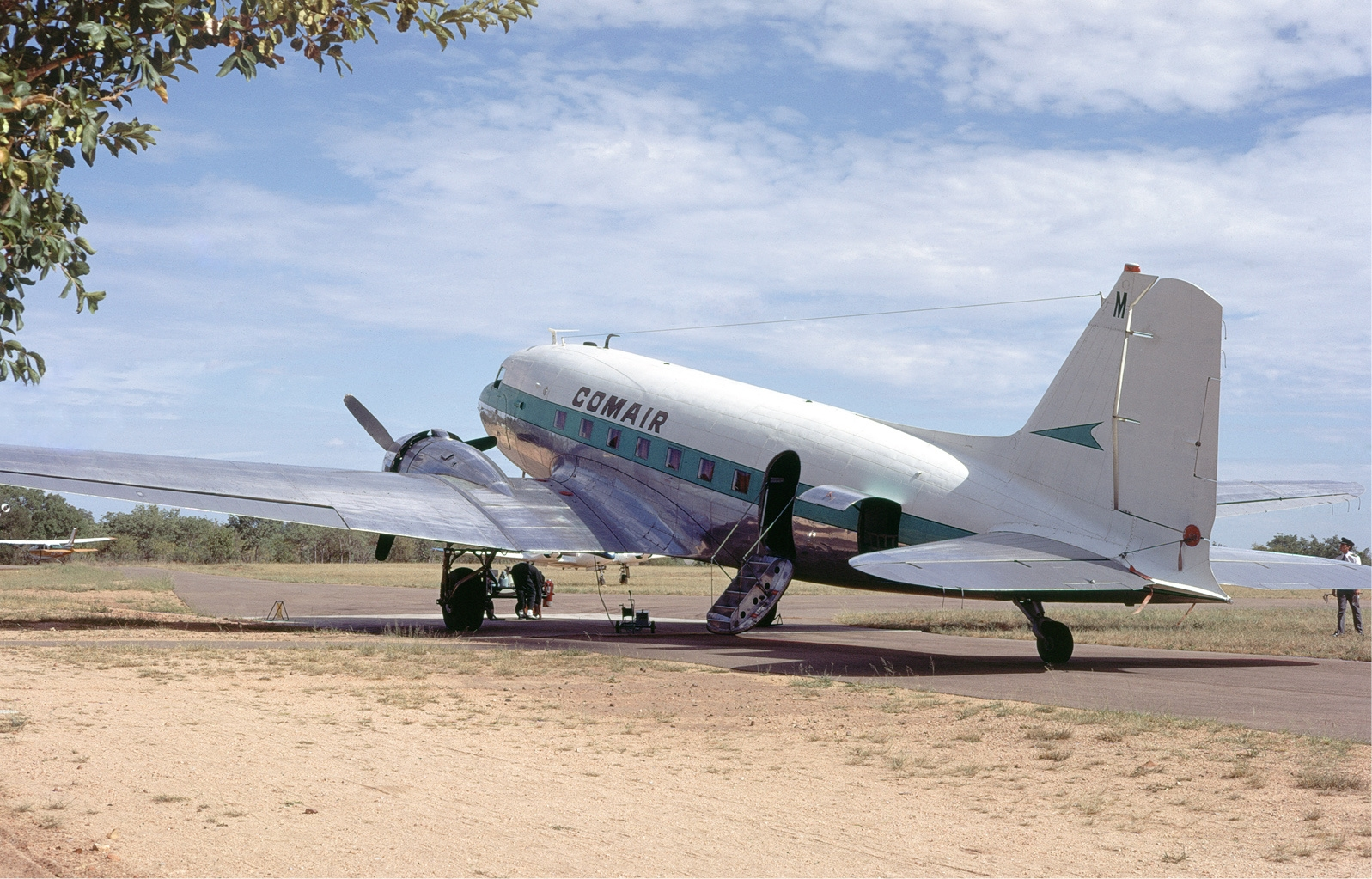
A Comair Douglas DC-3 at Skukuza in 1973
