= Sabie River =

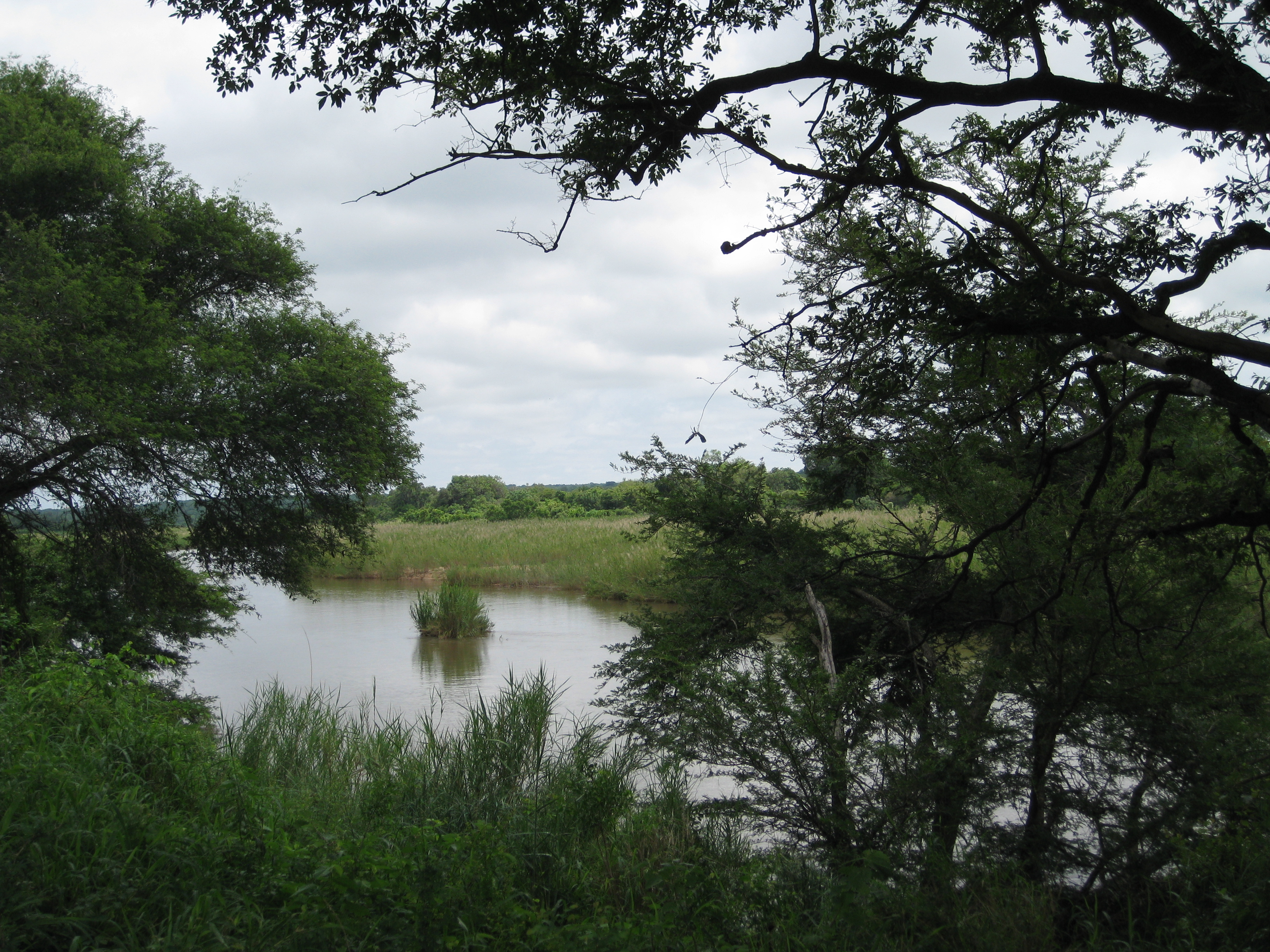
- Sabie River east of Skukuza
- Etymology: From the word for 'sand' in the Tsonga language

Location
- Country: South Africa, Mozambique
- Province: Mpumalanga, Maputo Province

Physical characteristics
- Source
  - location: Mount Anderson, Lydenburg, South Africa
  - elevation: 1,100 m (3,600 ft)
- Mouth: Komati River
  - location: Maputo Province
  - coordinates: 25°19′52″S 32°17′50″E
- Discharge
  - average: 0 m^{3}/s (0 cu ft/s)

Basin features
- River system: Komati River
- Tributaries
  - left: Sand River
  - right: Mac Mac; Marite River

The Sabie River is a river in South Africa that forms part of the Komati River System. The catchment area of the Sabie-Sand system is 6,320 km^{2} in extent. The Sabie is one of the most biologically diverse rivers in South Africa, with generally good water quality.

== Course ==
It rises in the Drakensberg escarpment of Mpumalanga province, flowing eastwards into the lowveld. It crosses the breadth of the Kruger National Park before cutting through the Lebombo range into Mozambique. Some 40 km from Moamba it enters the large Corumana Dam before finally joining the Komati. Settlements on its banks include Sabie, Hazyview, Skukuza and Lower Sabie.

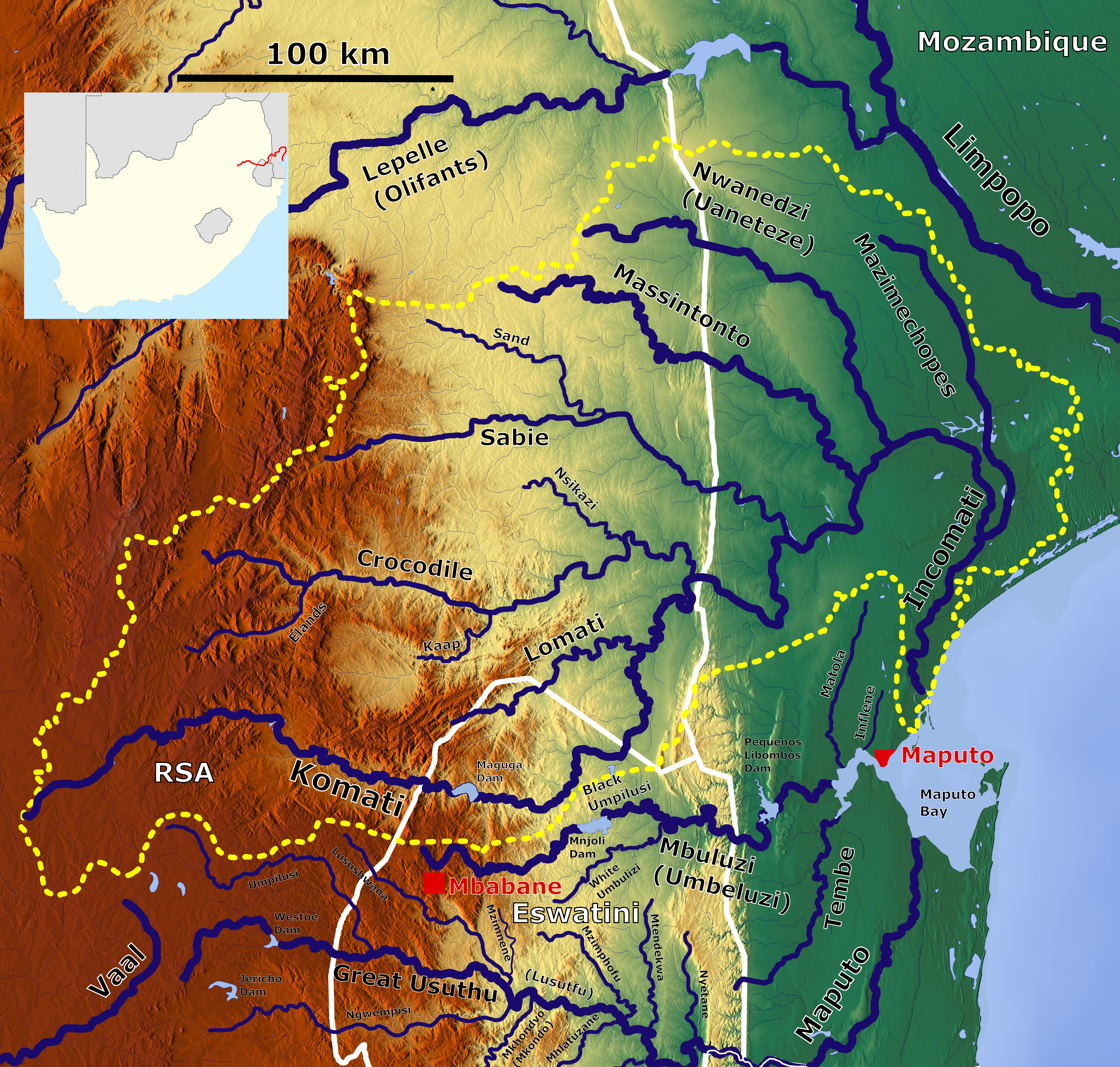
The Sabie River in the Komati catchment (centre)

== Tributaries ==
Tributaries of the Sabie include:

- Klein Sabie River
- Mac Mac River
- Marite River, its tributary is:
  - Ngwaritsana River
- Motitse River
- Mhlambanyatsi River (in Kruger Park)
- N'waswitshaka River (at Skukuza)
- N'watindlopfu Spruit (in Kruger Park)
- N'watinwambu River (in Kruger Park)
- Sabane River
- Sand River (in Kruger Park)
