= Kruger National Park =

First national park in South Africa

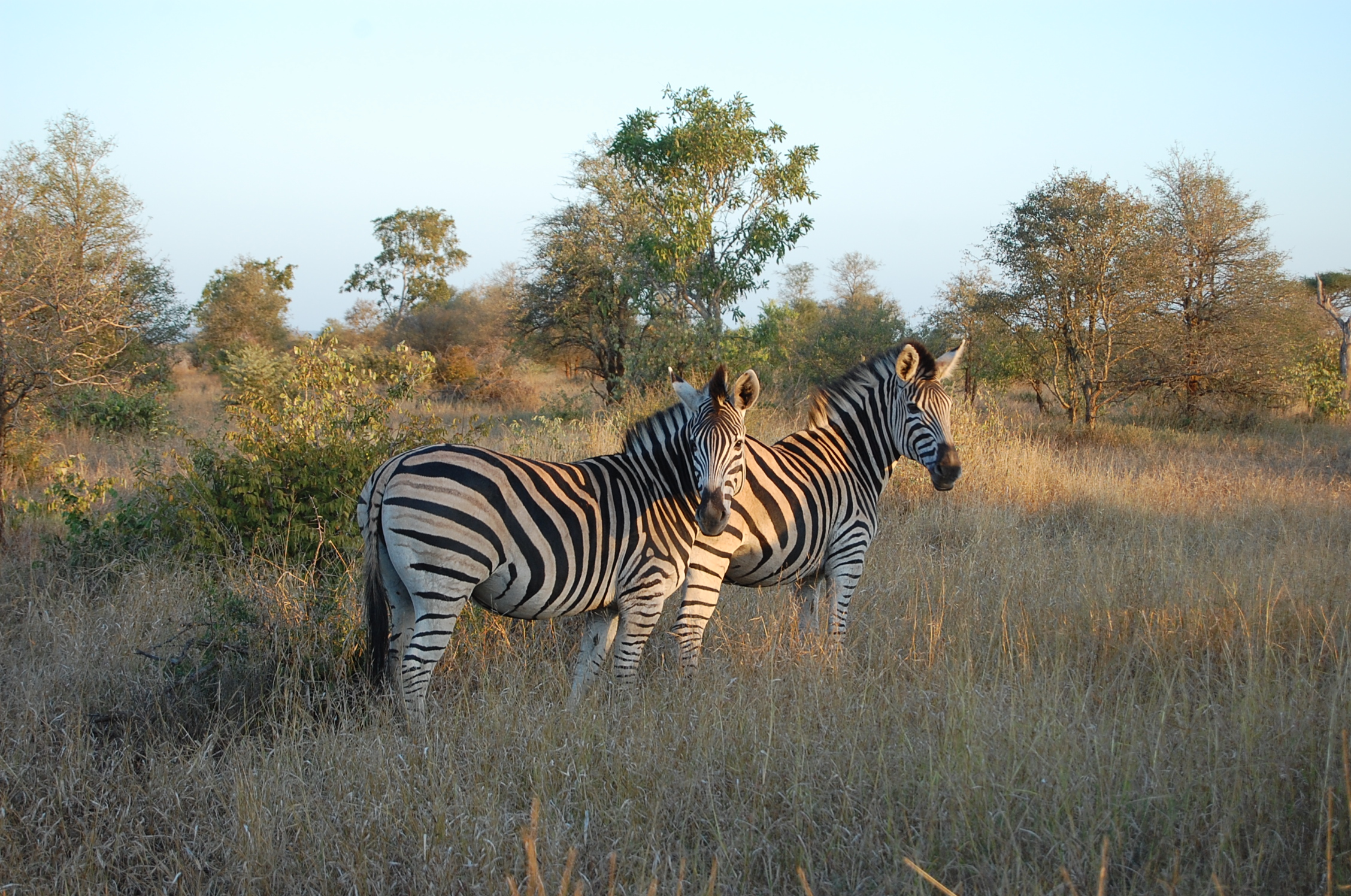
- Plains zebras in a Kruger landscape

- Location of the park (red area) in South Africa
- Location: Limpopo and Mpumalanga provinces, South Africa
- Nearest city: Mbombela (southern); Phalaborwa (central)
- Coordinates: 24.0°S 31.5°E
- Area: 19,623 km^{2} (7,576 sq mi)
- Established: 31 May 1926
- Visitors: 1,659,793 (1,277,397 day visitors, 382,396 overnight) (in 2014–15 FY)
- Governing body: South African National Parks
- Website: www.sanparks.org/parks/kruger

Kruger National Park (Afrikaans: [ˈkry.(j)ər]) is a national park in South Africa covering an area of 19,623 km^{2} (7,576 sq mi) in the provinces of Limpopo and Mpumalanga in the country's northeast. It extends 360 km (220 mi) from north to south and 65 km (40 mi) from east to west. The administrative headquarters are in Skukuza. Areas of the park were first protected by the government of the South African Republic in 1898, and it became South Africa's first national park in 1926. It is part of Kruger to Canyons Biosphere, an area designated as a biosphere reserve. It is within the South Africa Standard Time Zone (GMT+2).

The founder of Kruger National Park is considered to be President Paul Kruger. It is a major tourist attraction which in 2024 drew close to 2 million visitors.

== History ==
=== Conservation Pre-Game Reserve (1867–1898) ===
A Game Commission was established in 1891 with J.M. Malan of Rustenburg as chairman, which resulted in the establishment of the game law of 1891. As early as 1867 individual farmers in the South African Republic started publishing notices in the Staatscourant which prohibited hunting as a measure to preserve game on their private land. In this manner a total 200 owners protected game on some 300 farms between 1867 and 1881.

One of these farmers was pioneer Alexander Marsh Robertson who owned two adjacent farms, Rolfontein and Elandsberg, extending over 7600 morgen (6,510.92 ha (65.1092 km^{2})) in the Wakkerstroom district. Robertson was the first farmer to fence part of his property to create a game camp in the eastern Transvaal, some 500 morgen (428.35 ha (4.2835 km^{2})) using leadwood and barbed wire. The creation of the game camp however was serendipity. Robertson initially erected the fence to restrain his horses, but the fence also provided the added benefit of protecting the ground game. Game in this camp increased significantly due to the protection offered by the fence.

President Paul Kruger regularly toured the rural areas to visit his people. He heard about the success of Robertson's "game camp" and wrote to Albertus Stoop, his son Tjaart's future father-in-law, himself a keen conservationist and neighbour of Robertson, to arrange a visit to Rolfontein so that he could see the experiment first hand and stay the night. Kruger was very impressed with Robertson's unexpected success and continued to show great interest in the Wakkerstroom farmer's efforts to preserve game over the next few years. He visited Rolfontein again in 1892, and it was at this visit, at a great braai held in his honour that he spoke to the importance of Rolfontein in protecting smaller game and proceeded to lay out, for the first time in a public forum, his plan to establish the first Game Reserve in Africa along the Sabi River to preserve the big game that needed a much larger protected habitat to thrive.

=== Sabi Game Reserve (1898–1926) ===
Sabi Game Reserve was initially created to control hunting and to protect the diminishing number of animals in the area. The reserve was located in the southern one-third of the modern park. James Stevenson-Hamilton became the first warden of the reserve in 1902. Singwitsi Reserve, named after the Shingwedzi River and now in northern Kruger National Park, was proclaimed in 1903. During the following decades all the native tribes were removed from the reserve and during the 1960s the last were removed at Makuleke in the Pafuri triangle.

In 1918 a commission was established to review the Sabi Reserve. The first secretary of the commission was J. A. de Ridder, a civil servant. Counterintuitively, the commission actually recommended reducing the size of the park in order to allow greater commercial exploitation of the land.

In 1923, the Minister for Lands, Deneys Reitz, led a survey expedition around the reserve and devised a scheme whereby the government would exchange state land outside the reserve with that of the local private landowners in order to establish a true national park. During the same year, the first large groups of tourists started visiting the Sabi Game Reserve, but only as part of the South African Railways' popular "Round in Nine" tours. The tourist trains travelled the Selati railway line between Komatipoort on the Mozambican border and Tzaneen in the then northern Transvaal.

Following a change of government in 1924, Reitz's scheme was implemented by the new Lands Minister, Piet Grobler. In May 1926, Grobler introduced a National Parks Bill to parliament, which passed on 11 June 1926, finally establishing the modern Kruger National Park.

The name Kruger was officially proposed by Judge J.A.J de Villiers at a meeting of the National Monuments Commission and especially appealed to Grobler himself as a great-grandnephew of Paul Kruger. Behind the scenes it had been championed by English-speaking naturalists in order to win Afrikaner support for the Park.

=== Kruger National Park ===
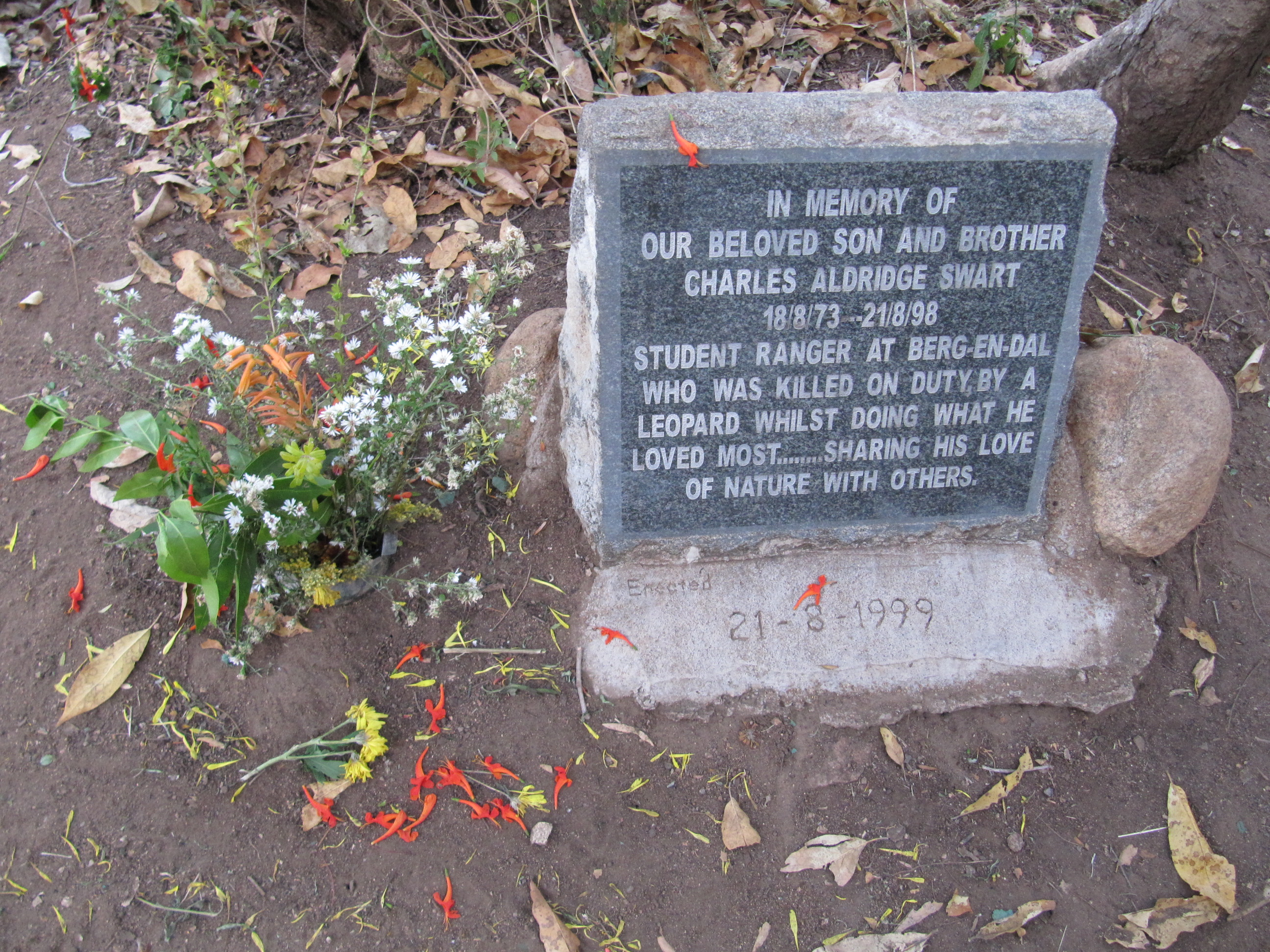
Plaque in the park.

By the passage of the National Parks Act of 1926, Sabi Game Reserve, the adjacent Singwitsi Game Reserve, and farms were combined to create Kruger National Park. In line with the scheme developed by Reitz, private landowners in total exchanged a total of 76,000 km^{2} (29,000 sq mi) of land in the reserve for 550 km^{2} (210 sq mi) of government land on the outside, as well financial restitution, which totalled £40,000.

The previous Sabi Reserve Warden, James Stevenson-Hamilton, became Warden of the new park. A Board of Trustees was appointed to run the park, chaired by Senator W. J. C. Brebner (chairman), and including a range of politicians, naturalists and philanthropists: Deneys Reitz, Oswald Pirow, H. B. Papenfus, R. A. Hockly, Sir Abe Bailey, W. A. Campbell, Alwin Karl Haagner, Gustav Preller, and A. E. Charter, who served as secretary.

In 1928 the head of the South African Air Force, Sir Pierre van Ryneveld, personally led an airborne expedition by three Board of Trustees members to investigate the effect of low-flying airplanes on game. The Board members included Deneys Reitz, who used the data from this trip to frame regulations on flying over the Park.

Warden James Stevenson-Hamilton retired on 30 April 1946, after 44 years of service. He was replaced by Colonel J. A. B. Sandenbergh of the South African Air Force. In 1959, work commenced to completely fence the park's boundaries. Work started on the southern boundary along the Crocodile River and in 1960 the western and northern boundaries were fenced, followed by the eastern boundary with Mozambique. The purpose of the fence was to curb the spread of diseases, facilitate border patrolling and inhibit the movement of poachers.

The Makuleke area in the northern part of the park was forcibly taken from the Makuleke people by the government in 1969 and about 1500 of them were relocated to land to the south so that their original tribal areas could be integrated into the greater Kruger National Park.

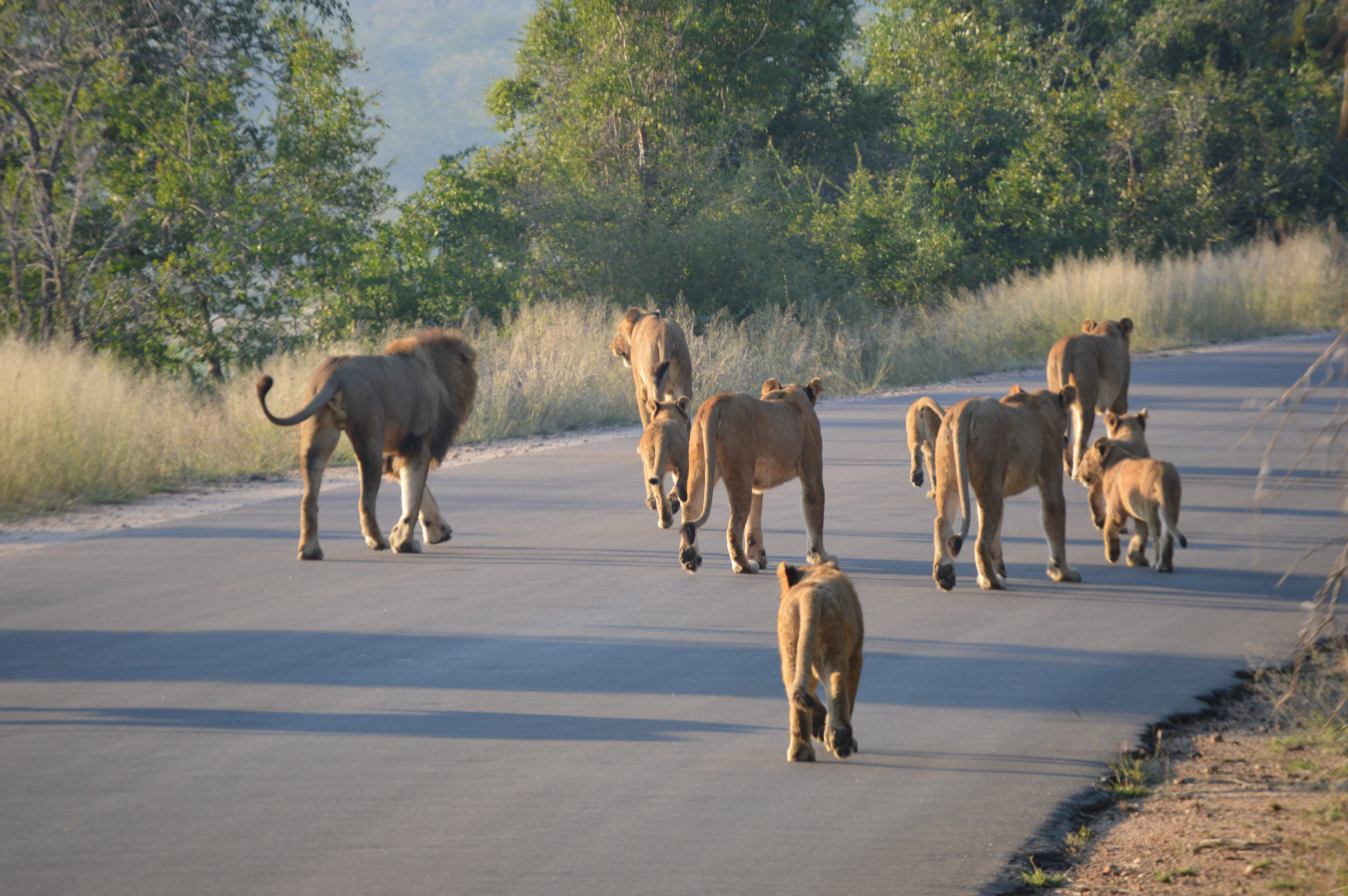
Pride of lions on a tourist road

In 1996, the Makuleke tribe submitted a land claim for 198.42 km^{2} (76.61 sq mi), namely the Pafuri or Makuleke region in the northernmost part of the park. The land was given back to the Makuleke people, however, they chose not to resettle on the land but to engage with the private sector to invest in tourism. This resulted in the building of several game lodges from which they earn royalties.

In the late 1990s, the fences between the Kruger Park and Klaserie Game Reserve, Olifants Game Reserve, and Balule Nature Reserve were dropped and incorporated into the Greater Kruger Park with 4,000 km^{2} (1,500 sq mi) added to the Reserve. In 2002, Kruger National Park, Gonarezhou National Park in Zimbabwe, and Limpopo National Park in Mozambique were incorporated into a peace park, the Great Limpopo Transfrontier Park.

== Location and geography ==
Geography of the park

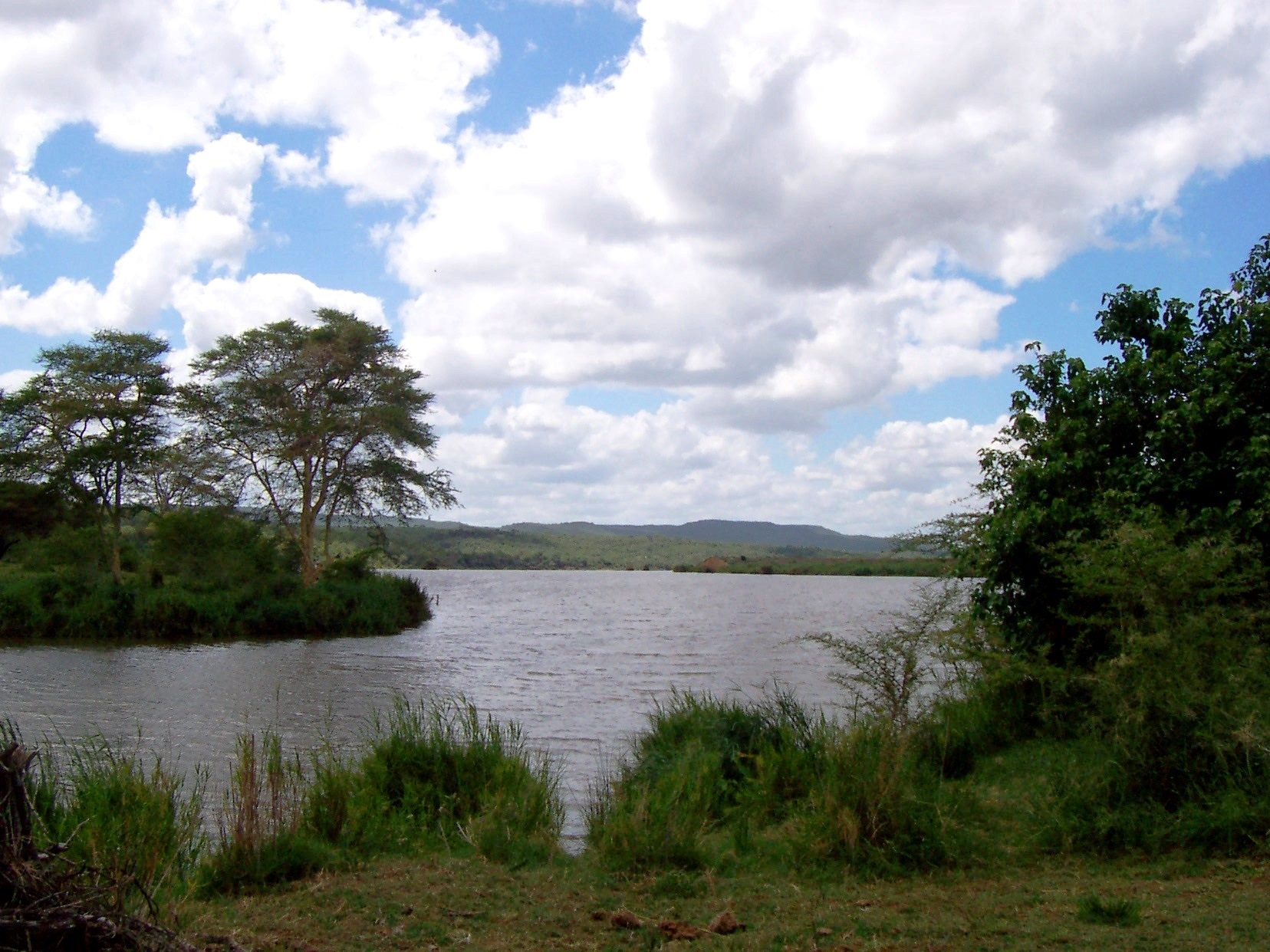
Luvubu-Limpopo confluence at Crook's Corner

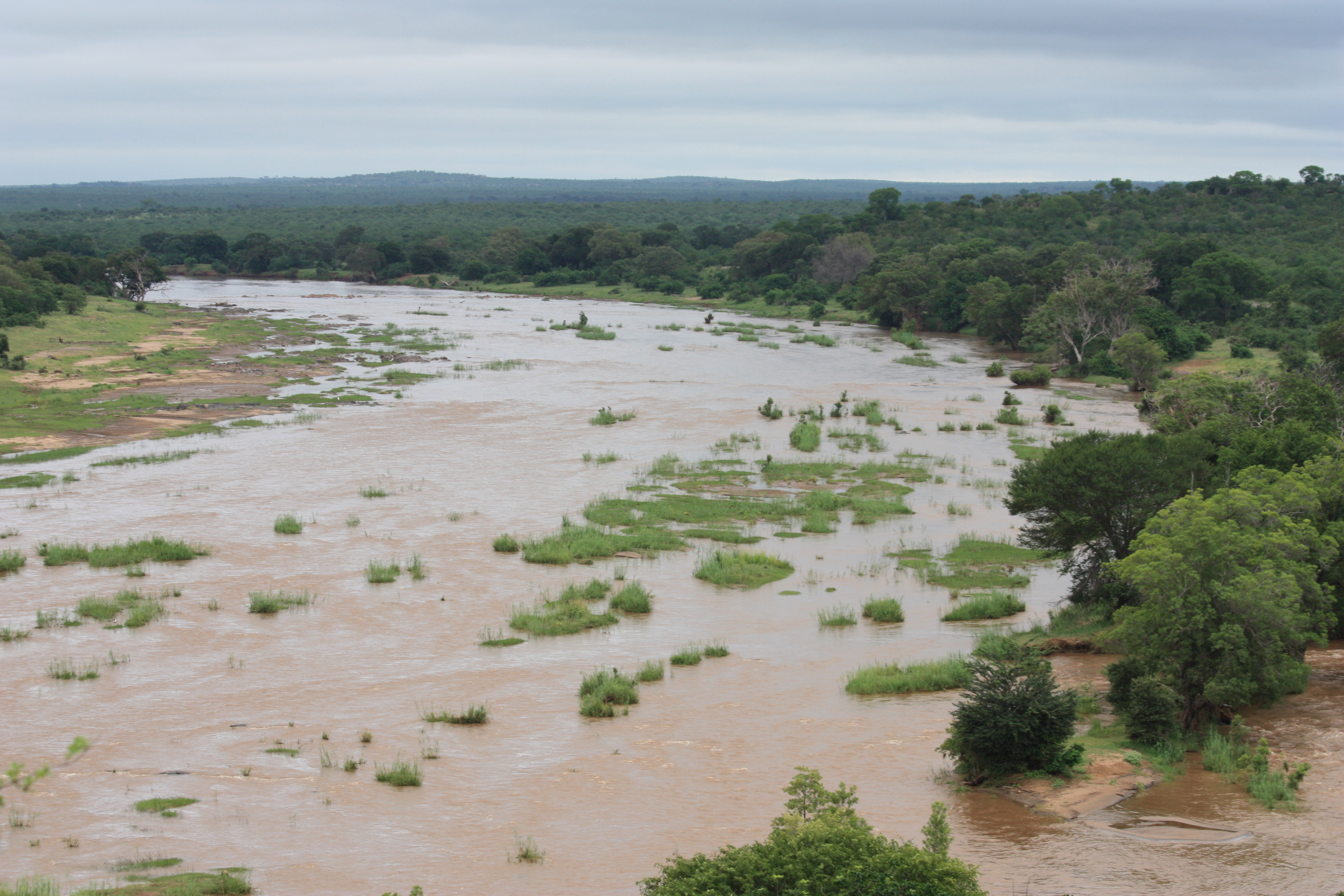
Olifants River in flood

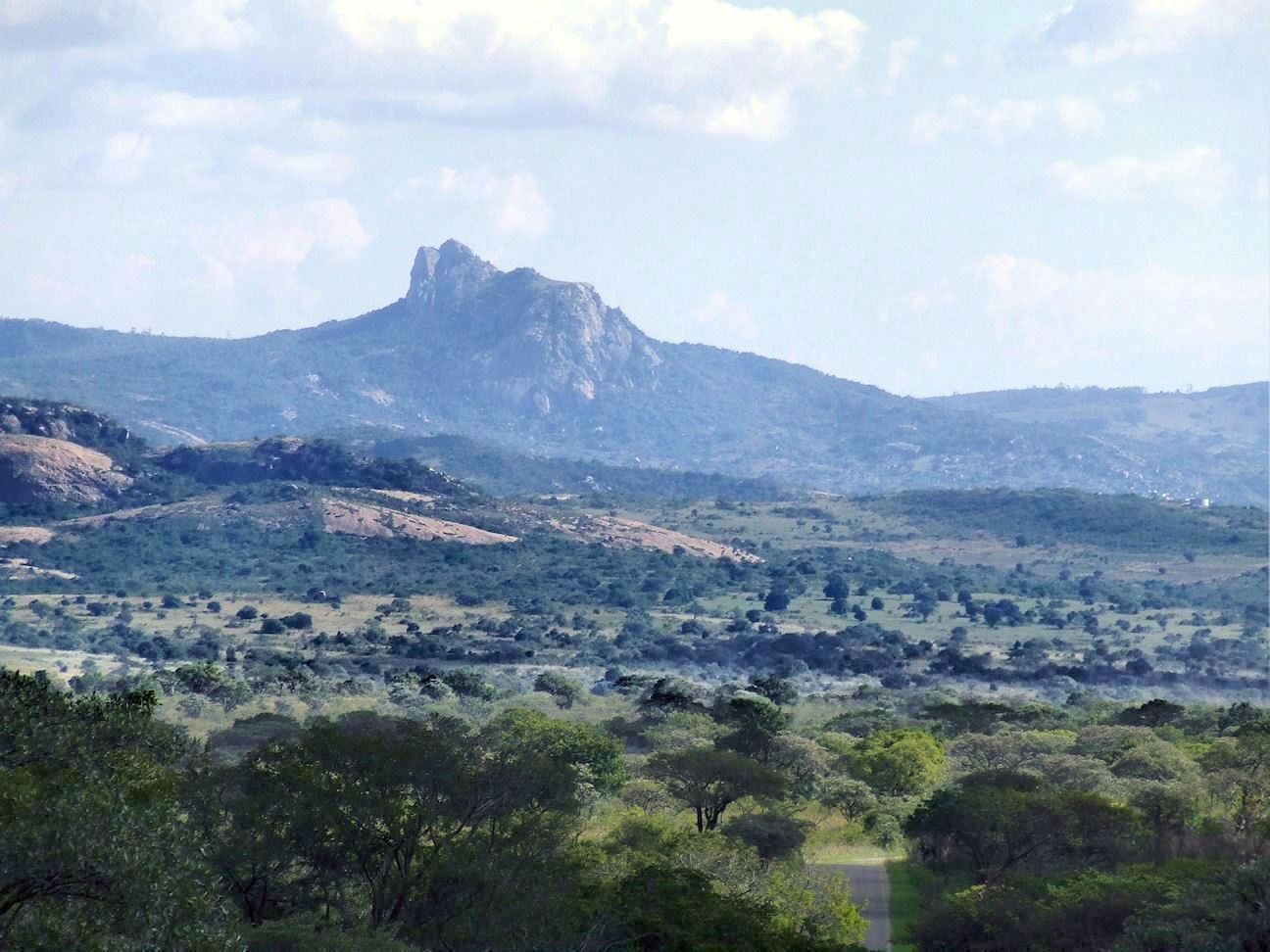
Granite inselbergs in the south

The park lies in the northeast of South Africa, in the eastern or lowveld region of Limpopo and Mpumalanga provinces. Three South African towns, namely Phalaborwa, Malelane and Komatipoort border the park, and due to their proximity to entry gates, often accommodate day visitors. In addition various lodges and conservation villages such as Shawu's Hills, Marloth Park, Mjejane, Ngwenya, Leopard Creek, Leopard Sands and Elephant Point also overlook the southern portion of the park.

It is one of the largest national parks in the world, with an area of 19,485 km^{2} (7,523 sq mi). The park is approximately 360 km (220 mi) long, and has an average width of 65 km (40 mi). At its widest point, the park is 90 km (56 mi) wide from east to west.

To the north and south of the park, four eastward flowing rivers, the Limpopo, Luvubu, Sabie and Crocodile Rivers respectively, act as natural boundaries. Additionally the Olifants and Letaba Rivers traverse the park from west to east. The Olifants, besides forming the provincial boundary, essentially bisects the park and presents a distinct dividing line between two major ecological and vegetation zones. To the east, the Lebombo Mountains separate it from Mozambique. Some 65 km (40 mi) distant, the western boundary runs broadly parallel with this range. The park varies in altitude between 200 m (660 ft) in the east and 840 m (2,760 ft) in the south-west near Berg-en-Dal, where a granite inselberg, Khandzalive, forms the highest point in the park.

Climate data for Skukuza, elevation 271 m (889 ft), (1991–2020 normals, extremes 1960–2023)
Month	Jan	Feb	Mar	Apr	May	Jun	Jul	Aug	Sep	Oct	Nov	Dec	Year
Record high °C (°F)	44.7 (112.5)	45.6 (114.1)	43.6 (110.5)	41.3 (106.3)	39.2 (102.6)	36.4 (97.5)	36.4 (97.5)	37.6 (99.7)	42.6 (108.7)	45.9 (114.6)	43.3 (109.9)	46.3 (115.3)	46.3 (115.3)
Mean daily maximum °C (°F)	33.2 (91.8)	33.1 (91.6)	32.9 (91.2)	30.8 (87.4)	28.4 (83.1)	26.9 (80.4)	26.5 (79.7)	28.3 (82.9)	30.8 (87.4)	31.6 (88.9)	32.8 (91.0)	33.7 (92.7)	30.8 (87.3)
Daily mean °C (°F)	26.8 (80.2)	26.9 (80.4)	26.1 (79.0)	23.3 (73.9)	19.6 (67.3)	16.7 (62.1)	16.4 (61.5)	18.6 (65.5)	22.2 (72.0)	24.1 (75.4)	25.7 (78.3)	26.8 (80.2)	22.8 (73.0)
Mean daily minimum °C (°F)	20.3 (68.5)	20.8 (69.4)	19.3 (66.7)	15.7 (60.3)	10.4 (50.7)	5.8 (42.4)	6.4 (43.5)	8.5 (47.3)	13.6 (56.5)	16.6 (61.9)	18.6 (65.5)	19.9 (67.8)	14.7 (58.4)
Record low °C (°F)	10.1 (50.2)	10.0 (50.0)	7.6 (45.7)	4.9 (40.8)	−0.1 (31.8)	−4.5 (23.9)	−3.8 (25.2)	−4.2 (24.4)	1.3 (34.3)	4.8 (40.6)	9.6 (49.3)	9.5 (49.1)	−4.5 (23.9)
Average precipitation mm (inches)	110.9 (4.37)	109.4 (4.31)	79.9 (3.15)	39.8 (1.57)	15.6 (0.61)	9.5 (0.37)	11.4 (0.45)	8.7 (0.34)	27.9 (1.10)	40.0 (1.57)	85.7 (3.37)	96.3 (3.79)	635.1 (25)
Average precipitation days (≥ 0.25 mm)	1.2	1.3	0.9	0.3	0.1	0.1	0.1	0.1	0.3	0.3	0.8	1.2	6.7
Source: Starlings Roost Weather (precipitation 1911–2023)

Climate data for Phalaborwa
Month	Jan	Feb	Mar	Apr	May	Jun	Jul	Aug	Sep	Oct	Nov	Dec	Year
Mean daily maximum °C (°F)	34 (93)	33 (91)	32 (90)	30 (86)	29 (84)	27 (81)	26 (79)	28 (82)	31 (88)	32 (90)	32 (90)	33 (91)	33 (91)
Daily mean °C (°F)	26.5 (79.7)	26 (79)	25 (77)	23 (73)	20 (68)	18 (64)	17.5 (63.5)	19 (66)	22 (72)	23 (73)	24 (75)	26 (79)	22 (72)
Mean daily minimum °C (°F)	21 (70)	21 (70)	20 (68)	17 (63)	12 (54)	10 (50)	9 (48)	11 (52)	14 (57)	17 (63)	19 (66)	21 (70)	16 (61)
Average precipitation mm (inches)	97 (3.8)	81 (3.2)	65 (2.6)	25 (1.0)	12 (0.5)	4 (0.2)	7.5 (0.30)	7 (0.3)	21 (0.8)	46 (1.8)	69 (2.7)	96 (3.8)	529 (20.8)

Climate data for Pafuri Rest camp, Kruger National Park
Month	Jan	Feb	Mar	Apr	May	Jun	Jul	Aug	Sep	Oct	Nov	Dec	Year
Mean daily maximum °C (°F)	35 (95)	34 (93)	33.6 (92.5)	32.7 (90.9)	29.9 (85.8)	27.7 (81.9)	28 (82)	29.9 (85.8)	32.1 (89.8)	34.7 (94.5)	34.1 (93.4)	35.1 (95.2)	32.2 (90.0)
Daily mean °C (°F)	28.2 (82.8)	28 (82)	26.9 (80.4)	25.4 (77.7)	21.7 (71.1)	18.9 (66.0)	19 (66)	20.9 (69.6)	23.8 (74.8)	26.9 (80.4)	27.2 (81.0)	28.2 (82.8)	24.6 (76.2)
Mean daily minimum °C (°F)	21.5 (70.7)	22 (72)	20.3 (68.5)	18.1 (64.6)	13.6 (56.5)	10.2 (50.4)	10 (50)	12 (54)	15.6 (60.1)	19.1 (66.4)	20.4 (68.7)	21.4 (70.5)	17.0 (62.7)
Average precipitation mm (inches)	90 (3.5)	77 (3.0)	36 (1.4)	22 (0.9)	10 (0.4)	5 (0.2)	2 (0.1)	2 (0.1)	10 (0.4)	17 (0.7)	54 (2.1)	86 (3.4)	411 (16.2)

The climate of the Kruger National Park and lowveld is subtropical/tropical, specifically a hot semi-arid climate (Köppen BSh). Summer days are humid and hot. The rainy season is from September until May. The Kruger National Park website lists September and October as the driest periods, culminating at the beginning of the rainy season late in October. Because the park spans 360 kilometres or 220 miles from north to south, climate can vary throughout the park. Skukuza in the southern part of the park is about 2 to 3 °C (3.6 to 5.4 °F) cooler throughout the year than Pafuri in the north, with significantly more rainfall. The Pafuri floodplain, at less than 300mm per annum, receives the lowest precipitation in the park, and the Pretoriuskop sourveld, at around 700mm per annum, the highest.

== Biodiversity ==
Veld types

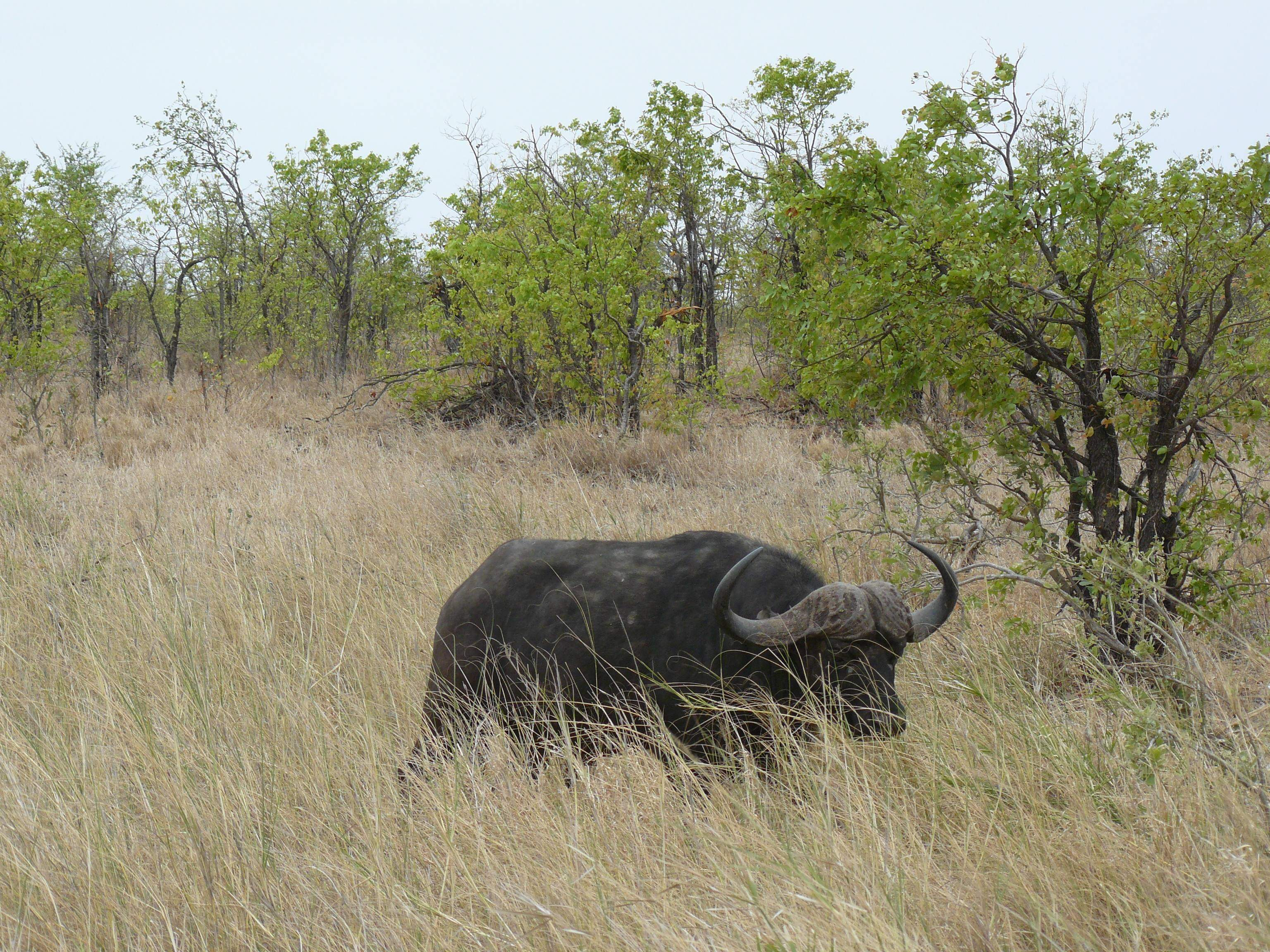
Open savanna grassland in the northern flats

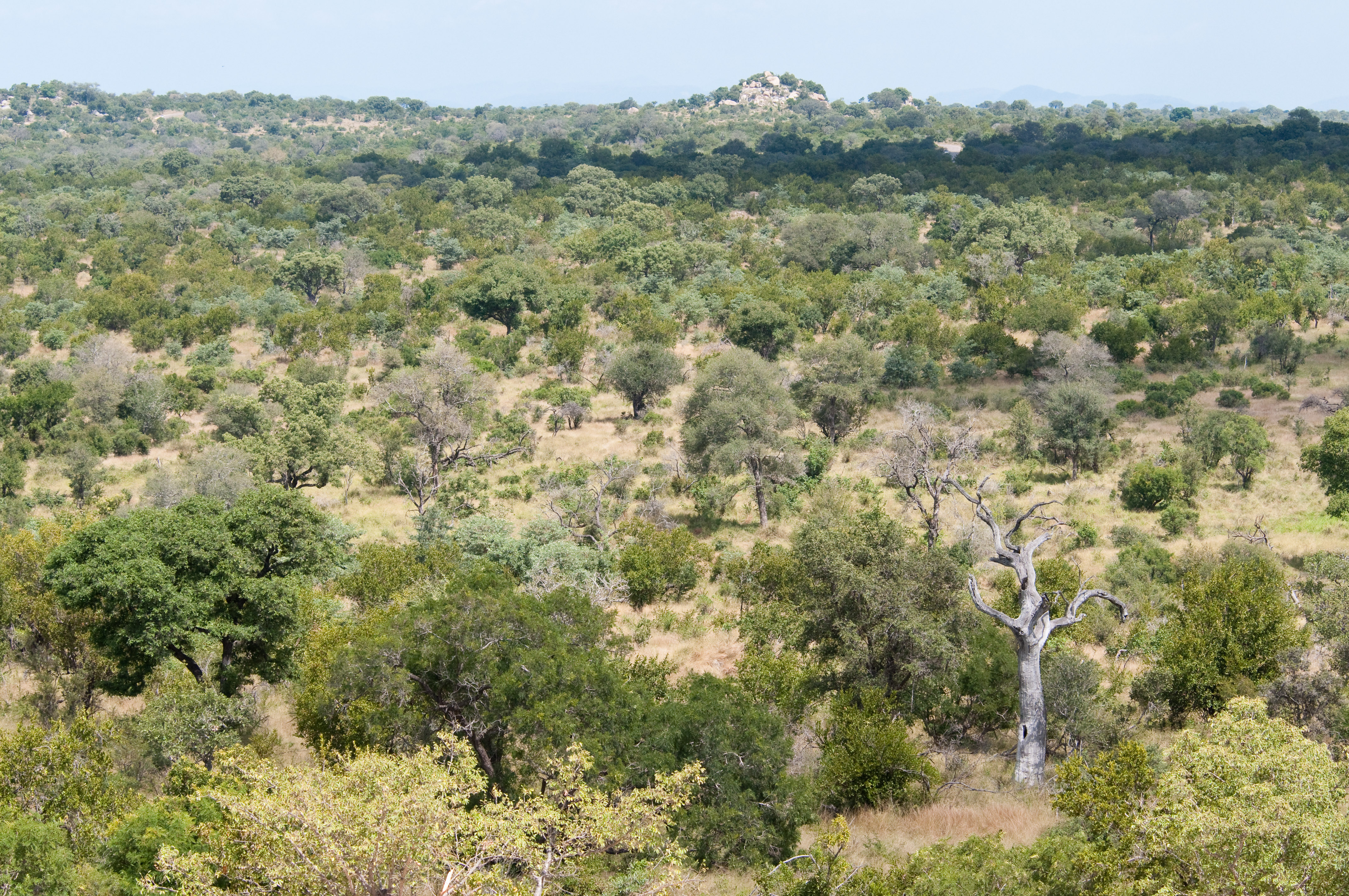
Mixed woodlands in the southwest on granite

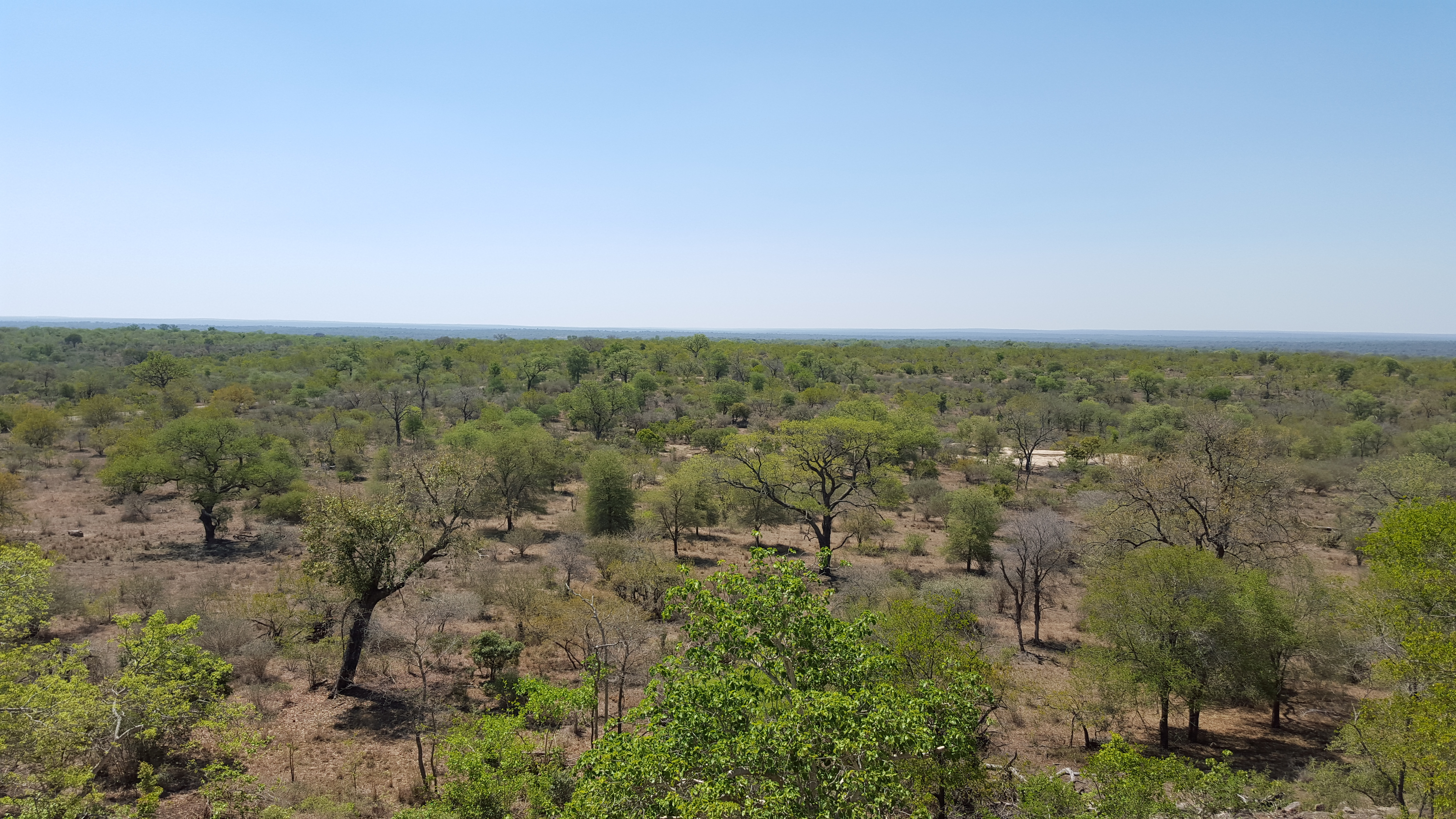
Open savanna on dry basalt flatlands in the southeast

=== Vegetation ===
Plant life consists of four main areas, which correspond roughly to the four quadrants of the park. The main veld types are determined by the rainfall gradient (400 to 750 mm per annum) and geological substrates.

==== Shrub mopane veld ====
Shrub mopane covers almost the entire northeastern part of the park.

==== Red bush-willow and mopane veld ====
This area lies in the park's western half, north of the Olifants River. The two most prominent species here are the red bush-willow (Combretum apiculatum) and the mopane tree (Colophospermum mopane).

==== Thorn trees and red bush-willow veld ====
This area lies between the western boundary and roughly the centre of the park south of the Olifants River. Combretums, such as the red bush-willow (Combretum apiculatum), and Acacia species predominate while there are a great number of marula trees (Sclerocarya afra). The Acacias are dominant along the rivers and streams, the very dense Nwatimhiri bush along the Sabie River between Skukuza and Lower Sabie being a very good example.

==== Knob-thorn and marula veld ====
South of the Olifants River in the park's eastern half, this area provides the most important grazing land. Species such as red grass (Themeda triandra) and buffalo grass (Megathyrsus maximus) predominate while the knob-thorn (Senegalia nigrescens), leadwood (Combretum imberbe) and marula (Sclerocarya afra) are the main tree species.

==== Local vegetation communities ====
Several smaller areas in the park carry distinctive vegetation. The Pretoriuskop sourveld and Malelane mountain bushveld receive relatively high rainfall. Here sickle bush and silver cluster-leaf (Terminalia sericea) are prominent. The sandveld communities northeast of Punda Maria are equally distinctive, with a wide variety of unique plant species. The bush-clad hills along the Levuvhu River also shelter an interesting floral diversity and some near-endemic species.

=== Mammals ===
Mammals

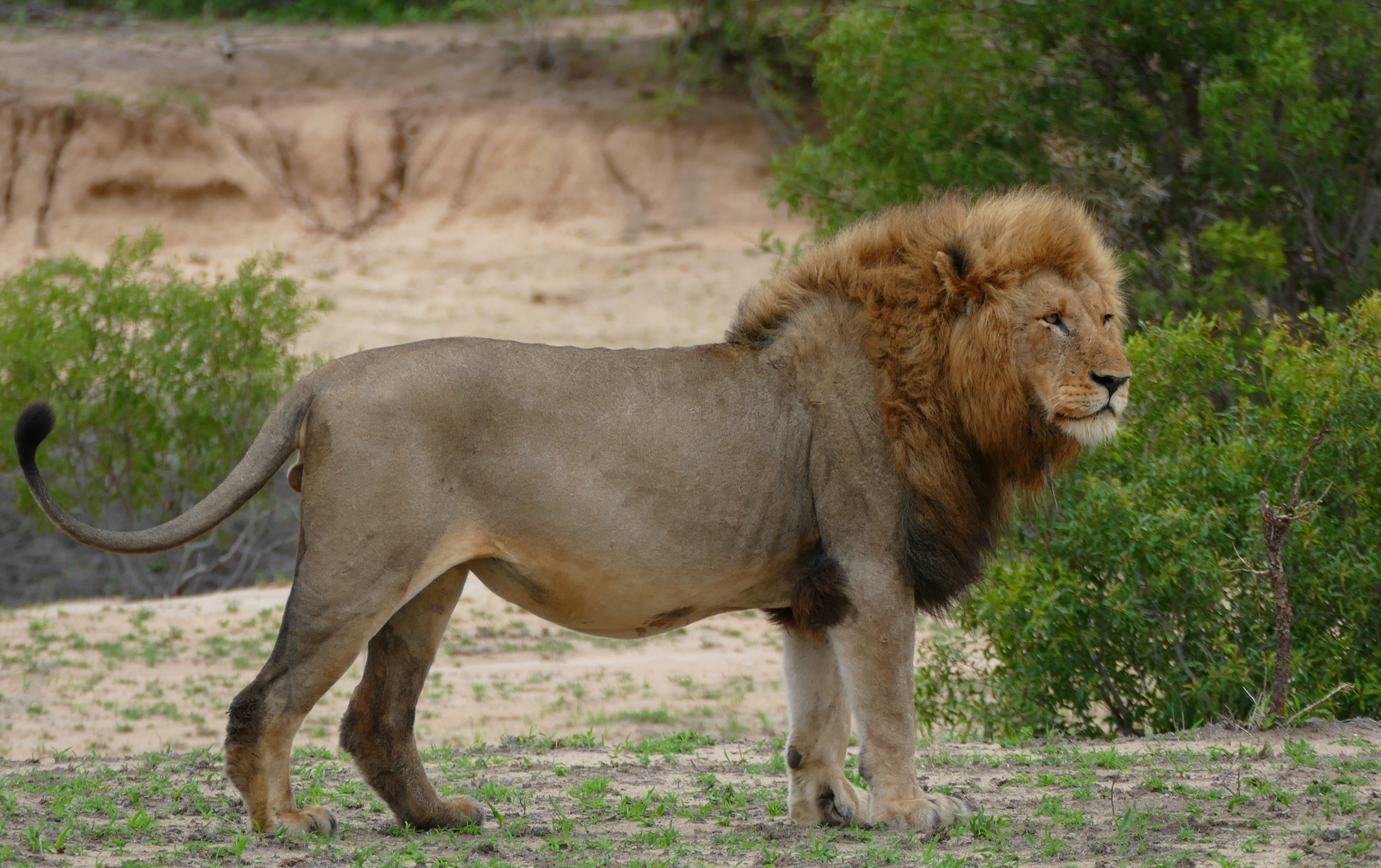
Male lion

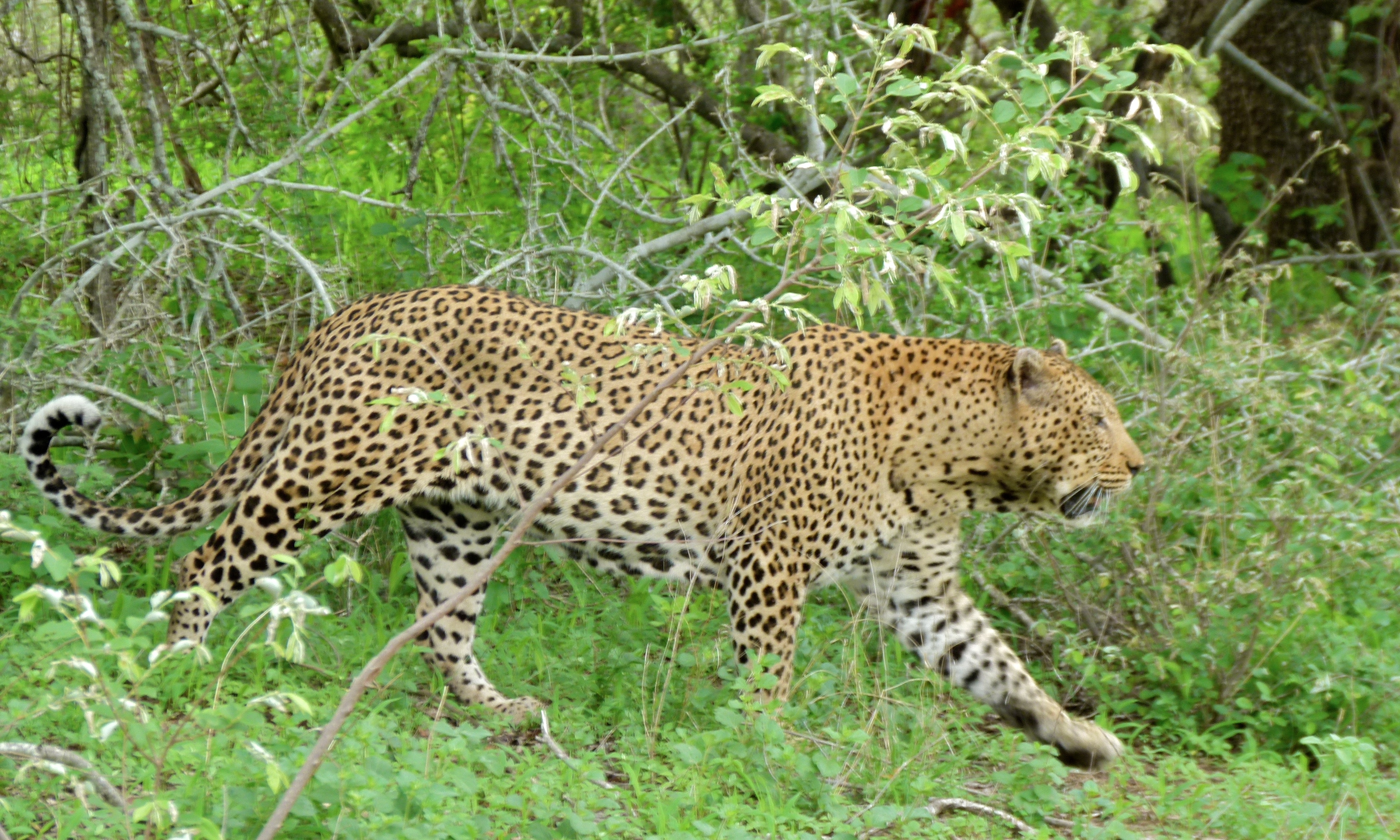
Leopard

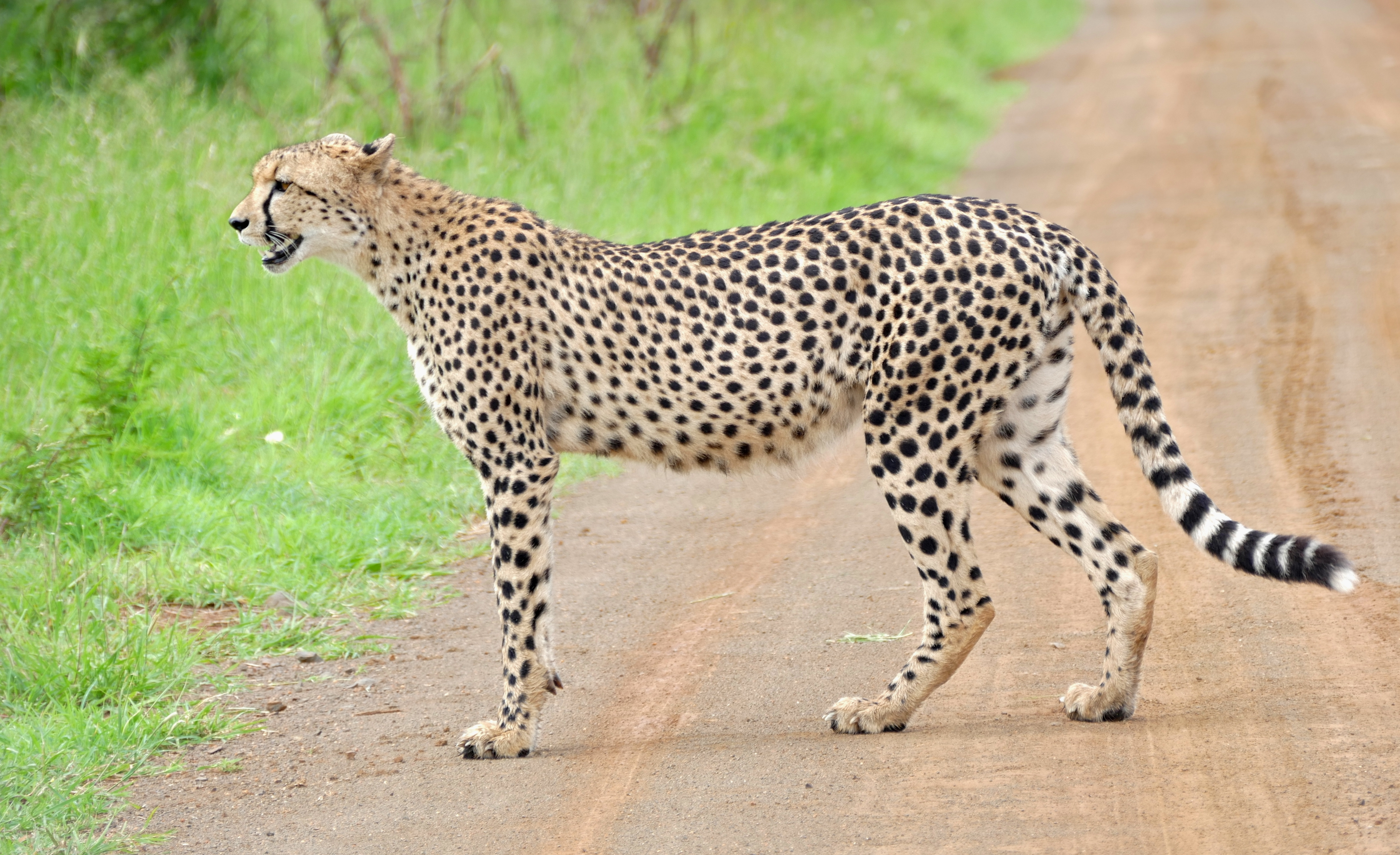
Cheetah

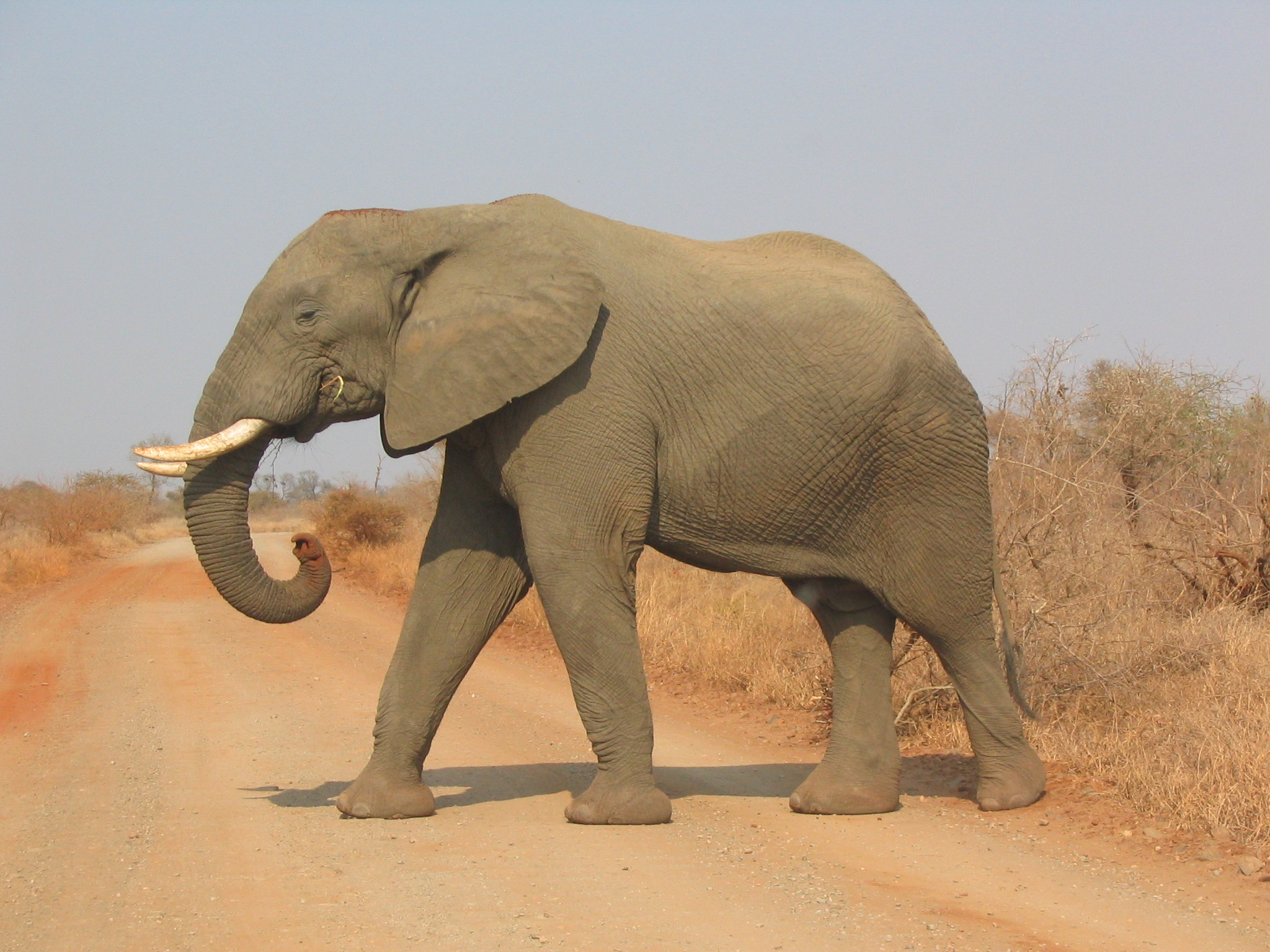
African bush elephant crossing a road

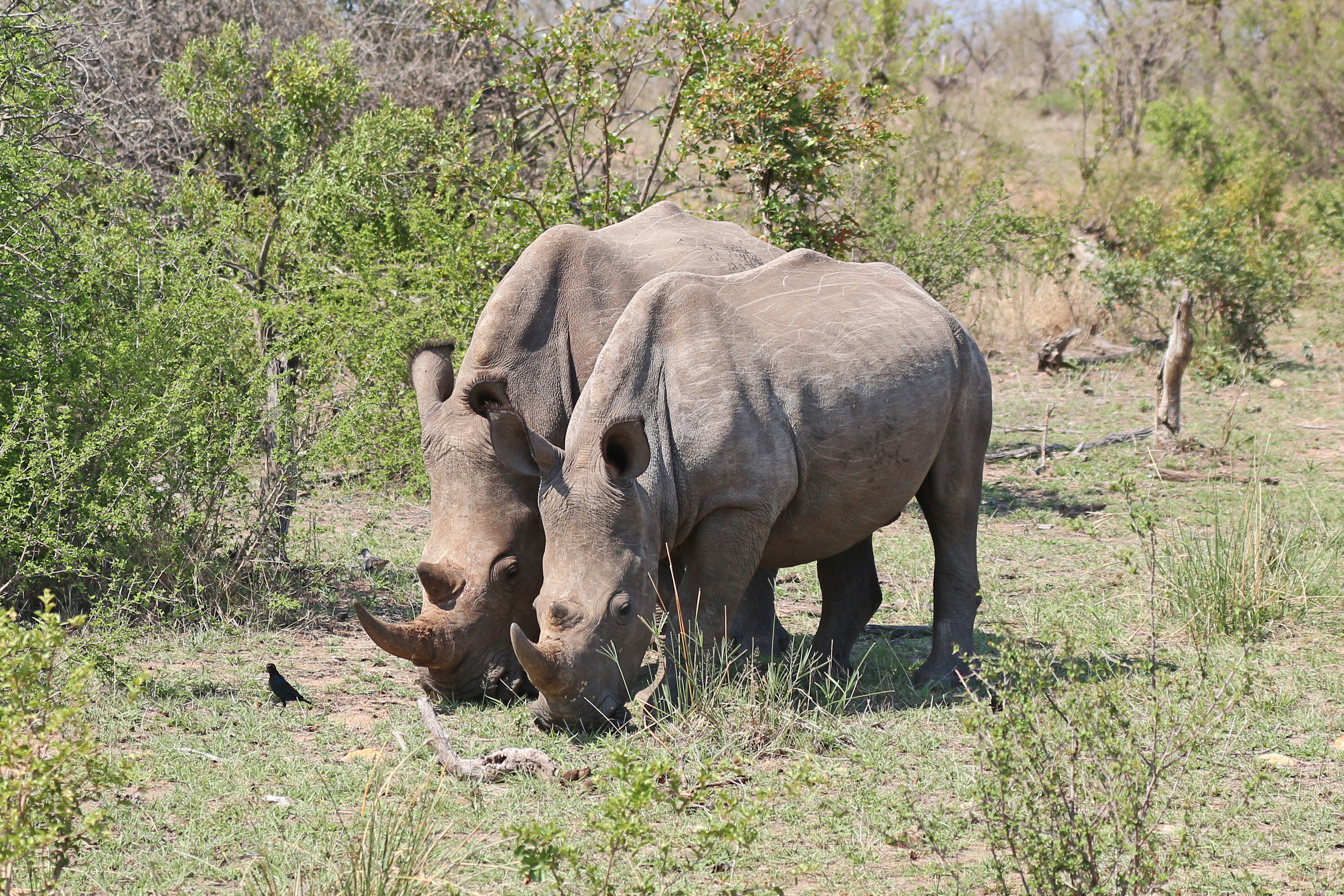
A pair of white rhinoceros

All the big five game animals are found at Kruger National Park, which has more species of large mammals than any other African game reserve (at 147 species). There are webcams set up to observe the wildlife.

Kruger supports packs of the endangered African wild dog, of which there are thought to be only about 400 in the whole of South Africa.

Wildlife population as of 2011
Species	Count (2009)	Count (2010)	Count (2011)
South-central black rhinoceros (D. b. minor)	350	590–660	–
Blue wildebeest (C. t. taurinus)	9,612	11,500	6,400–13,100
Chapman's zebra (E. q. chapmani)	17,797	26,500	23,700–35,300
Bushbuck	500	500	–
African buffalo (S. c. caffer)	27,000	37,500	37,130
Common eland	300	460	460
African bush elephant	11,672	13,700	13,750
South African giraffe (G. c. giraffa)	5,114	9,000	6,800–10,300
Greater kudu (nominate ssp.)	5,798	9,500	11,200–17,300
Hippopotamus (H. a. capensis)	3,000	3,100	3,100
Impala (nominate ssp.)	150,000	120,000	132,300–176,400
Lichtenstein's hartebeest (A. b. lichtensteinii)	–	50	–
Mountain reedbuck (nominate ssp.)	–	150	150
Nyala	–	300	300
Roan antelope (nominate ssp.)	–	90	90
Sable antelope (nominate ssp.)	–	290	290
Common warthog (P. a. sundevallii)	–	3,500	3,100–5,700
Waterbuck (nominate ssp.)	5,000	5,500	3,100–7,800
Southern white rhinoceros (C. s. simum)	7,000 to 12,000	10,500	–
African wild dog (L. p. pictus)	240	–	120
Southeast African cheetah (A. j. jubatus)	120	120	120
Nile crocodile	–	4,420	4,420
African leopard (P. p. pardus)	2,000	1,000	1,000
Lion (P. l. melanochaita)	2,800	1,600	1,620–1,720
Spotted hyena	2,000	3,500	5,340

=== Birds ===
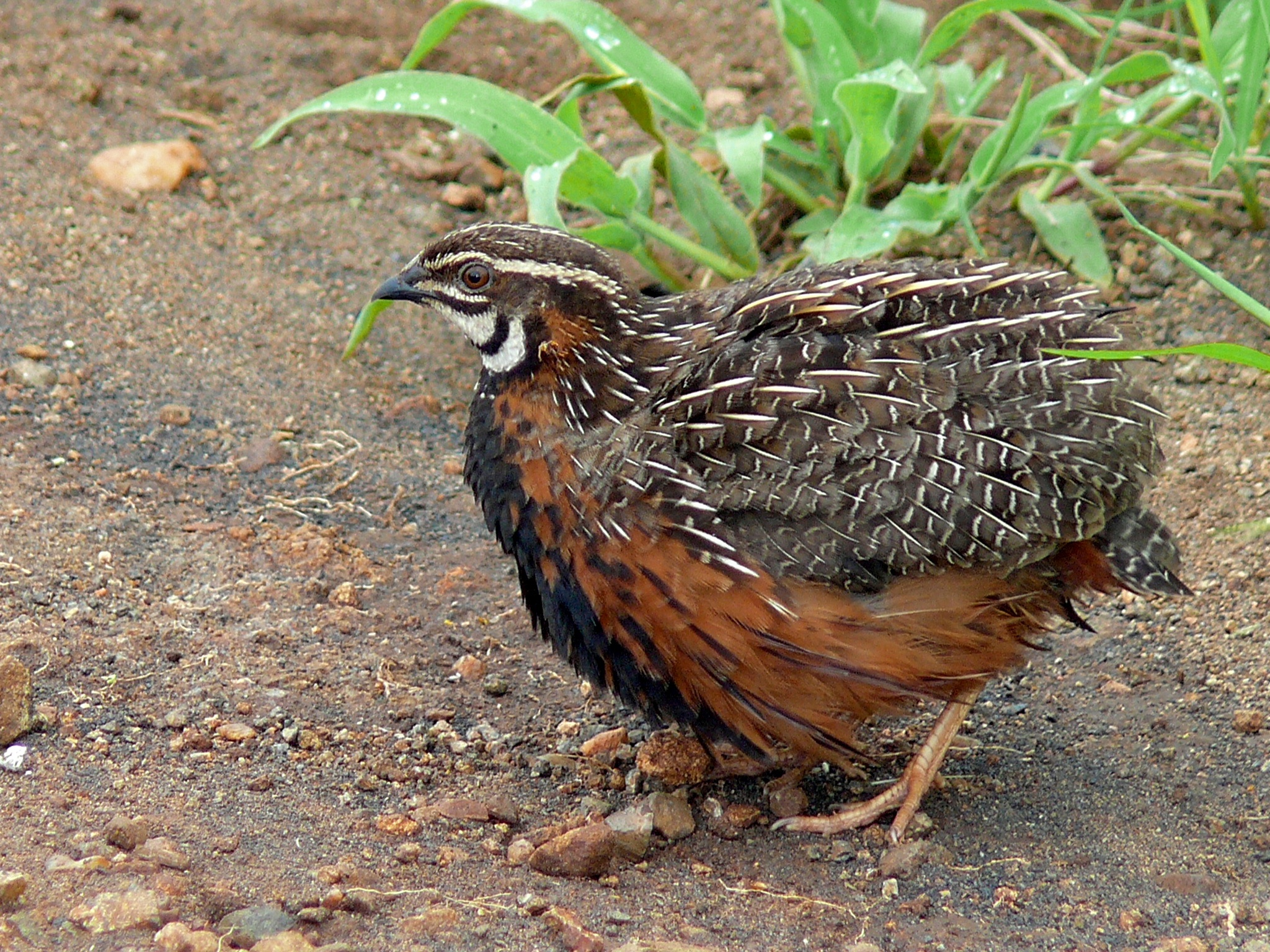
Harlequin quail (C. delegorguei)

A fairly uniform aggregate of bird species is present from the southern to central areas of the park, but a decline in diversity is noticeable in the mopane-dominated flats northwards of the Olifants. Most species breed in summer when rains sustain most vegetable and animal food, but the larger birds of prey conversely breed during the dry winter, when their prey is most exposed.

Constituting the southern lowveld, the park's avifaunal affinities are mainly with the tropical north. Some representatives of this group are the African openbill, hooded vulture, Dickinson's kestrel, white-crowned lapwing, brown-necked parrot, Senegal coucal, broad-billed roller, trumpeter hornbill, Böhm's spinetail, tropical boubou, Meves's starling and scarlet-chested sunbird. Some 30 waterbird and wader species are dependent on the rivers or associated dams, including the African finfoot, white-backed night heron, white-crowned lapwing and water thick-knee. Other species are limited to riparian thicket or forest, including African goshawk, crested guineafowl, Natal spurfowl, Narina trogon, Pel's fishing owl, bearded scrub robin, terrestrial brownbul and black-throated wattle-eye. This habitat is often reduced by drought or floods or the understorey is opened up by elephant.

Some of the larger birds require large territories or are sensitive to habitat degradation. Six of these birds, which are by and large restricted to Kruger and other extensive conservation areas, have been assigned to a fanciful grouping called the "Big Six Birds". They are the lappet-faced vulture, martial eagle, saddle-billed stork, kori bustard, ground hornbill and the reclusive Pel's fishing owl, which is localized and seldom seen. The 2011 aerial survey found 22 martial eagle nest sites, the 2015 survey an additional 17, while the 2020 survey found 70 nest locations in all, though the activity of these has yet to be determined. There are 25 to 30 breeding pairs of saddle-billed storks in the park, besides a handful of non-breeding individuals. In 2012 178 family groups of ground hornbills roamed the park and 78 nests were known, of which 50% were active. In 2013, it was estimated that 904 pairs of white-backed vulture, 78 pairs of lappet-faced vulture and 60 pairs of white-headed vulture breed in the park.

=== Other vertebrates ===
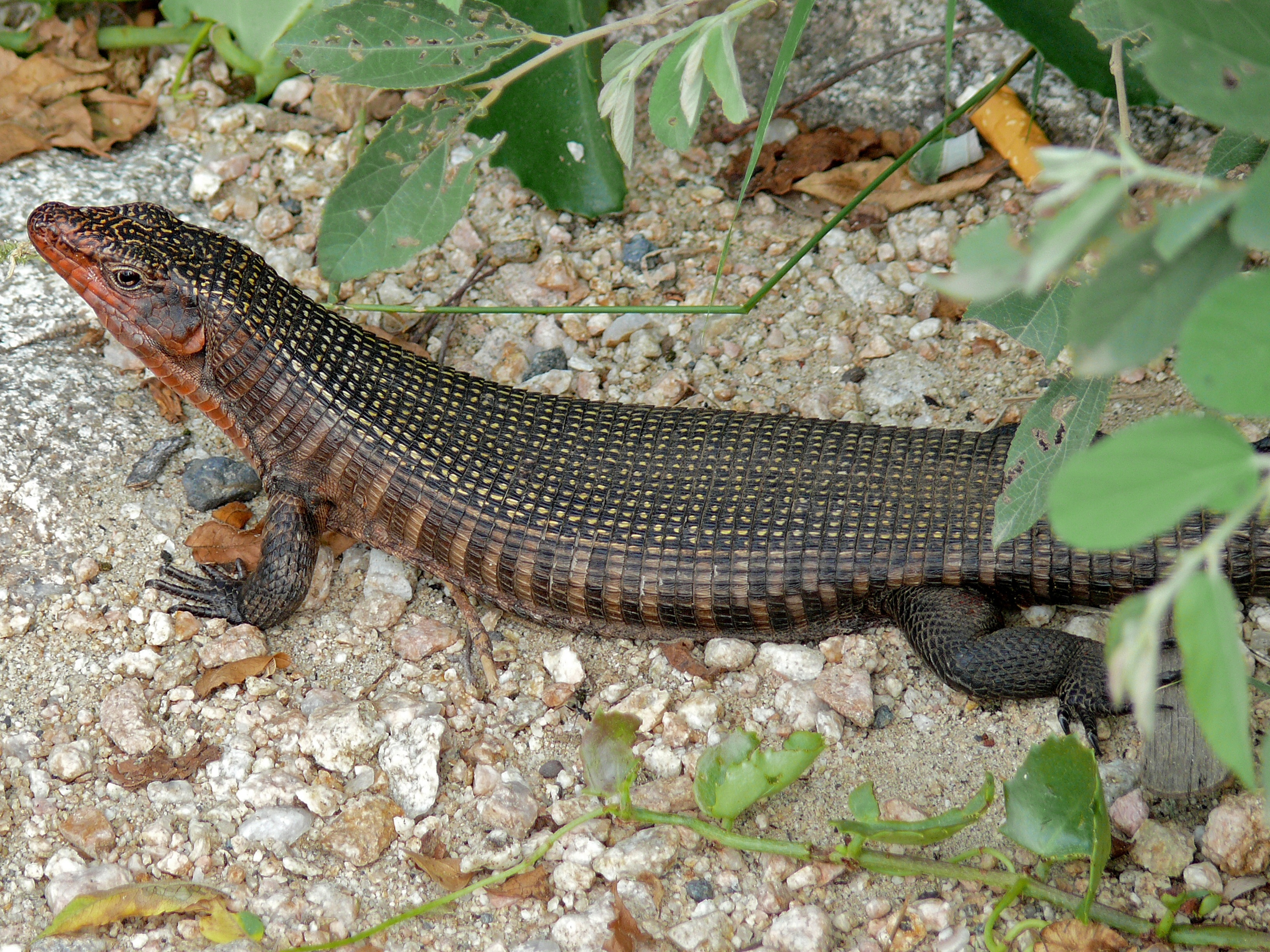
Giant plated lizards are native to the rocky outcrops, koppies, and granite areas.

Kruger is inhabited by 114 species of reptile, including snakes, one wide-ranging chameleon species (Chamaeleo dilepis), lizards (8 families including geckos, skinks and agamas), tortoises (3 species), terrapins (3 species) and an estimated 3,000 individuals of Nile crocodile. Some 54 of the reptile species are snakes, and these include the well-known African rock python, puff adder, black mamba and boomslang, besides three species of true cobra (genus Naja). The majority of local snake species are harmless to humans. As yet, knowledge of the densities and distributions of the reptiles, especially on smaller spatial scales, is limited by sampling bias and a strong dependence on the park's public infrastructure is evident.

34 species of amphibians are found in the park, as well as 49 fish species. These include two species of omnivorous, airbreathing catfish (genus Clarias), of which C. gariepinus occurs abundantly and supports the large crocodile population. Various additional species of bottom-feeding fish occur, including Tilapia (2 species) and Oreochromis (2 species, native and exotic) which feed on hippopotamus dung and dead skin flakes, or other detritus and algae. The tigerfish, a strong-swimming predator with sharp, interlocking teeth, occurs in all six major river systems. As they are sensitive to cold water, they migrate downstream (or into Massingir Dam) for winter.

A few killifish species (genera Nothobranchius and Micropanchax) inhabit ephemeral rain pans and temporary pools, and a population of West African lungfish (subspecies P. a. brieni) is sustained by the pan and floodplain systems in the far north. Four species of freshwater eel, notably Anguilla bengalensis and A. mossambica, migrate up Kruger's rivers and reside for years in their predatory yellow eel stage. Adults return to the Indian Ocean where they spawn and die near Madagascar or the Mascarene Ridge. A Zambezi shark, Carcharhinus leucas, also known as the bull shark, was caught at the confluence of the Limpopo and Luvuvhu Rivers in July 1950. Zambezi sharks tolerate fresh water and can travel far up rivers like the Limpopo.

=== Invertebrates ===
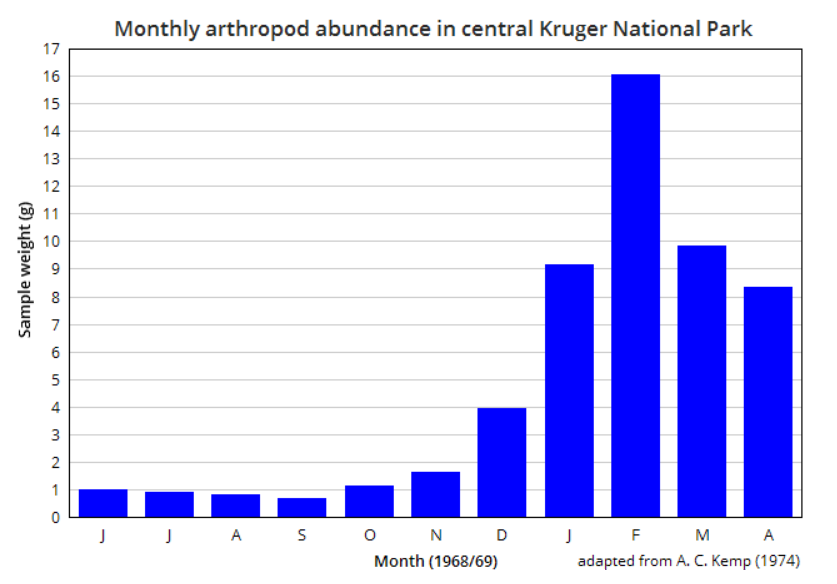
A seasonally fluctuating biomass of arthropods is observed in response to the summer rainfall regime and the mostly deciduous vegetation, as shown by sampling during 11 months in grassland near Satara Camp.

219 species of butterfly and skipper are native to the park. The fastest and most robust of these belong to the genus Charaxes, of which 12 species have been recorded. Genera Papilio and Acraea are also well-represented, with about 10 and 15 species respectively. The total number of Lepidoptera species in the park is unknown but could be in the order of 7,000, many of which range widely in African savanna. The mopane moth in the northern half of the park is one of the best known, and communities outside the park have at times been given permits to harvest their caterpillars. The park has a high diversity of termites and 22 genera are known to occur, including the mound-building genera Macrotermes, Cubitermes, Amitermes, Odontotermes and Trinervitermes. A new species of woodlouse, Ctenorillo meyeri, has been discovered inside termite nests, east of Phalaborwa and near Mopani Rest Camp. It is the first instance of a termitophilous species from the family Armadillidae. Many species of mosquito occur in the park, including the Culex, Aedes and Anopheles genera which target mammals. A. arabiensis is the most prevalent of the 9 or more Anopheles species in the park, and their females transmit malaria. As of 2018, 350 species of arachnids, excluding ticks and mites, are known from Kruger. These are mostly true spiders, including 7 species of baboon spider, but also 9 scorpion and 7 pseudoscorpion species, 18 solifugid species (sun and roman spiders), 2 species of harvestmen and 1 species of tailless whip scorpion.

== Threats ==
The park's ecosystem is subject to several threats, including intensive poaching, urban development at its borders, global warming and droughts, animal overpopulation, and mining projects.

Light pollution produced by rest camps and nearby towns affects the biodiversity of Kruger National Park. In particular, it alters the composition of nocturnal wildlife and the hunting behaviour of predators. In 2022 it was announced that Nkosi City, an R8 billion development is planned near the western border of the park.

Floods or raising of the walls of the Massingir and Corumana dams in Mozambique could potentially damage, by silting, the pristine gorges of the Olifants and Sabie rivers respectively. The Olifants River Gorge has a deep, single thread, pool-rapid structure which is home to many crocodiles, besides hippos and fish. The fish population of the Olifants has already been diminished by hundreds of dams in its upper reaches.

Landscape-collaboration initiatives linked to the Greater Kruger landscape have included durable-finance work under the Mega Living Landscapes programme, in which Conservation South Africa has participated.

== Anti-poaching measures ==
Kruger National Park's anti-poaching unit consists of 650 game rangers, assisted by the South African Police Service and the South African National Defence Force including the South African Air Force. As of 2013, the park is equipped with two drones borrowed from Denel and two Aérospatiale Gazelle helicopters, donated by the Royal Air Force to augment its air space presence. Automated movement sensors relay intrusions along the Mozambique border to a control center, and a specialist dog unit has been introduced. Buffer zones have been established along the border with Mozambique, from where many poachers have infiltrated the park, as an alternative to costly new fences. The original 150 km long fences were dropped in 2002 to establish the Great Limpopo Transfrontier Park. The national anti-poaching committee oversees all activities and coordinates interested parties.

=== Poachers ===
Kruger's big game poachers operate with night vision instruments and large caliber rifles, fitted with suppressors and sophisticated telescopic sights. They are mostly Mozambique citizens who initiate their carefully planned incursions from the border region of South Africa and Mozambique. In 2012, about 200 poachers were apprehended, while about 30 were killed in skirmishes. In July 2012, a Kruger game ranger and policeman were the first to die in an anti-poaching operation, while other employees reported intimidation by poachers. A Kruger personnel strike affected some anti-poaching operations, and some employees have been directly implicated. Rangers in and around the park have been pressured or blackmailed by poaching syndicates to provide intelligence on the whereabouts of rhinos and anti-poaching operations.

In December 2012, Kruger started using a Seeker II drone against rhino poachers, which was loaned to the South African National Parks authority by its manufacturer Denel Dynamics, South Africa.

In June 2019, a Helix surveillance aircraft system was deployed on night missions in the park, and apprehended half a dozen suspected poachers. Other threats to poachers include the dangerous nature of the park itself. In February 2018, a poacher was believed to have been trampled by elephants and then eaten by lions, leaving rangers to later find only a human skull and a pair of trousers, alongside a loaded hunting rifle. In December 2021, two accused poachers were arrested in the Kruger National Park's Skukuza after they were discovered in possession of unauthorized rifles and ammunition.

==== Rhino ====
Poachers make no distinction between white and black rhinos, but losses of black rhinos are low due to their reclusive and aggressive nature. Rhino horn fetches between $66,000 and $82,000 per kilogram, and the CITES ban has proved largely ineffectual against the trade in rhino horn. The second horn is sometimes also removed from the skull to obtain about 100 ml of moisture that is sold locally for use in traditional medicine, known as Muti.

Poaching rhino horn escalated in the 21st century, with 949 rhinos killed in Kruger in the first 12 years, and more than 520 in 2013 alone. A memorandum of agreement is seen as a necessary milestone in stemming the tide between South Africa and Vietnam, in addition to the one with China, while negotiations have not yet started with Thailand. The amount of rhino horn held in storage is not publicly known. Since 2009, some Kruger rhinos have been fitted with invisible tracing devices in their bodies and horns which enable officials to locate their carcasses and to track the smuggled horns by satellite. South Africa's 22,000 white and black rhinos represent some 93% of these species' world population, 12,000 of which are found in Kruger.

In July 2022, Navara, an elephant poacher who frequented Kruger, was arrested in Maputo in a sting operation for possessing rhino horns. As of 2023, he is serving a 30-year prison sentence.

==== Elephant ====
Kruger experienced significant elephant poaching in the 1980s. Due to international and national efforts, including a worldwide ban on ivory sales beginning in 1989, the poaching was abated for many years, but a sharp rise in 2014 has continued and the numbers of elephants poached per year in the park is growing at an alarming rate.

Following approval by CITES, 47 tonnes of stockpiled ivory from Kruger were auctioned on 6 November 2008. The sale fetched approximately US$6.7 million which was allocated to increased anti-poaching measures. The intention was to flood the market, crash prices and make poaching less profitable. But instead, the legal sale was followed by "an abrupt, significant, permanent, robust and geographically widespread increase" in elephant poaching, as subsequent research showed.

The 2019 Convention on the International Trade in Endangered Species of Wild Flora and Fauna summit voted down proposals for further one-off ivory sales from stockpiles for having led to increases in poaching across the continent. Across the continent the African elephant population decreased 30% in the period between 2007 and 2014.

=== Other ===
It is foreseen that the placement of wire traps to procure meat would eventually become the most challenging form of poaching. A scheme has been proposed to reward adjacent communities with the proceeds of game sales in return for their cooperation in game preservation. The larger communities include Acornhoek, Bushbuckridge, Hazyview, Hoedspruit, Komatipoort, Malelane, Marloth Park, Nelspruit and Phalaborwa. Communities along the northern boundary have complained about a number of issues that affect them, including livestock killed by escaped predators. In 2021 and 2022 there were cases of poisoning of carcasses near Punda Maria, evidently to obtain the body parts of scavengers. In 2025, at least 123 vultures died in a mass poisoning caused by the consumption of an elephant carcass laced by poachers with pesticides at the park.

== Gates to the Kruger Park ==
North & South Gates
Kruger National Park

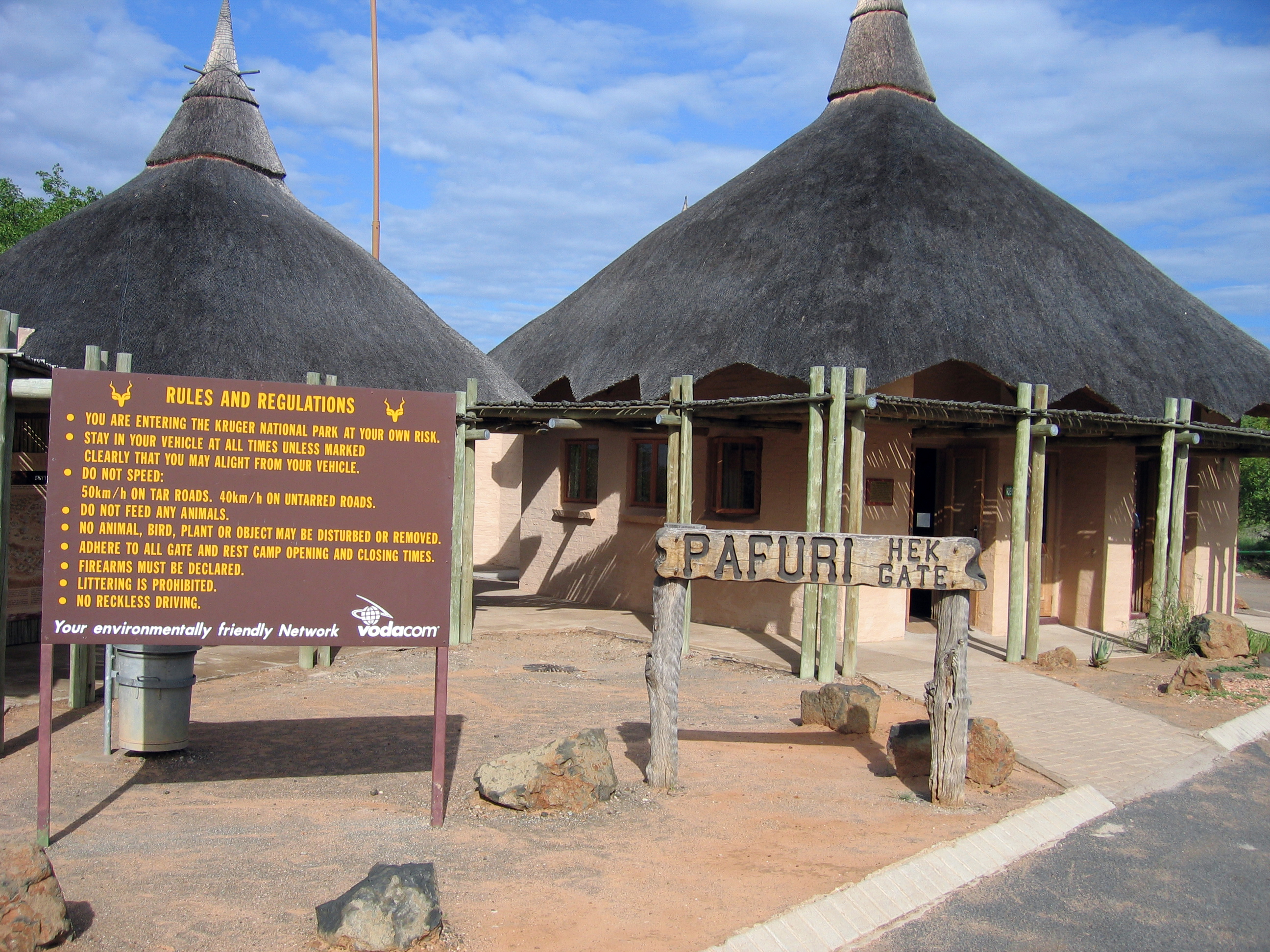
Pafuri Gate
(northernmost entrance to the park)

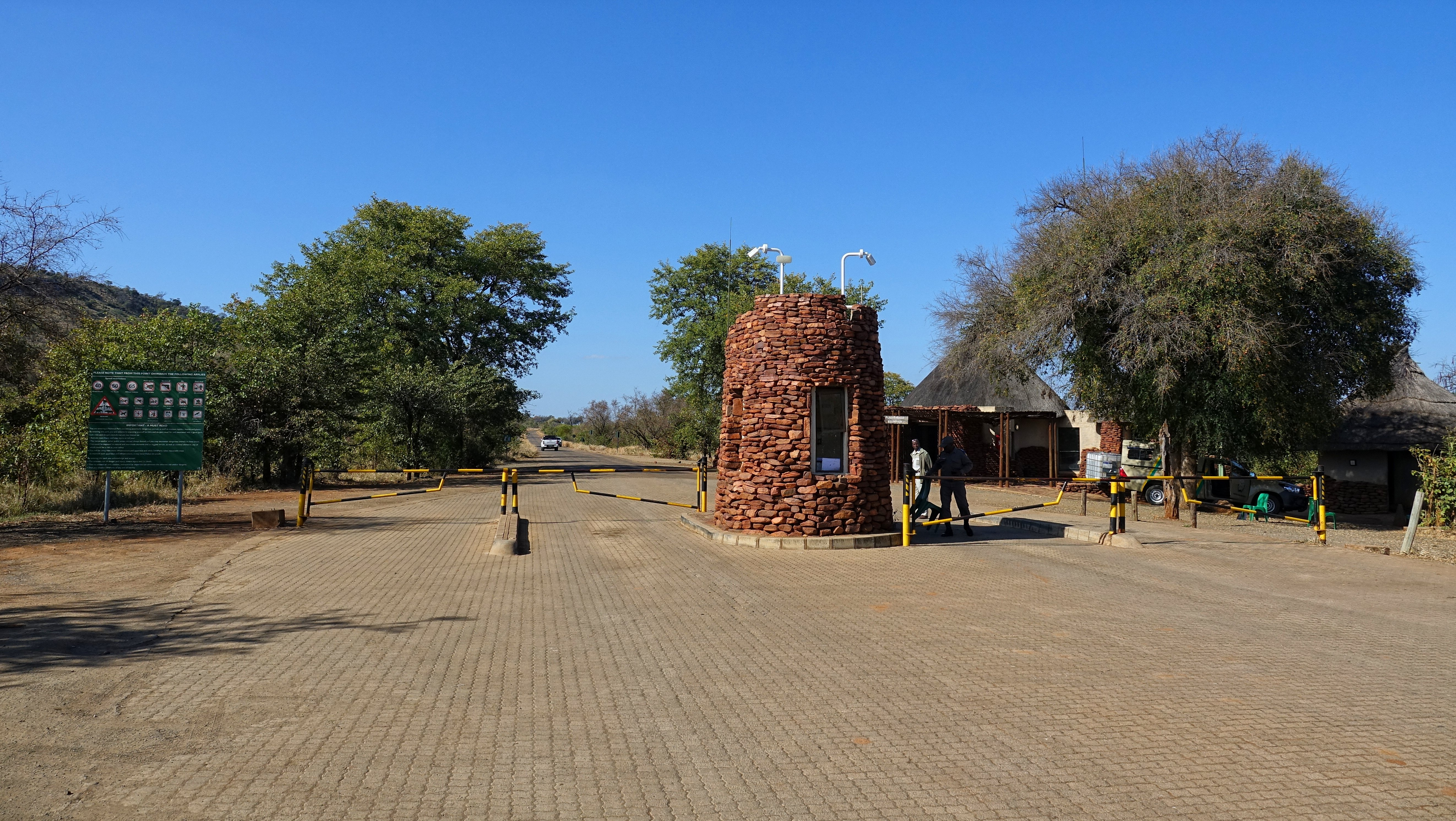
Punda Maria Gate
(another northern entrance)

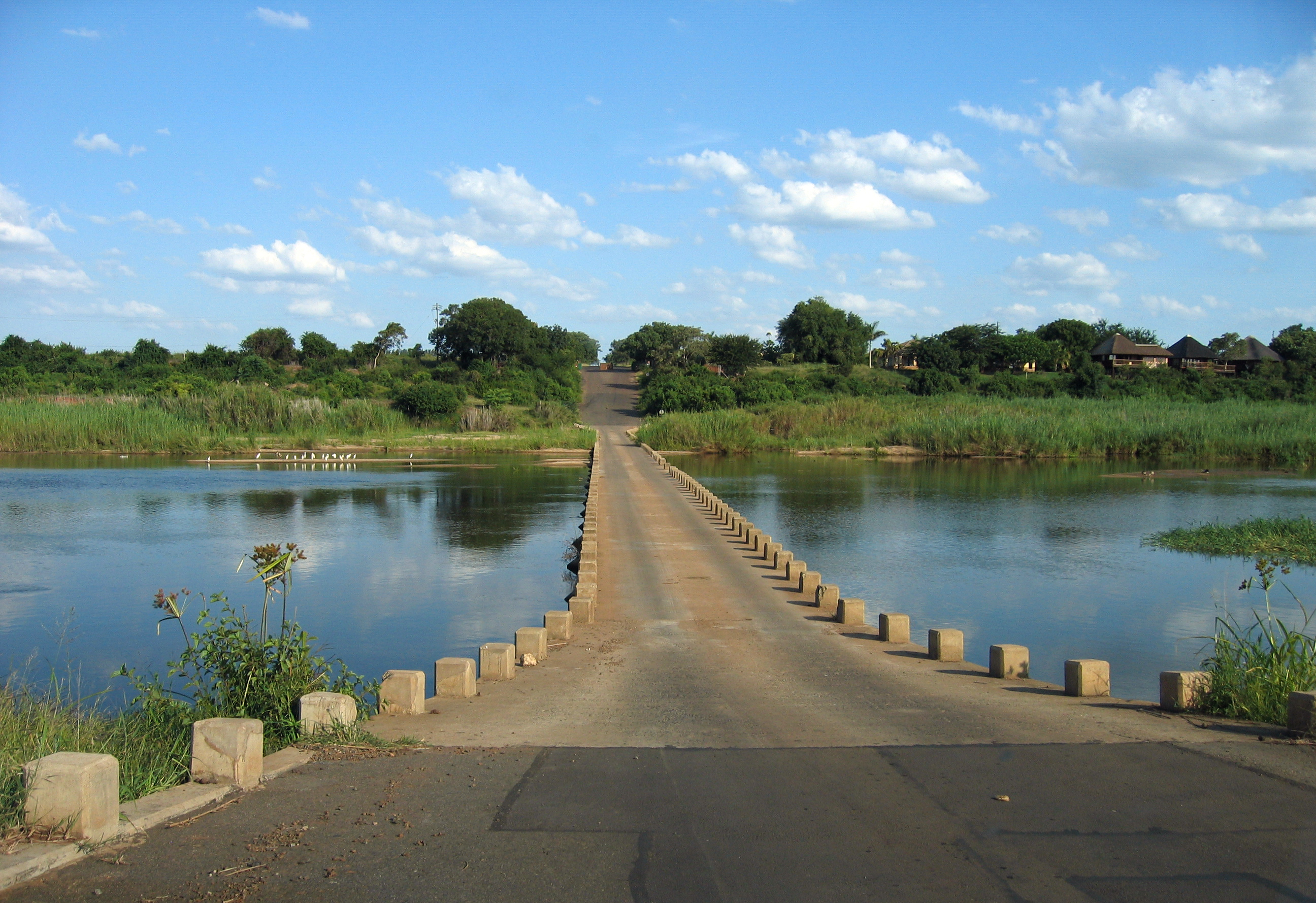
Crocodile Bridge
(a southeastern entrance to the park)

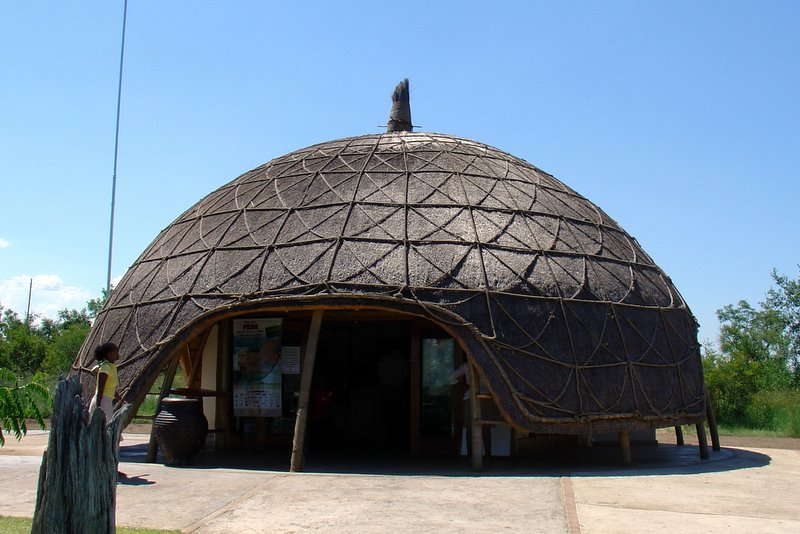
Phabeni Gate
(a southwestern entrance to the park)

The Kruger Park has the following gates:

Name	Road	From Town	Coordinates
Crocodile Bridge Gate	on the R571 road	from Komatipoort	25°21′30″S 31°53′37″E
Malelane Gate	on the R570 off the N4	near Malelane	25°27′43″S 31°31′59″E
Numbi Gate	on the R569 road	from Hazyview	25°9′19″S 31°11′51″E
Phabeni Gate	on the road off the R536	from Hazyview	25°01′30″S 31°14′29″E
Paul Kruger Gate	on the R536 road	from Hazyview	24°58′53″S 31°29′7″E
Orpen Gate	on the R531 road	from Klaserie	24°28′33″S 31°23′27″E
Phalaborwa Gate	on the R71 road	from Phalaborwa	23°56′44″S 31°9′54″E
Punda Maria Gate	on the R524 road	from Thohoyandou	22°44′18″S 31°0′33″E
Pafuri Gate	on the R525 road	from Musina	22°24′1″S 31°2′29″E

== See also ==
- List of protected areas of South Africa
- Abel Chapman
- Battle at Kruger
- Great Limpopo Transfrontier Park
- Hemmersbach Rhino Force
- Kruger to Canyons Biosphere
- Kruger National Park in the 1960s (a timeline of events)
- Makuleke
- Sabi Sand Game Reserve
- SanWild Wildlife Sanctuary
- Thulamela
