= Hemmersbach Rhino Force =

Conservation organization

- Founded: 2016
- Founder: Ralph Koczwara
- Type: Privately founded
- Purpose: Animal conservation
- Location: Nuremberg, Germany
- Region served: Africa
- Method: Direct action
- Website: rhino-force.org

Hemmersbach Rhino Force is a direct action conservation organization acting with a focus on the African rhinos. Rhino Force's main activities consist of anti-poaching rangers in the Greater Kruger National Park, a biobank called Hemmersbach Rhino Force Cryovault to preserve rhino genes and the Black Rhino Reintroduction to bring back rhinos to the Mid Zambezi Valley in Zimbabwe.

== History ==
The company was founded in 2016 by Ralph Koczwara, an IT businessman from Nuremberg, Germany. Koczwara learned about the rhino-poaching crisis while he was on a photo safari through the South African Greater Kruger National Park as a tourist. In 2019, the TV program ZDF filmed their operations in Middle Zambezi Valley, Zimbabwe which focused on conservation efforts for elephants. In 2020, ZDF then filmed a follow-up on the elephants journey across Zimbabwe.

== Operations ==
The company is operating units to protect rhinos from poaching from South Africa and Zimbabwe where 80% of rhinos are living. However, the nature of the work leads Rhino Force to counter all illegal activities in the bush and surrounding community. Due to the severity of the pangolin poaching crisis, this has become an important focus of Rhino Force.

All actions are performed in cooperation with South African and Zimbabwean law enforcement authorities, which have the legal powers to legitimize the conducted actions. They use surveillance technology such as seismic sensors, tracking sensors and infrared radars. Besides this, Rhino Force places value in reading and blurring tracks (combat tracking). In order to avoid poachers from entering reservation areas and killing animals, Rhino Force applies an “8 Step Operational Plan”, a crime prevention methodology to organize and steer Anti-Poaching activities.

== Cryovault ==
In 2018, the company diversified their operations away from solely engaging in military-based approaches to conservation. It is a biobank, which is located in South Africa and preserves deeply frozen sperm, egg cells and other genetic material of African Rhinoceros. These gametes are collected by veterinarians during various situations e.g. closely after a Rhinoceros death or following on a dehorning procedure.

The project aims to enable future assisted reproduction of Rhinoceros by applying genetics collected and cryopreserved. Moreover, to establish a reference database for this species. Any material collected will be banked alongside animal biometrical, environment and location data, which provides crucial information for the studying of population dynamics.
