= Mopani Rest Camp =

Rest camp in Kruger National Park, South Africa

Mopani
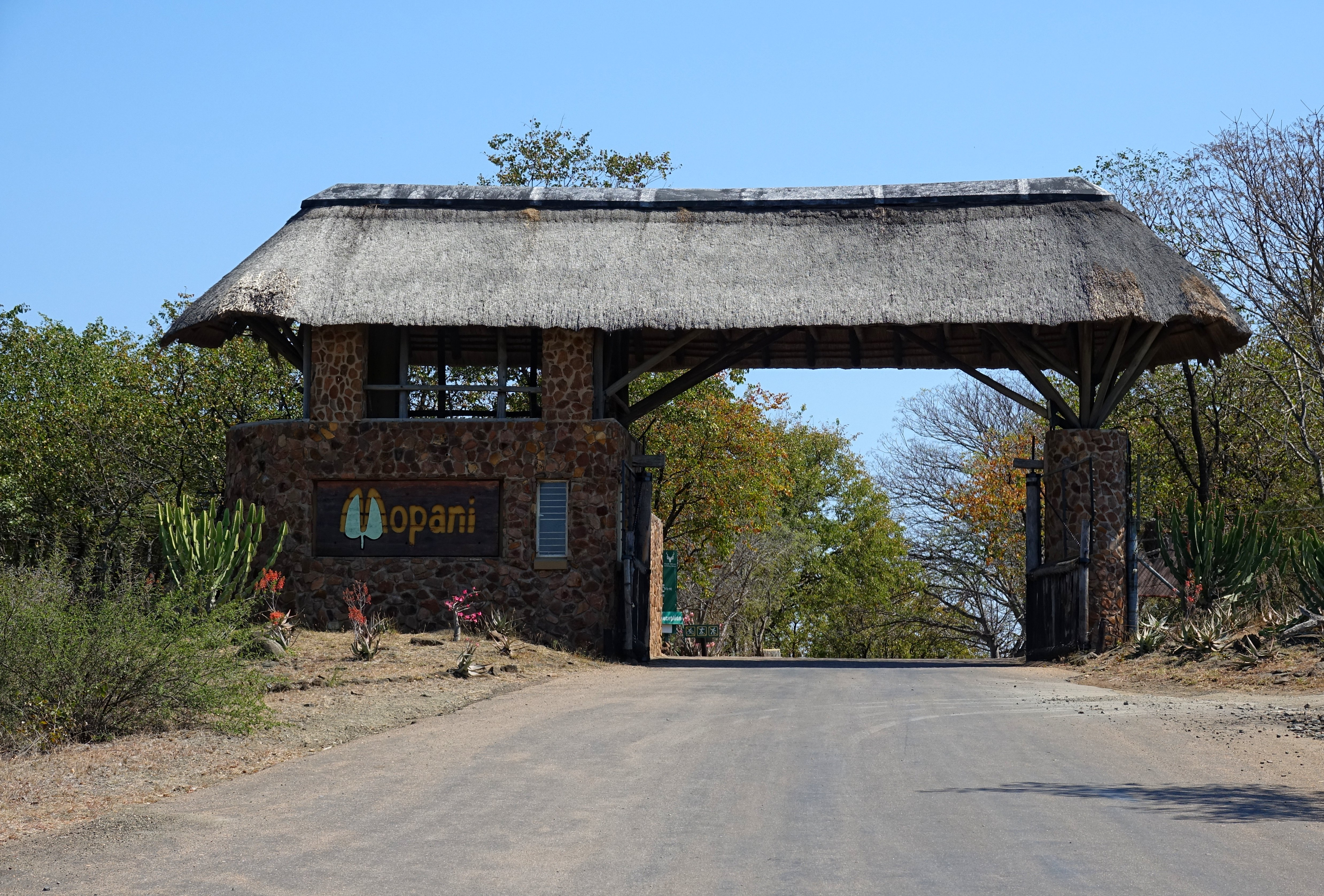
- Entrance to Mopani
- Interactive map of Mopani
- Location: North bank of Pioneer dam along the Tsendze River
- Coordinates: 23.5207°S 31.3969°E
- Elevation: 319 m (1,047 ft)
- Residences: 45 four-bed bungalows (2 wheelchair accessible); 12 four-bed cottages with a 2-bed bedroom and 2 sleeper couches; 46 six-bed (3 bedroom) guest cottages; Xanatseni Guest House (sleeps 8, one wheelchair accessible bedroom)
- Caravans: 0
- Restaurants: Park restaurant
- Facilities: Day Visitors picnic area; Conference facilities; Swimming pool; Shop; Laundromat; Petrol station; Mobile phone reception
- Water: potable
- Operated by: South African National Parks
- Established: 1989
- Website: www.sanparks.org/parks/kruger/camps/mopani/

Mopani is a rest camp in Kruger National Park, South Africa. It lies along the northern shore of the Pioneer Dam on the Tsendze River.

== Activities ==
Mopani was one of the first camps to offer a Sunset Drive-Boma Braai combo activity. This is a combination of the standard Sunset Drive game drive and Boma Braai (a catered braai in a boma near the camp). Park staff also offer guided bush walks, game drives, bush breakfasts and bush braais. The western portion of the camp contains a walking trail along the fence, with views of the lake.

=== Nearby attractions ===
Mopani is only 12 km (7.5 mi) south of the Tropic of Capricorn. There is a sign and parking space on the tarred road north of camp at the tropic. Visitors are allowed to disembark from their vehicles at this spot (at their own risk). South of camp on the southern bank of the river (although a 4 km (2.5 mi) drive away) is the Pioneer Dam Bird Hide, as well as the Shipandani sleep-over Hide.

== Facilities ==
In addition to the restaurant, shop, laundromat and filling station, Mopani provides a conference centre with space for up to 300 people.

== Accommodation ==
Mopani is a cottage-only lodge, providing no camping facilities. It is able to sleep up to 498 people in a variety of bungalows, cottages and guest cottages. The Xanatseni guest house can sleep a further 8 people.

== Shipandani sleep-over bird hide ==
On the southern bank of the Tsendze River, a short way downstream of Mopani, is the Shipandani sleep-over bird hide. While it is a standard hide during the day, it can be booked as accommodation for 2-6 guests. The hide provides fairly primitive accommodation, with no electricity and only an outdoor toilet. An outdoor kitchen, including cutlery and crockery, is also available for guests.
