= SanWild Wildlife Sanctuary =

Coordinates: 24.0353190000°S 30.5194030000°E

- Interactive map of SanWild Wildlife Sanctuary
- Location: Limpopo Province, South Africa
- Nearest town: Gravelotte
- Area: 3,000 ha (12 sq mi)
- Website: www.sanwild.org

The SanWild Wildlife Sanctuary is a 3,000 ha (7,400 acres) wildlife reserve and rehabilitation facility in South Africa's Limpopo Province.

It is operated by SanWild Wildlife Trust, a registered non-profit organization. The sanctuary provides care for injured, orphaned, or displaced wildlife and manages natural enclosures for animals that cannot be released into the wild. It also functions as a protected reserve for species native to the region. SanWild is located between Gravelotte and Leydsdorp, near the western edge of Kruger National Park.

== History and mission ==
SanWild Wildlife Sanctuary was founded in 1998 by South African conservationist Louise Joubert. Before establishing the sanctuary, Joubert worked in fundraising and conservation support, including a campaign for the Rhino & Elephant Foundation in South Africa in 1989. Her later work with a game capture and relocation company exposed her to the risks and injuries associated with wildlife handling and relocation, and Joubert began hand-rearing orphaned animals.

In 1998, Joubert leased a small tract of Lowveld land in Limpopo Province, with an option to purchase after five years. The site was developed as a wildlife rehabilitation facility combined with a managed, protected reserve. In 2000, she formally established the SanWild Wildlife Trust, a registered South African wildlife charity and non-profit organisation.

From its early years, the sanctuary focused on caring for injured, orphaned, or displaced wildlife, with the aim of rehabilitating and releasing animals where possible. Animals that could not be safely returned to the wild were retained in long-term enclosures designed to limit human contact while allowing normal movement and behaviour in a natural habitat.

Under Joubert’s leadership, SanWild expanded from a small rehabilitation centre into a larger sanctuary and reserve. During this period, the organisation relied primarily on donor funding to support veterinary care, reserve management, and species protection activities.

Since Joubert’s death in 2018, under Trust Chairman Didi Schoeman the sanctuary has transitioned from donor financing to funding through paid initiatives and services. SanWild’s Scout Ranger Volunteer Program enables conservation enthusiasts to make a financial contribution while getting hands-on experience assisting with conservation activities on site.

SanWild Sanctuary is a working wildlife sanctuary rather than a safari park. Visitor access is secondary to conservation operations. Volunteers, along with a limited number of day visitors and overnight guests, may be accommodated at SanWild Lodge, which provides tent-based accommodation on a for-profit basis to support the ongoing operating costs of the sanctuary.

== On-site conservation activities ==
Day-to-day conservation activities at the SanWild Sanctuary focus on wildlife rescue, rehabilitation, habitat management and protecting the reserve itself.

Animals are admitted to the sanctuary for a variety of reasons. Some have been injured in vehicle or farm accidents. Others are orphaned, displaced, released from zoos, or confiscated from illegal activities. After a veterinary assessment, animals undergo rehabilitation with the aim of release. Those that cannot survive in the wild are managed in long-term natural enclosures intended to allow normal movement and behaviour while limiting human contact. Veterinarians visit SanWild regularly to treat injuries, support nutrition and provide ongoing health monitoring. The sanctuary does not operate an on-site clinic or hospital.

Habitat management activities include maintaining fencing and boundary infrastructure, monitoring water sources, and replanting vegetation to support indigenous plant and animal species. This work reduces overgrazing, protects sensitive tree species, and maintains suitable habitat conditions for the resident wildlife. Anti-poaching measures aim to detect unauthorized access and reduce the risk of wildlife crime within the sanctuary. Rangers and dogs conduct regular foot and vehicle patrols. Perimeter fencing is monitored continuously. Surveillance systems are being developed and refined on an ongoing basis.

The mix of conservation activities - and the specific activities that Scout Ranger Volunteers are involved with - varies widely depending on the season, weather conditions, animal admissions, and what the immediate situation demands.

== Fauna ==
The wildlife at SanWild Sanctuary is native to the Limpopo region of South Africa. Free-ranging wildlife lives within the reserve, while protected habitats are provided for animals undergoing rehabilitation or requiring long-term care.

Species present at SanWild have included elephants, rhinoceroses, giraffes, antelope, and large carnivores such as lions, cheetahs, and spotted hyenas. Some animals are rescued from captive or illegal situations and cannot be released due to injury or habituation to humans.

Large predators such as lions and spotted hyenas are housed in natural enclosures and managed under a long-term care programme. Cheetahs are monitored within the reserve as part of a tracking programme that supports population management and cooperation with other reserves. Elephants live as a managed herd within the reserve and are monitored to limit environmental impact and protect sensitive habitat. Rhinos are monitored through patrols and protected with surveillance as part of anti-poaching operations.

SanWild also participates in animal translocation and wildlife gene exchange initiatives with other conservation bodies to support genetic diversity and population management. The mix of species at SanWild changes over time as animals are admitted, rehabilitated, released, relocated, or transferred based on conservation needs and reserve capacity.

== Partnerships ==
SanWild works with a range of conservation organisations, academic institutions, and technical partners in southern Africa and internationally. These partnerships support animal translocations, genetic management, anti-poaching measures, and conservation education related to threats such as poaching and illegal wildlife trafficking.

As part of international rescue and relocation efforts, SanWild has participated in the ROAR II project in cooperation with L’Espace Zoologique. With logistical support from Air France KLM Martinair Cargo, lions released from zoos in France have been transferred to SanWild for long-term care.

SanWild also cooperates with Föreningen Försvara Elefanterna (Defend the Elephants Association) and Linköping University on initiatives focused on the protection of elephants and rhinoceroses. This cooperation includes the development and testing of measures intended to reduce poaching risks.

In the area of wildlife protection technology, SanWild collaborates with Smart Savannahs, an initiative that deploys camera systems, motion sensors, and drone-based monitoring to support faster detection of threats in protected areas. As part of this alliance, SanWild is working with Qulinda Animal Supervision and the University of Johannesburg to develop and test animal monitoring systems that offer cost-effective AI-based alternatives to conventional wildlife collaring.

== Gallery ==
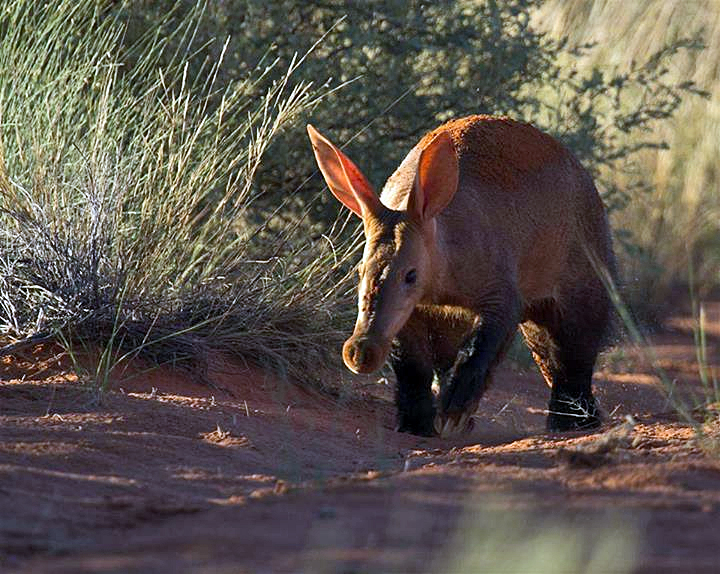
Aardvark

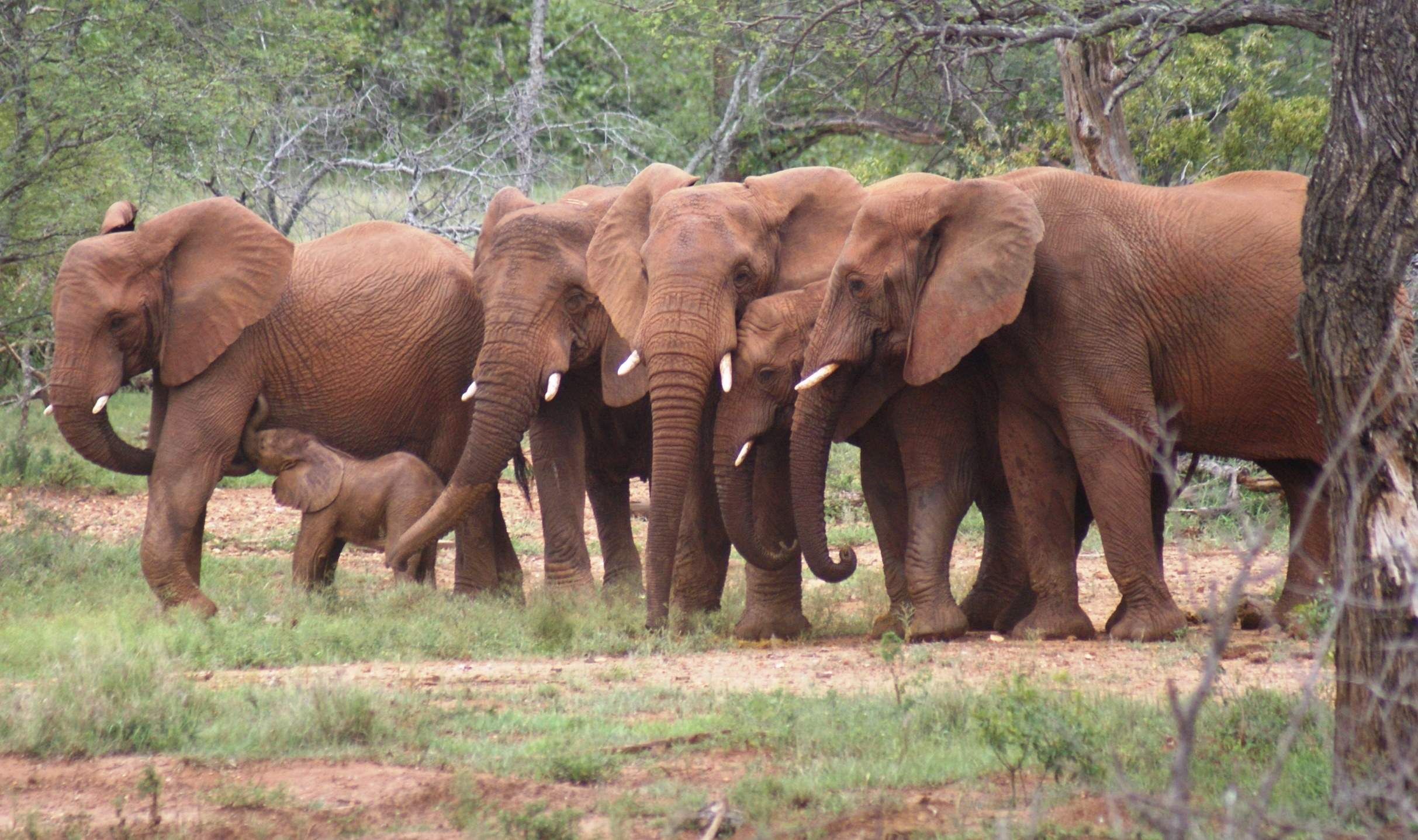
A herd of African bush elephants

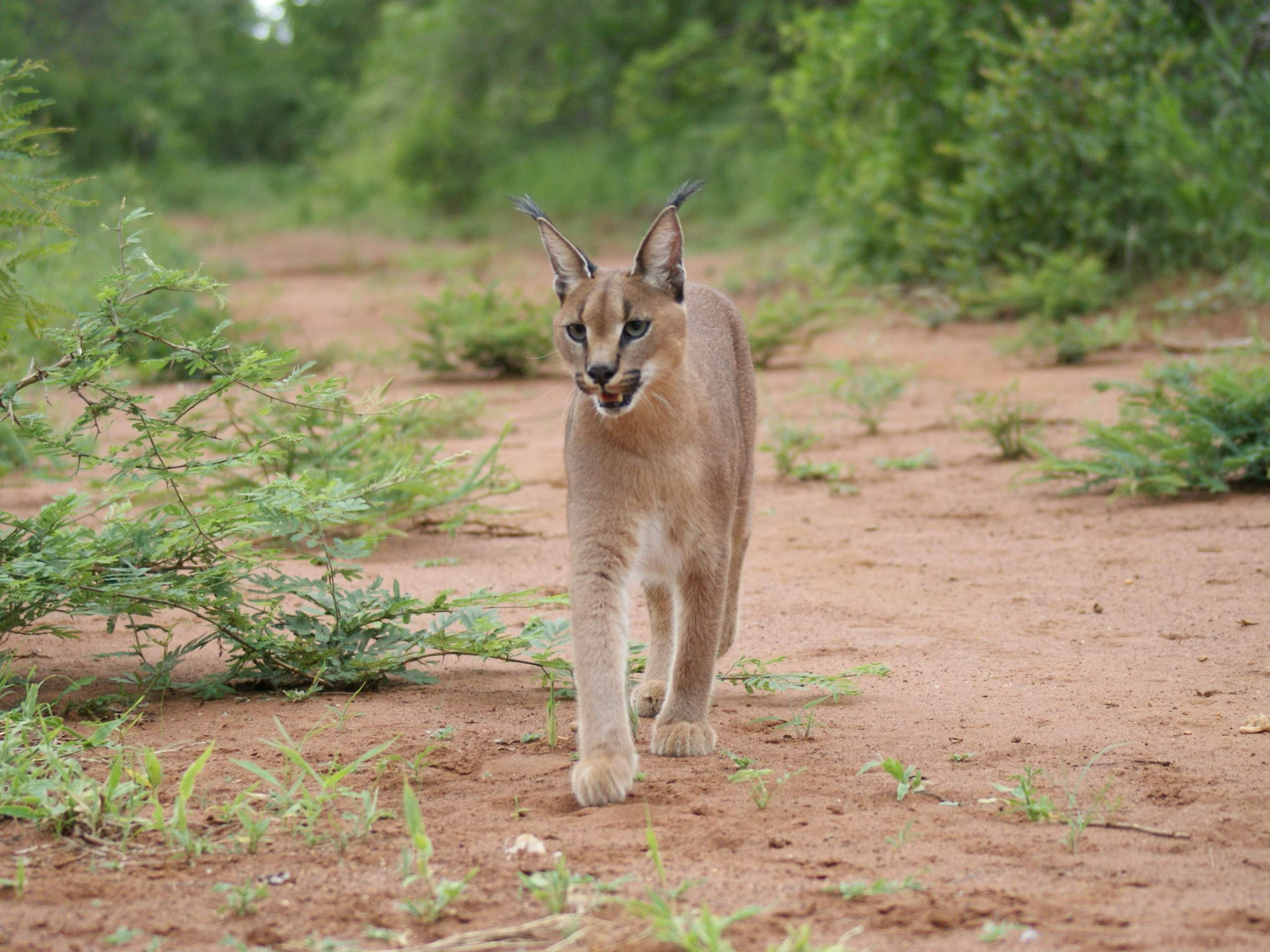
Caracal

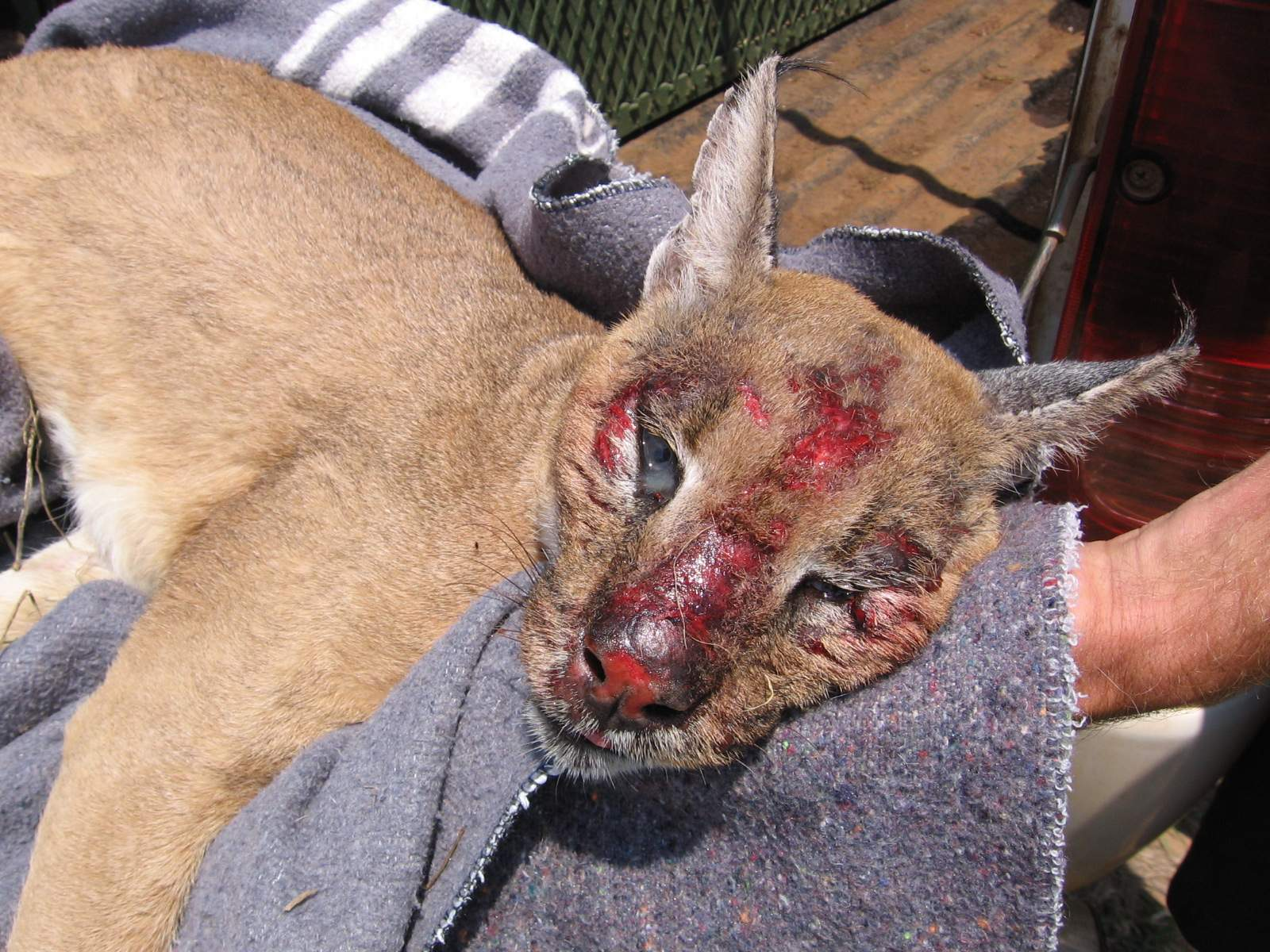
An injured caracal

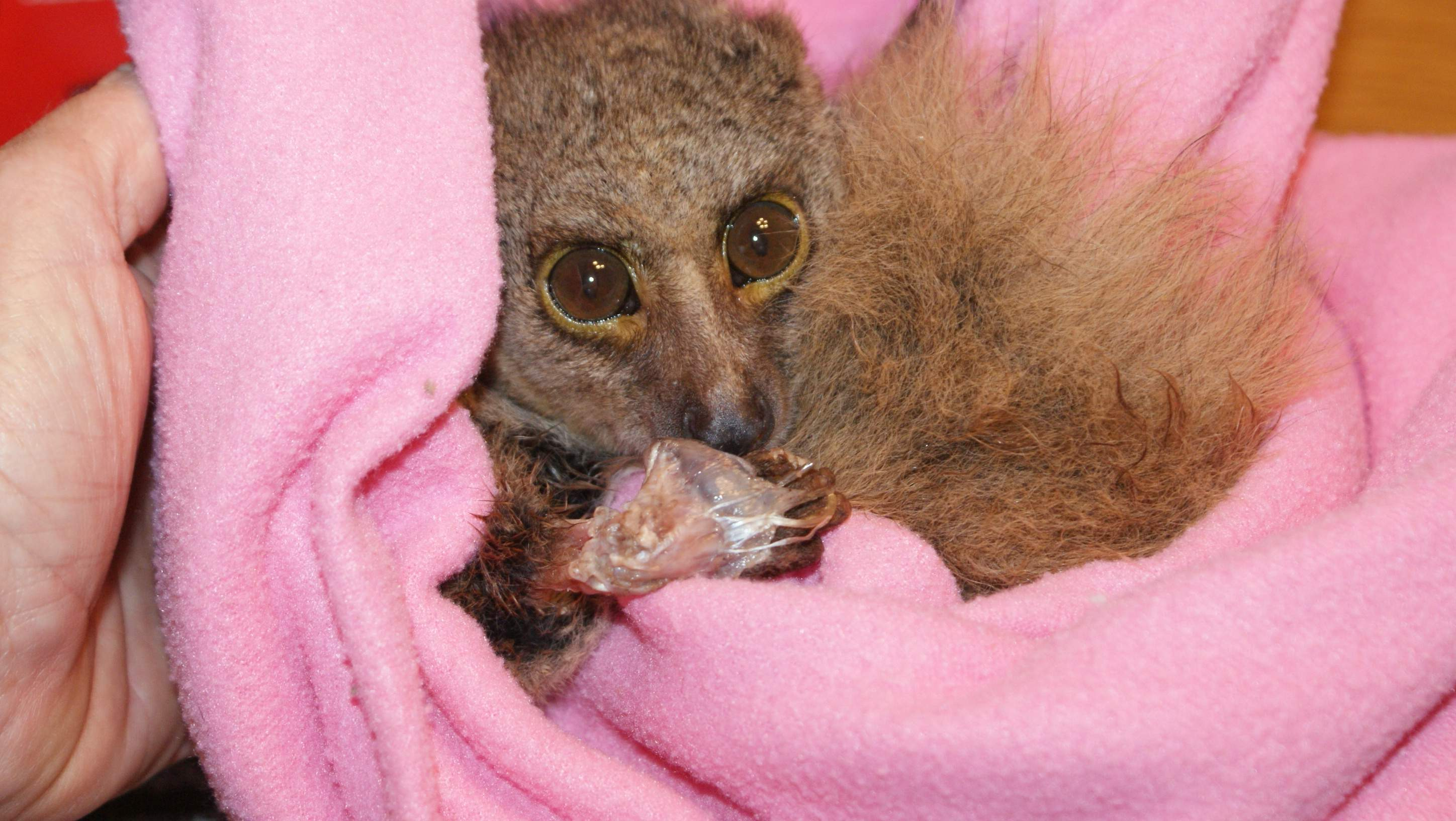
A bush baby with a snare-mutilated arm

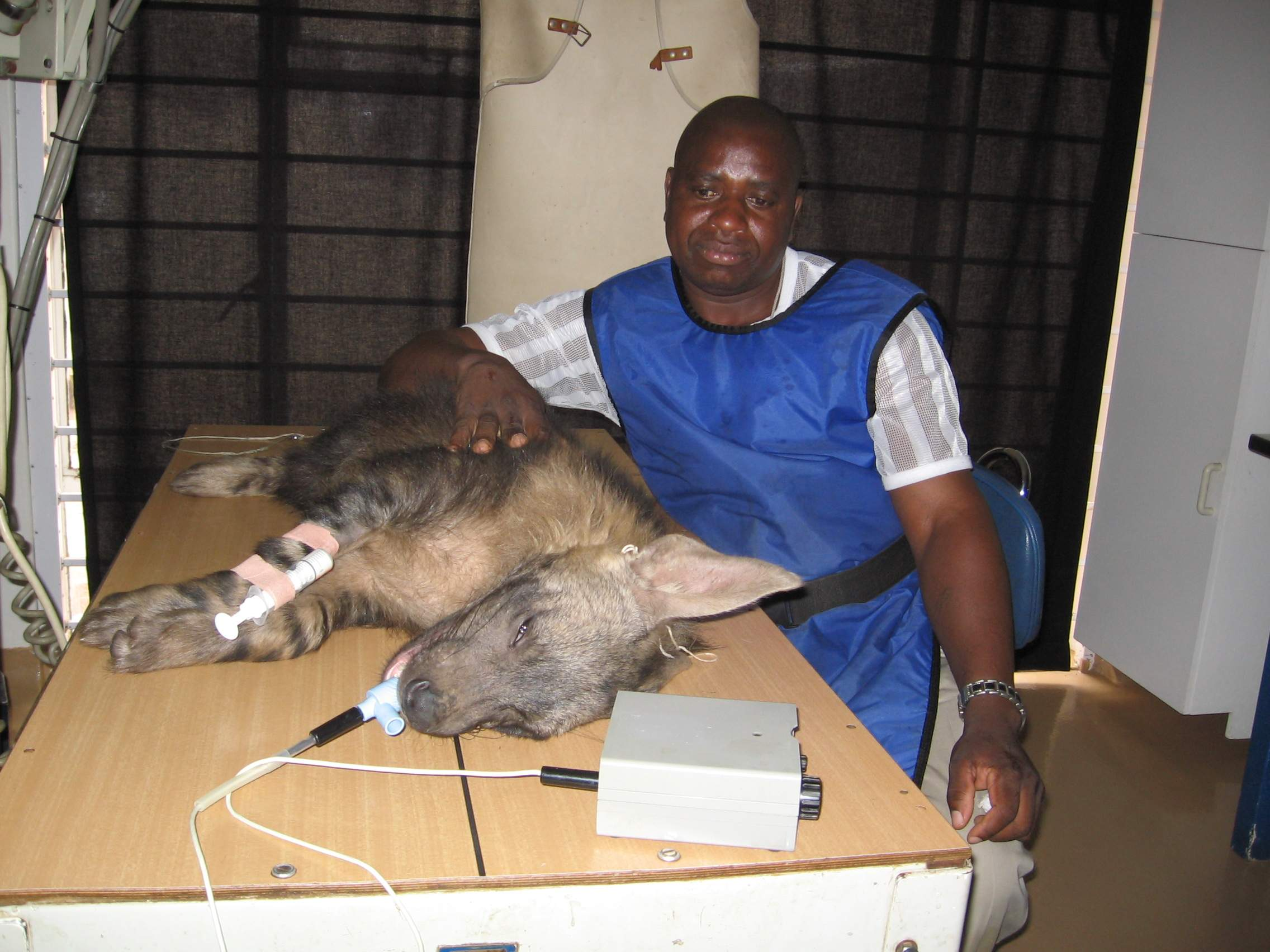
A brown hyena being treated for injuries

== See also ==
- Animal welfare and rights in South Africa
- Animal welfare organisations based in South Africa
