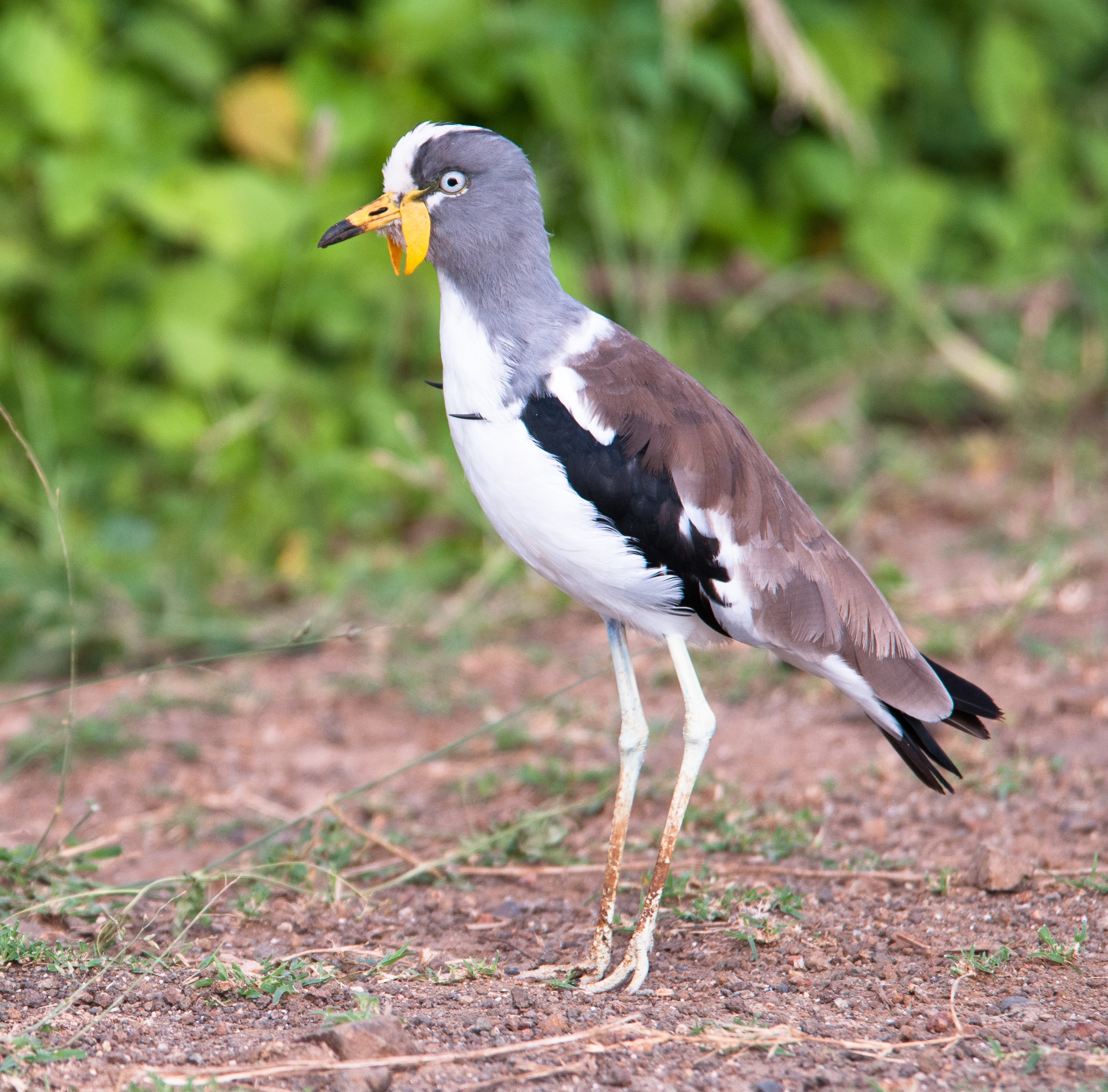

Conservation status
- Least Concern (IUCN 3.1)

Scientific classification
- Kingdom: Animalia
- Phylum: Chordata
- Class: Aves
- Order: Charadriiformes
- Family: Charadriidae
- Genus: Vanellus
- Species: V. albiceps

Binomial name
- Vanellus albiceps Gould, 1834

Synonyms
- Hoplopterus albiceps (Gould, 1834); Vanellus albicep (lapsus); Xiphidiopterus albiceps (Gould, 1834)

= White-crowned lapwing =

Species of bird

The white-crowned lapwing, white-headed lapwing, white-headed plover or white-crowned plover (Vanellus albiceps) is a medium-sized wader. It is resident throughout tropical Africa, usually near large rivers.

== Description ==
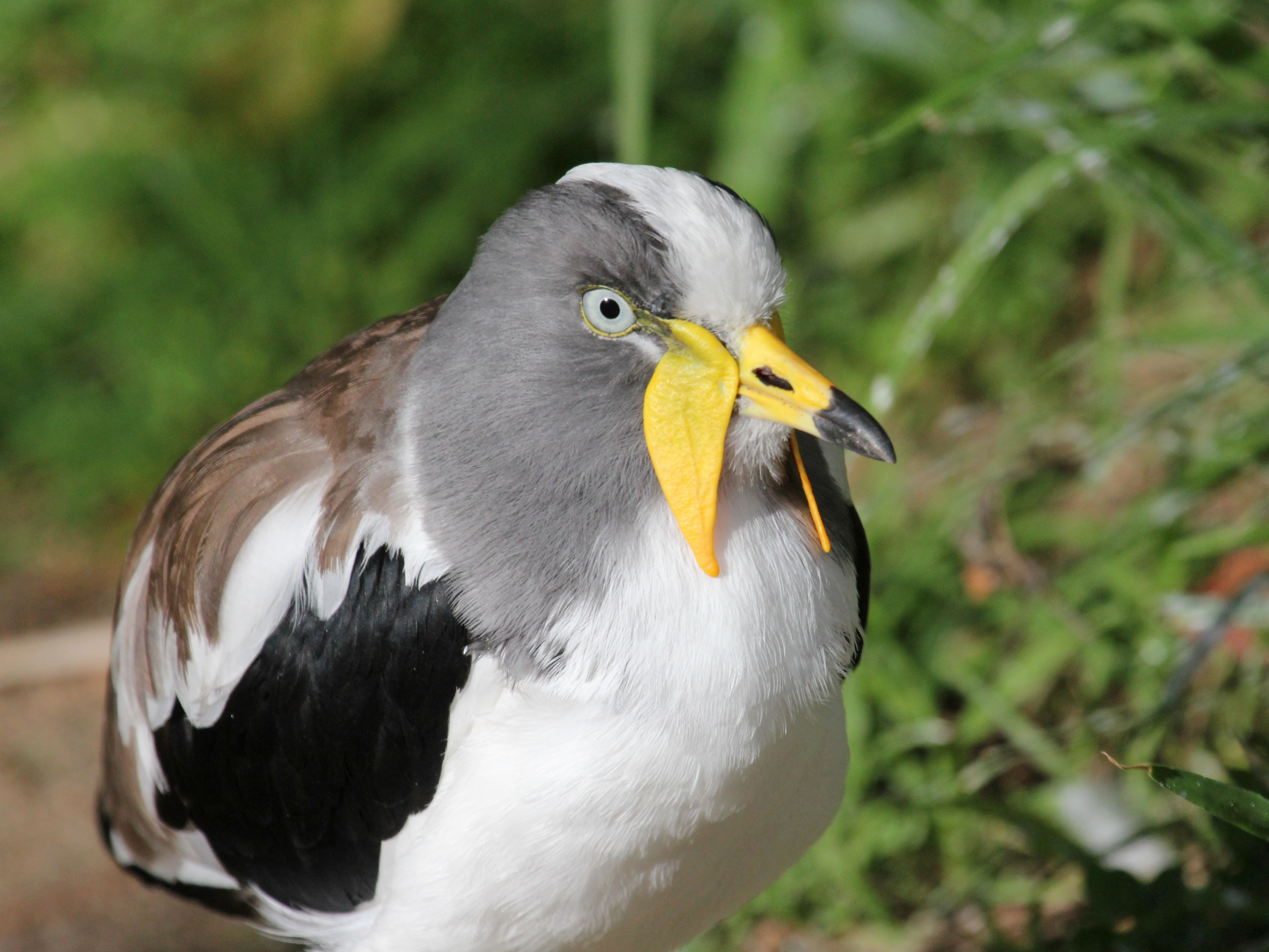
Upper body showing facial wattles

This lapwing is unmistakable. Its wings and tail are strikingly patterned in black and white, the back is brown and the underparts white. The head is particularly striking, being mainly grey, but with a white crown and foreneck. The eyering, facial wattles and legs are yellow. Females, males and young birds are similar in plumage.

== Behaviour ==
It is a wader which breeds on exposed sand or shingle near rivers. 2–3 eggs are laid in a ground scrape. The nest and young are defended noisily and aggressively against all intruders, up to and including the hippopotamus.

Food is mainly insects and other small invertebrates. This species often feeds in small flocks when not breeding.

== Status ==
The white-crowned lapwing is one of the species to which the Agreement on the Conservation of African-Eurasian Migratory Waterbirds (AEWA) applies.
