= Kruger National Park in the 1970s =

Historical Timeline

== 1970 ==
Number of annual visitors to the Kruger National Park: 1970–1979
Year	Total visitors	Year	Total visitors
1969/70	349 710	1970/71	366 381
1971/72	341 232	1972/73	330 565
1973/74	341 232	1974/75	363 482
1975/76	374 892	1976/77	357 473
1977/78	372 488	1978/79	391 512

- January 18 – A Skukuza post office clerk, Marius Meyer, is caught by a crocodile at a Sabie River fishing spot near Skukuza. His remains were never found.
- July 10 – A train hits a herd of buffaloes on the Selati railway line near Bume, killing 19 animals.

== 1971 ==
- January 9 – The new Engelhard Dam near Letaba Rest Camp spills over for the first time.
- February 19 - A Midas free-tailed bat, Tadarida (Mops) midas midas, is caught near Skukuza. This species has not previously been recorded in South Africa.
- May 17 – Black rhinos reintroduced to the Park. Twenty of these animals were released between Skukuza and Pretoriuskop.
- September - An anthrax epidemic breaks out in the northern areas of the Park, nearly wiping out the already small roan antelope population.

== 1972 ==
- January - Tropical cyclone Caroline causes heavy rainfall in the Park.
- 24 February - Olifants Camp was struck by disaster when the main complex, housing the shop and restaurant, was destroyed by a fire thought to have originated in the kitchen chimney.
- March - Another tropical Cyclone, Eugenie, causes more heavy rainfall at the end of the month.
- 21 September - A further twelve black rhinos from the Zambezi valley in Rhodesia arrive in the Park.

== 1973 ==
- March 21 - Paul Kruger Gate near Skukuza opens.
- October 23 – A new frog species, the knocking sand frog, sometimes also known as the sandveld pyxie (Tomopterna krugerensis) is discovered around the Machayi and Mathlakuza Pans in the northeastern part of the Park near the Mozambican frontier.

== 1974 ==
- 1 November - Mooiplaas ranger post, close to the later Mopani rest camp, opens with Bruce Bryden as the first ranger stationed there.

== 1975 ==
- March - Actors Roger Moore and Lee Marvin start location shooting for Shout at the Devil (film) near Letaba Rest Camp.
- October - Actors Elizabeth Taylor and Richard Burton, visit the Kruger Park, just before their re-marriage on Oct. 10, 1975, in Botswana.

== 1976 ==
- February 27 - The last Mozambican recruits cross the border at Pafuri. The northern Kruger National Park was one of the main routes used by the Witwatersrand Native Labour Association (WNLA) to move black recruits from Mozambique to the Witwatersrand gold mines.
- March - The new Frelimo government close the border between Mozambique and the Park, including the Pafuri Border Post.
- March 23 - The South African Police arrests 17 Mozambican soldiers after they crossed the frontier near Nwanetzi. The soldiers were pursuing Portuguese refugees, trying to force them back to Mozambique.
- September 16 - The memorial bust of President Paul Kruger, sculpted by Coert Steynberg, officially unveiled at the Paul Kruger Gate near Skukuza.
- The construction of 234 kilometres of tar roads, started in September 1975, in the northern part of the Park is completed. This is the main road from Letaba Rest Camp to Shingwedzi Rest Camp and the later Pafuri Gate, with a branch westward to Punda Maria Camp and Gate.

== 1977 ==
- February – Cyclone Emilie causes damage to various dams, including the Engelhard and Kanniedood, in the northern region of the Park.

== 1978 ==
- May - Twenty grey rhebok (Pelea capreolus) are relocated from the Golden-Gate Highlands National Park to the Kruger Park. They're released on Khandzalive mountain, northwest of Malelane.
- July – Wolhuter, the first wilderness trail, opens near Malelane in the south of the park.

== 1979 ==
- March 23 - Two children, the daughters of Ranger Willie Nkuna and Sergeant Charlie Nkuna, are killed and eaten by two lions at Phabeni. Both lions are later shot dead.
- May - Five Livingstone's suni antelope (Nesotragus moschatus livingstonianus) are caught at St. Lucia in Natal and relocated to the Kruger Park. They're released at the Matukwale Dam near Punda Maria.
- August 13 - The first sighting of Yellowbilled Oxpeckers Buphagus africanus in the Park was made along the Mphongolo River north of Shingwedzi. The species disappeared from the Transvaal Lowveld soon after the 1896/97 rinderpest epidemic. Before 1979 the closest population occurred in Rhodesia's Gonarezhou National Park, but regular dipping of cattle in the corridor between Gonarezhou and Kruger prevented the migration of the birds to Kruger due to their sensitivity to poisoned ticks. Due to the Rhodesian Bush War, there was a general breakdown of veterinary services in this corridor after 1977 and presumably facilitated the migration of the birds to the Kruger National Park.
- October 22 - The caretaker of the Maroela Caravan Camp near Orpen, Ekson Mathebula, is trampled to death by an elephant on the farm Kempiana outside the Park.
- November – The Olifants Trail opens.

== See also ==
- History of the Kruger National Park
- The Kruger National Park in the 1950s
- The Kruger National Park in the 1960s
- The Kruger National Park in the 1980s
