= Elephant Center =

Elephant Center may refer to:

- Api Elephant Domestication Center (closed), in the Belgian Congo
- Elephant Training Center, Konni, in Kerala, India
- The National Elephant Center (closed), in Fellsmere, Florida, U.S.
- Center for Elephant Conservation, in Polk City, Florida, U.S.

== See also ==
- Project Elephant, a programme in India
- Elephant Hall (disambiguation)
