= Kruger National Park in the 1950s =

This article outlines a timeline of major events occurring within South Africa's Kruger National Park from 1950 to 1959.

== 1950 ==
Number of annual visitors to the Kruger National Park
Year	Total visitors
1950	71 279
1954	91 106
1955	101 058
1956	105 183
1957	117 187
1958	116 849
1959	135 740

- July - A Zambesi shark, Carcharhinus leucas, was caught at the confluence of the Limpopo and Luvuvhu Rivers.
- November 19 - Ranger Nyokane Shilobane shot dead by poachers near Malelane.

== 1953 ==
- November – The construction of Orpen rest camp starts. After completion in 1954, it replaced the old Rabelais rest camp and entrance gate.

== 1954 ==
- October 4 - Prince Bernhard, Prince Consort of Queen Juliana of the Netherlands, visits the Park for three days.

== 1957 ==
- December 10 - Major James Stevenson-Hamilton, warden of the Sabi Game Reserve and the Kruger National Park (1902 - 1946), dies at the age of 90 in White River.

== 1958 ==
- September 22 - Ranger Johannes Maluleke murdered with an axe near Punda Maria. The three poachers responsible were arrested and convicted of murder.

== 1959 ==
- April - Mahlangeni ranger post, situated at the confluence of the Groot Letaba and Klein Letaba Rivers, opens.
- September 28 – An outbreak of anthrax rapidly spreads throughout the area north of the Letaba River. 101 carcasses, mainly kudu, are found and burnt before the epidemic ends in November 1959.

== See also ==
- History of the Kruger National Park
- The Kruger National Park in the 1960s
- The Kruger National Park in the 1970s
- The Kruger National Park in the 1980s
