= Elephant Hall =

Elephant Hall may refer to:

- Elephant Hall (Nebraska) in the University of Nebraska State Museum in Lincoln, Nebraska, United States
- Elephant Hall (Letaba Rest Camp) a museum in Kruger National Park, South Africa

== See also ==
- Elephant Center (disambiguation)
