= Pierre Offerman =

Pierre-Paul-Marie Offermann
- Born: March 26, 1897; Schaerbeek, Province of Brabant, Belgium
- Died: February 2, 1970 (aged 72); Brussels, Province of Brabant, Belgium
- Military career
- Allegiance: Belgium; Congo
- Branch: Army
- Rank: Lieutenant colonel
- Unit: Cavalry

Pierre-Paul-Marie Offermann (26 March 1897 – 2 February 1970) was the commandant of the Gangala-na-bodio elephant domestication center and chief warden of the conservation service of the Belgian Congo, the Service des Eaux et Forêts, Chasse et Pêche.

== Biography ==
Pierre Offermann was born on 26 March 1897 in Schaerbeek, Province of Brabant, Belgium. At the age of 16, he volunteered for the 1st Regiment of Guides and later fought in the First World War.

In June 1923, Offermann was assigned to the Force Publique and posted to the headquarters in Stanleyville. In 1927, he was tasked with establishing an elephant domestication center in Orientale Province. The new center was opened under the name of Gangala-na-Bodio Elephant Domestication Center and Offermann became its commandant. He also played a significant role in the establishment of Garamba National Park and became its first warden in 1938.

During the Second World War, Offerman was summoned to London, where he served as an advisor to the Minister of Colonies, Albert de Vleeschauwer, and was promoted to lieutenant colonel. After the war, he returned to Congo.

He retired in 1953 and moved back to Belgium. He died in Brussels on 2 February 1970.
