= Kruger National Park in the 1980s =

This article outlines a timeline of major events occurring within South Africa's Kruger National Park from 1980 to 1989.

== 1980 ==
Number of annual visitors to the Kruger National Park: 1980–1990
Year	Total visitors
1979/1980	369 653
1980/1981	428 840
1981/1982	463 853
1983/1984	451 780
1984/1985	509 173
1989/1990	669 167

- August – The Nyalaland Trail opens near Punda Maria in the far north of the Park.

== 1981 ==
- April 21 – A research team collects specimens of the African lungfish Protopterus annectens brieni Poll in a small pan in the Pumbe sandveld on the border with Mozambique. This is the first record of this species in the Park as well as the Republic of South Africa.
- November 4 - A Cessna 421, operated by Gold Fields Aviation, with six people onboard crash-landed soon after take-off from Skukuza Airport. The pilot tried to make an emergency landing on the Skukuza-Paul Kruger Gate road, but the right wing struck a tree and then another tree hit the nose penetrating the instrument panel, killing the pilot. The plane came to rest 51 metres from the first tree impact after ploughing through undergrowth.

== 1982 ==
- January 17 - An employee, Louis Mathye, is killed by a lion near Punda Maria Camp. Ranger Louis Olivier shoots the lion dead on top of the body.
- December 7 - A new game ranger post, Woodlands, is opened with Ranger Johan Oelofse as the first ranger. Woodlands is near the present Bateleur Camp.

== 1983 ==
- August - The Bushman Trail opens.

== 1984 ==
- February 24 - Berg-en-Dal rest camp officially opens.

== 1985 ==
- July 1 - Pafuri Gate opens.
- July - Lichtenstein's hartebeest reintroduced to the park.
- September 17 - Boulders Camp, near the later Mopani Camp, opens.

== 1988 ==
- July 11 - The Gonde-Gonde incident: a park vehicle detonated a landmine a few kilometres south of Pafuri. No one was hurt.

== See also ==
- History of the Kruger National Park
- The Kruger National Park in the 1950s
- The Kruger National Park in the 1960s
- The Kruger National Park in the 1970s
