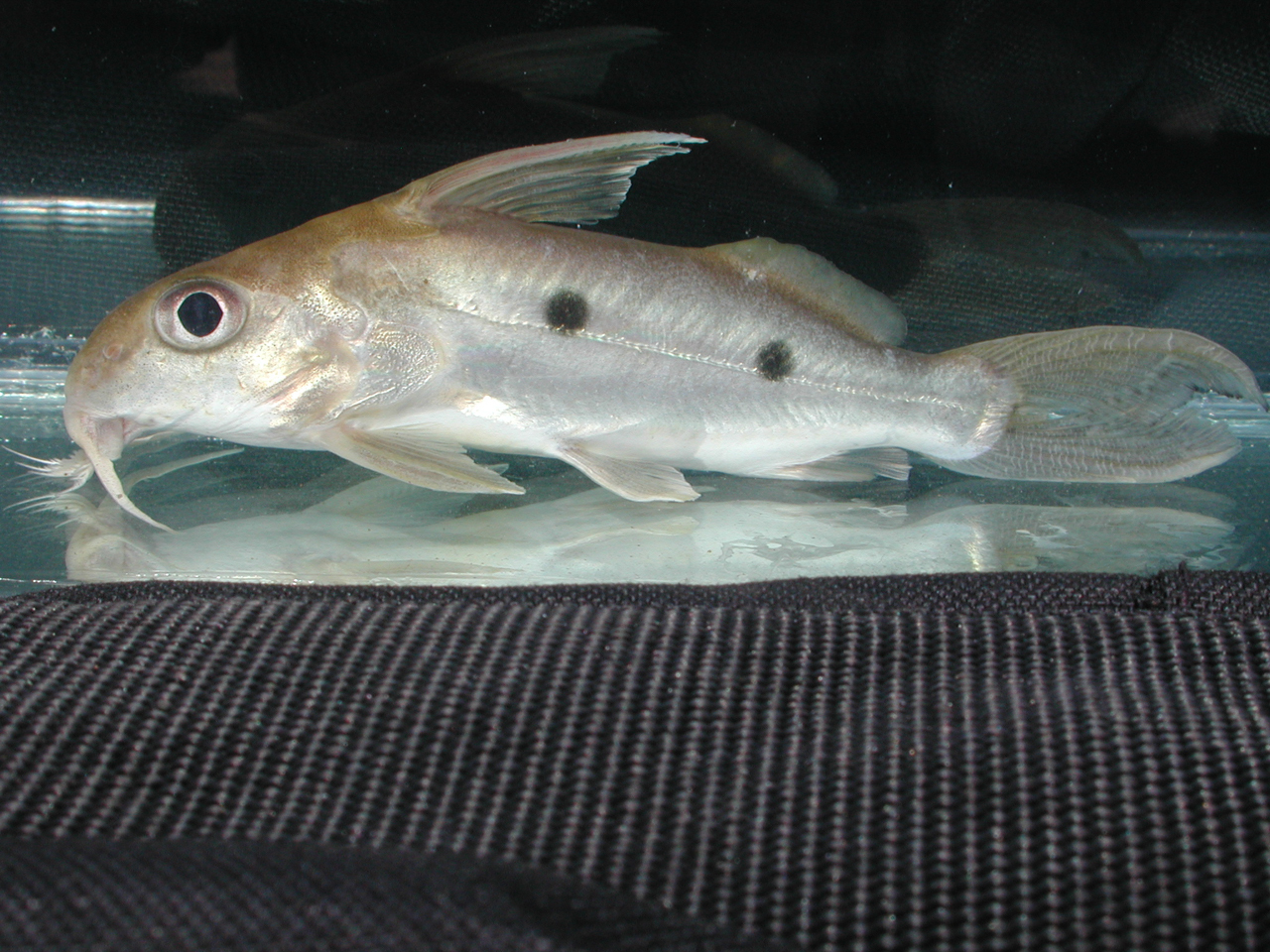

Conservation status
- Least Concern (IUCN 3.1)

Scientific classification
- Domain: Eukaryota
- Kingdom: Animalia
- Phylum: Chordata
- Class: Actinopterygii
- Order: Siluriformes
- Family: Mochokidae
- Genus: Synodontis
- Species: S. congicus

Binomial name
- Synodontis congicus Poll, 1971

= Synodontis congicus =

Species of fish

Synodontis congicus is a species of upside-down catfish native to the Democratic Republic of the Congo and the Republic of the Congo where it occurs in the upper and middle Congo Basin. It was first described by Belgian ichthyologist Max Poll in 1971. The first specimen was found near the town of Gangala-na-Bodio, Democratic Republic of the Congo, in the Dungu River. The meaning of the specific name "congicus" is "From the Congo".

== Description ==
The fish is light grey to silver in color, with one to four spots along the midlateral line of the body.

Like other members of the genus, this fish has a humeral process, which is a bony spike that is attached to a hardened head cap on the fish and can be seen extending beyond the gill opening. The first ray of the dorsal fin and the pectoral fins have a hardened first ray which is serrated. The caudal fin is deeply forked with an extension on the top lobe. It has short, cone-shaped teeth in the upper jaw. In the lower jaw, the teeth are s-shaped and movable. The fish has one pair of short maxillary barbels, and two pairs of mandibular barbels that are often branched.

This species grows to a length of 16 centimetres (6.3 in) SL although specimens up to 20.2 centimetres (8.0 in) TL have been recorded in nature.

In the wild, the species inhabits tropical waters with a temperature range of 22 to 25 °C (72 to 77 °F), a pH of 6.2 – 7.2, and dH range of 5-15. It is found in the Kinsuka rapids in the Lower Congo basin, upstream to the upper Congo basin, excluding the Luapula River and Lake Mweru.
