= Kruger National Park in the 1960s =

== 1960 ==
Number of annual visitors to the Kruger National Park: 1960–1969
Year	Total visitors
1960	137 113
1961	152 465
1962	153 871
1963	180 044
1964	220 569
1965	255 398
1968	306 346

- 3 June - Phalaborwa Gate officially opens, replacing Malopene Gate.
- 3 June – Olifants Rest Camp officially opens. It replaces the 'old' Olifants Rest Camp, which is renamed Balule.
- 5 June – An outbreak of anthrax rapidly spreads throughout the area north of the Letaba River. 1,054 carcasses are found and burnt before the epidemic ends in October 1960.
- 24 September - The Hungarian-born composer Mátyás Seiber dies in a vehicle accident in the Park. Four other people in the vehicle survive the accident.

== 1961 ==
- 20 April – Warden Steyn retires. He is replaced by the chief biologist, A. M. Brynard, who takes the new title of Nature Conservator.
- 14 October – White rhinos re-introduced to the Park. The first batch of 4 that arrives from Natal are released in a special enclosure near Pretoriuskop.
- October - The Stevenson-Hamilton Memorial Library in Skukuza opens.

== 1962 ==
- 9-12 April – The first comprehensive aerial census of elephants yields a total of 1,601, mainly north of the Olifants River.

== 1964 ==
- 25 May - Due to a severe drought that started in 1962, a campaign to cull 100 Letaba River hippos starts. This campaign ends in August 1964.
- 21 November - After the successful reintroduction of white rhinos in 1961, the first new calf is born near Pretoriuskop.

== 1965 ==
- 30 November - A symposium, attended by many South African biologists, is convened in Pretoria by the National Parks Board on the "over-protection" of nature. Acting on recommendations emanating from this conference, the National Parks Board decides in March 1966 to commence with the culling of seven species (elephant, buffalo, hippo, giraffe, zebra, wildebeest and impala).
- 15 December - Liquor sales started in all rest camps (except Orpen, Malelane and Crocodile Bridge), ending a near 40-year prohibition.

== 1966 ==
- January - Tropical cyclone Claude causes heave rainfall in the Park. Although extensive damage occurs in neighbouring Mozambique, there's very little damage in the Park itself.

== 1967 ==
- 4 March – Ranger D. Swart reports seeing a group of 6 bat-eared foxes (Otocyon megalotis) near Shingwedzi. Previously thought to occur only in the more arid regions of western Southern Africa, this is the first sighting of these animals in the Park. Further sightings in June 1967 and early 1969 confirm that bat-eared foxes do indeed occur in the Park.

== 1968 ==
- 1 January – Two trains collide near Randspruit between Skukuza and Crocodile Bridge in the worst train disaster in the park. Fourteen people die and 38 are seriously injured.
- 18 December - Sixteen cheetahs are relocated to Tshokwane in the Park from South West Africa (now Namibia).They were exchanged with surplus zebras from Kruger Park. A further group of eight is released near Crocodile Bridge on 9 February 1969.
- December – A game-driving operation, Operation Numbi, starts in order to remove animals from a 6000 hectare excised section of the Park north of Numbi Gate. This area of the Park, around Numbi Kop, was exchanged for other areas due to the rerouting of the Selati railway line which ran through the Park.

== 1969 ==
- 1 February – Commercial Airlines (Comair) starts the first scheduled flights from Johannesburg and Phalaborwa to Skukuza with a DC3 aircraft.
- The construction of the tar road from Lower Sabie to Crocodile Bridge is completed.

== See also ==
- History of the Kruger National Park
- The Kruger National Park in the 1950s
- The Kruger National Park in the 1970s
- The Kruger National Park in the 1980s
