= Sabi Sabi =

Private game reserve in South Africa

Coordinates: 24°56′44″S 31°28′13″E

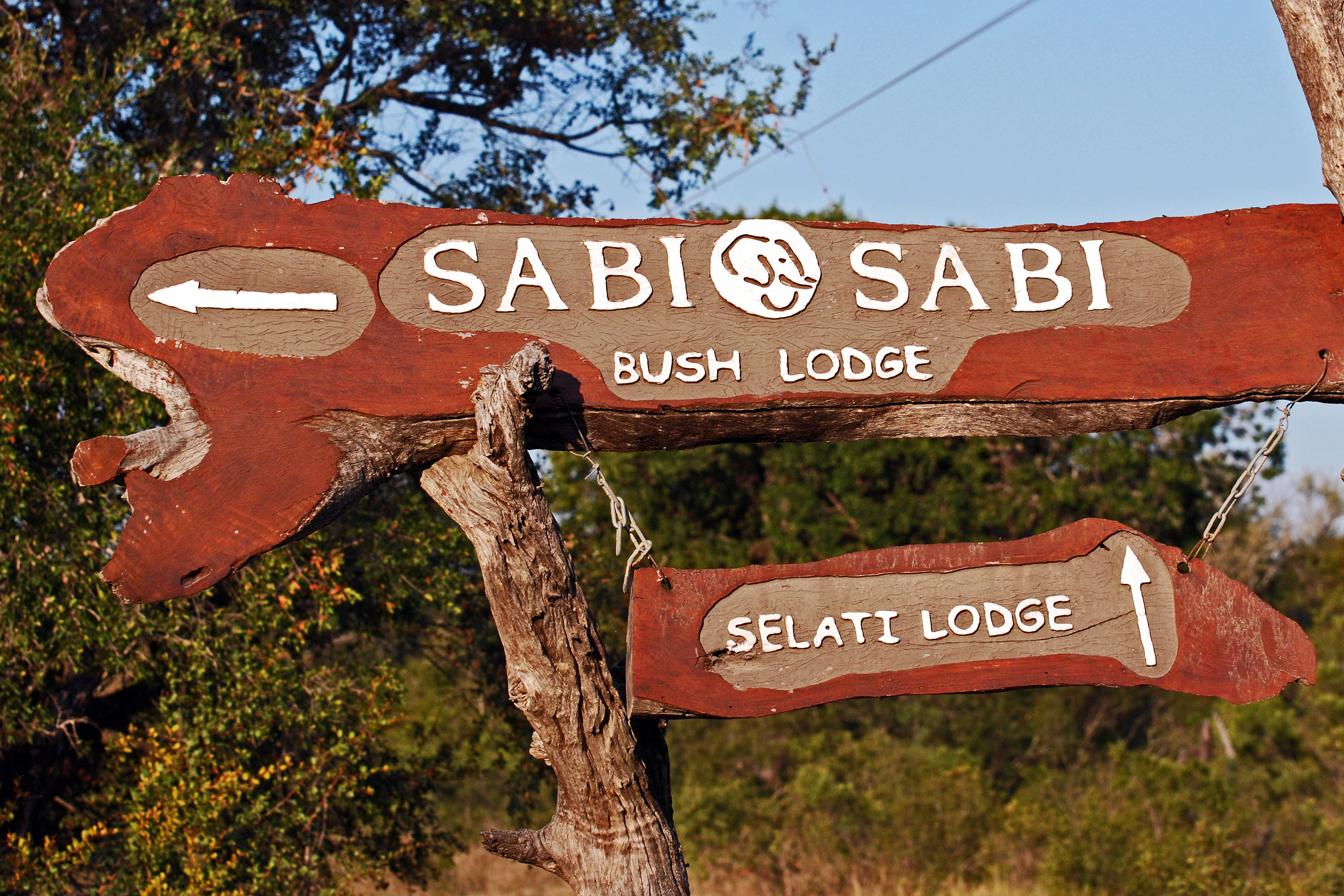

Sabi Sabi is a private game reserve in South Africa, situated in the Sabi Sand Game Reserve which flanks the south western section of the Kruger National Park. The Sabi Sand Reserve is one of the parks that make up the Greater Kruger National Park.

It is a conservation area where the big five game (lion, leopard, rhinoceros, buffalo, elephant) occur naturally.

== Wildlife ==
Views from the deck of the Sabi Sabi Lodge

Wildlife present include Southern African wildcat, black-backed jackal, blue wildebeest, Burchell's zebra, Cape buffalo, chacma baboon, civet, common duiker, African bush elephant, South African giraffe, hippopotamus, impala, kudu, large-spotted genet, African leopard, cheetah, lion, reedbuck, scrub hare, side-striped jackal, slender mongoose, spotted hyena, steenbok, tree squirrel, vervet monkey, warthog, waterbuck, southern white rhinoceros, white-tailed mongoose and Cape wild dog. Also seen here are a variety of birds including saddle-billed storks, vultures, cattle egrets and brown-headed parrots, as well as several species of reptile and invertebrates.

== See also ==
- Lower Sabie
- Wildlife of South Africa
