= Lower Sabie =

Rest camp in Kruger National Park, South Africa

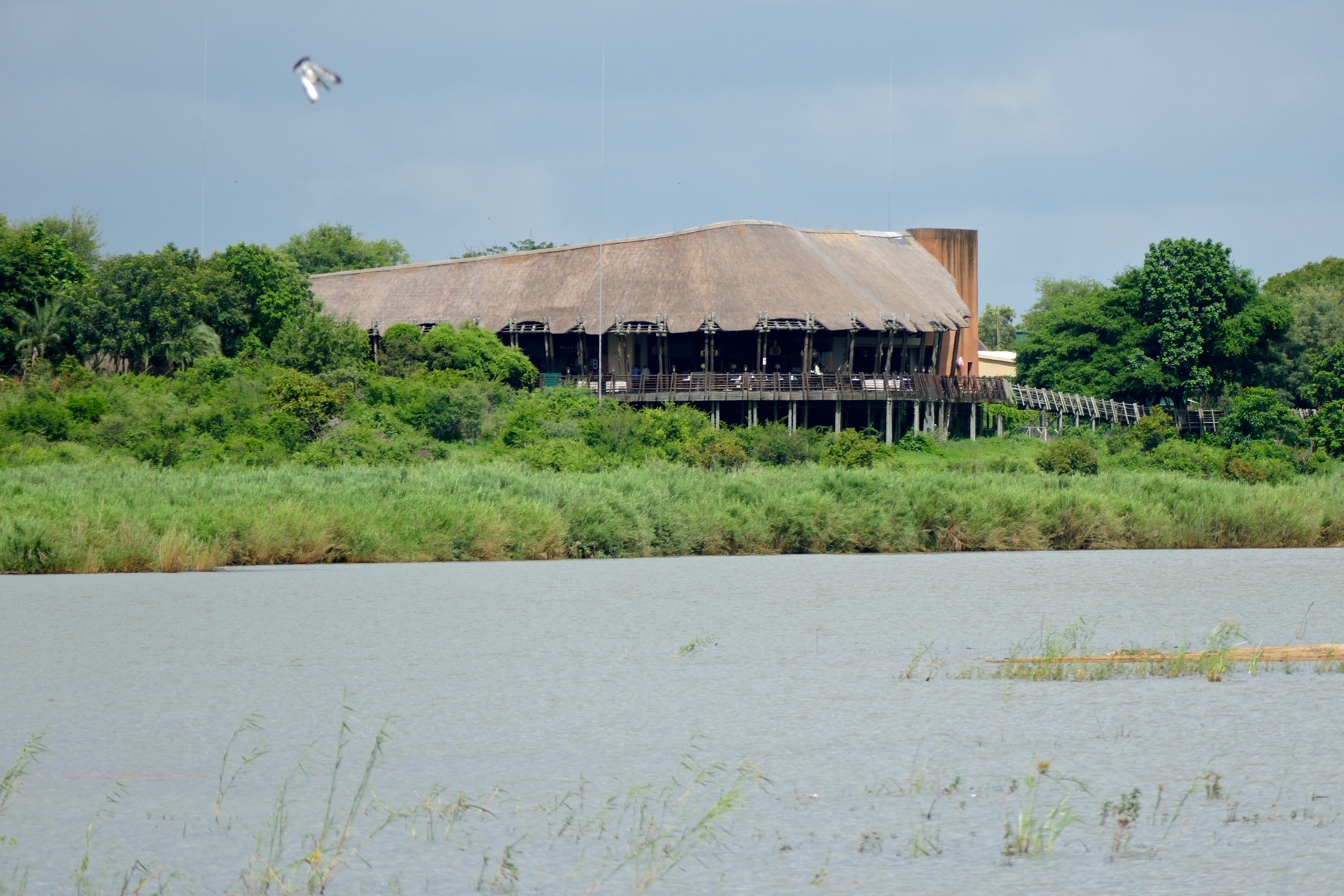
- View of the Lower Sabie restaurant seen from across the Sabie River
- Interactive map of Lower Sabie
- Location: South bank of Sabie River, southeastern Kruger Park
- Coordinates: 25°07′11″S 31°54′54″E
- Elevation: 174 m (571 ft)
- Campsites: 33 tent or caravan sites; 24 furnished 2-bed tents on stilts
- Residences: 30 huts (1-5 beds); 58 two-bed bungalows; 2 three-bed bungalows; 2 five-bed bungalows; 1 six-bed luxury guest house
- Restaurants: Mugg & Bean
- Facilities: communal ablutions and cooking facilities for campsites and huts; Swimming pool; Laundromat; Petrol station; Internet cafe
- Operated by: South African National Parks
- Established: 1930s
- Website: www.sanparks.org/parks/kruger/camps/lower_sabie/

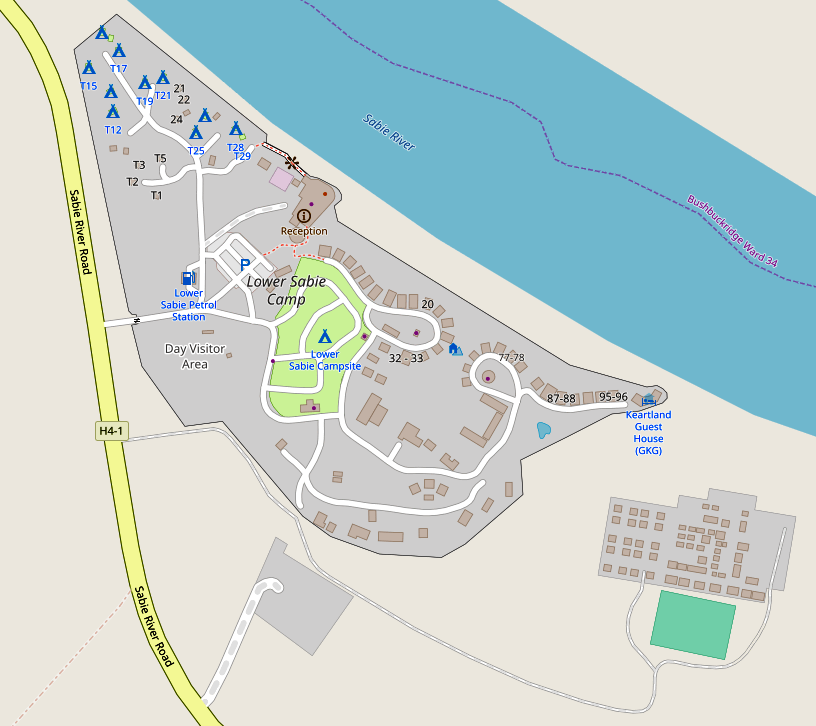
Map of the Lower Sabie camp

Lower Sabie is one of Kruger National Park's main rest camps and is situated on the southern bank of the Sabie River, in the southeastern section of the park. It is connected to the main Skukuza camp by the H4-1 tarred road (43 km (27 miles) apart), which is often considered to be the busiest road in the whole park.

== History ==
When the Sabie Game Reserve was first proclaimed in 1898, the area around where Lower Sabie now lies was undeveloped. The initial road to the area was a two-track gravel road running up from Crocodile Bridge and continuing to Skukuza, built in 1926 and 1927 after the park was re-established as the Kruger National Park. The Gomondwane Road (H4-2) and the Mativuhlungu Loop (S82) roughly follow this route today. In 1930, the quarters of ranger Tom Duke were converted into a five-bedroom wood-and-steel guest house, made available to tourists. Between 1928 and 1931, the Sabie River Road (H4-1) was built between Skukuza and the site of what is now Lower Sabie. This guest house was a financial failure and was demolished in 1932. A set of 3 six-bedroom units was built to replace the guest house and provide accommodation in this region of the park. In 1935 a portion of a £50,000 grant was used to expand Lower Sabie to accommodate 200 visitors, which included retrofitting the old huts to be made mosquito-proof. The first camp supervisor was appointed in 1936.

== Facilities ==
As with all major rest camps in Kruger, Lower Sabie provides a park shop, restaurant, braai area and communal kitchen facilities, a first aid station, laundromat, and fuel filling station.

=== General facilities ===
Lower Sabie has a single restaurant, franchised by Mugg & Bean. The restaurant has a large seating area overlooking the river and is often the location of game sightings. Near the restaurant is a shop, which sells reference books, maps, food and drinks (including beer, wine and spirits), as well as a variety of clothing, collectables, and curios.

Other general facilities include:

- Swimming pool
- Laundromat
- Public telephone, as well as cell phone reception
- Filling station

=== Day visitor area ===
Lower Sabie has a designated day visitor area with picnic sites and a swimming pool.

=== Nearby facilities ===
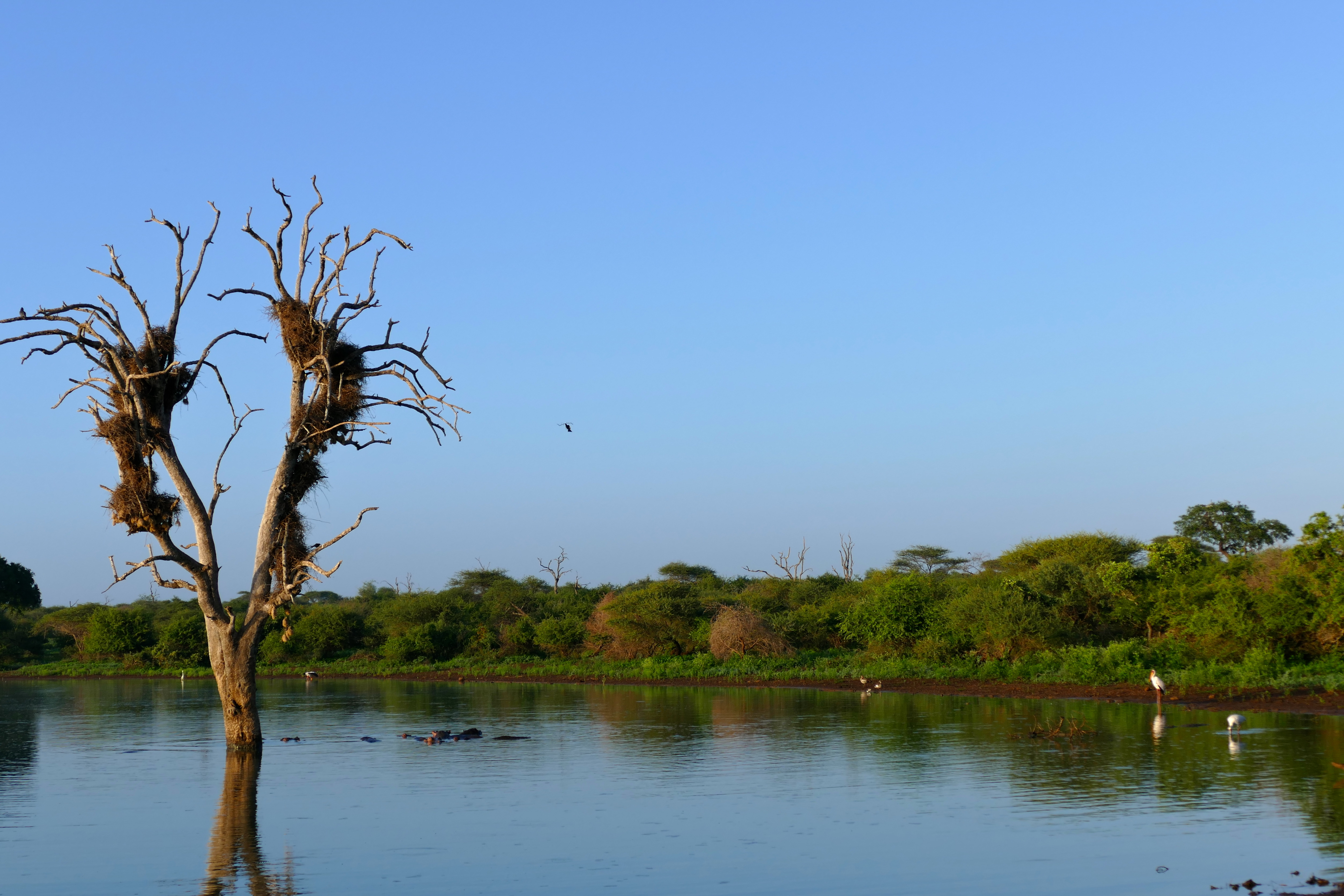
Sunset dam, situated just west outside the camp

Near to the camp, but outside of its gates, are the picnic areas at Nkuhlu (± 20 km (12 miles)), Mlondozi Dam (17 km (11 mi)) and Tshokwane (43 km (27 miles)). Sunset dam is a 1 km drive from the camp and often features large numbers of animals in the morning and evening. Nthandanyati Bird Hide is about 11 km from camp.

== Accommodation ==
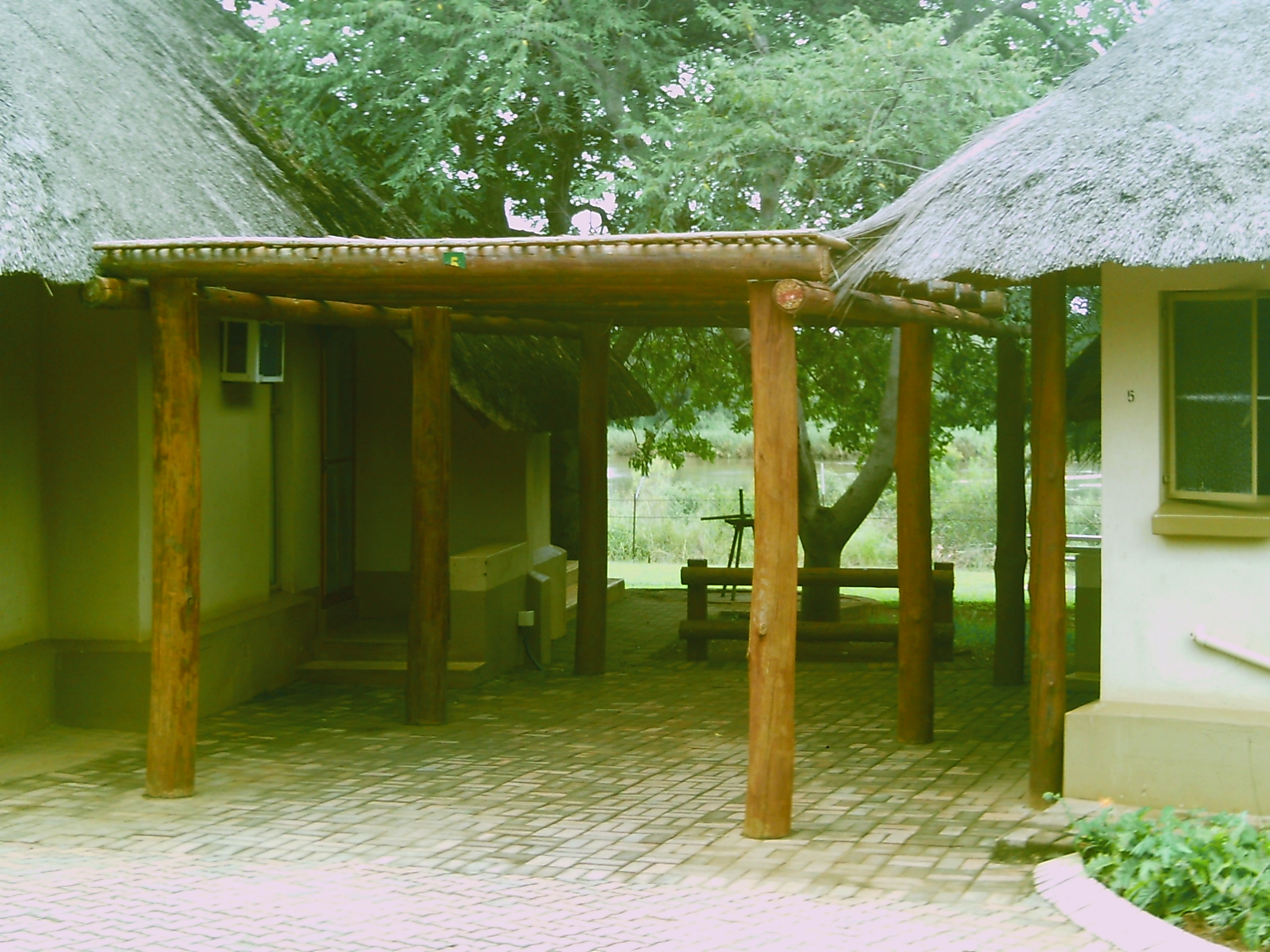
Shady verandas and car parking between two bungalows in Lower Sabie

Accommodation is available on a self-catering basis, in 30 huts and 62 bungalows, as well as one large guest house. Last, but not least, for visitors wanting to enjoy the outdoor, there are camping sites for 33 caravans or tents, all equipped with electrical power. The camp also has 25 fully-equipped safari tents, giving it an African bush feeling. The camp is laid out on the Sabie River banks, visitors can be seated on the restaurant's wooden deck, having a cold beer and viewing the plenty game wandering in the river bed below.

== Activities ==
Guided bush walks, game drives, breakfasts in the wild, and the Kruger Park "Bush Braai" (a barbecue-style dinner) are all available, departing from Lower Sabie, but are subject to availability.

=== Game viewing ===
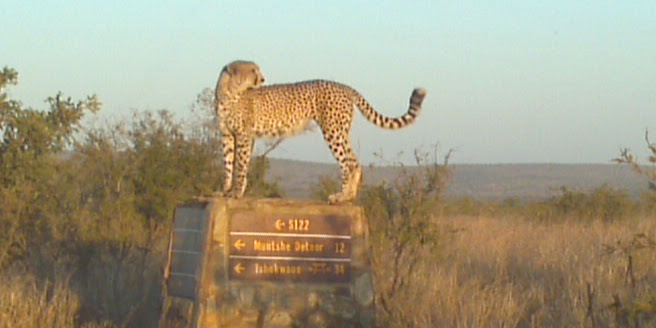
A male cheetah perched on a road sign near Lower Sabie

Lower Sabie is within the range of all of the big five game animals. Genet, serval, cheetah and porcupine also frequent the area. Hippos are often visible on the river banks, even from inside the camp.

=== Bird viewing ===
Kingfishers, storks and cormorants are often visible from the restaurant deck, which overlooks the river. Southern masked weavers, bulbuls, Cape glossy starlings, Natal spurfowl and several types of hornbill can often be seen within the camp. Ntandanyathi Bird Hide is about 12 km southeast of the camp and offers good viewing, including marabou and black storks.

== See also ==
- Letaba Rest Camp
- Sabi Sand Game Reserve
  - Sabi Sabi
- Shingwedzi Rest Camp
- Skukuza Rest Camp
