= Gangala-na-Bodio Elephant Domestication Center =

Elephant domestication station in the Democratic Republic of the Congo

Gangala-na-Bodio Elephant Domestication Center Centre de domestication des éléphants de Gangala-na-Bodio
- IUCN category VI (protected area with sustainable use of natural resources)
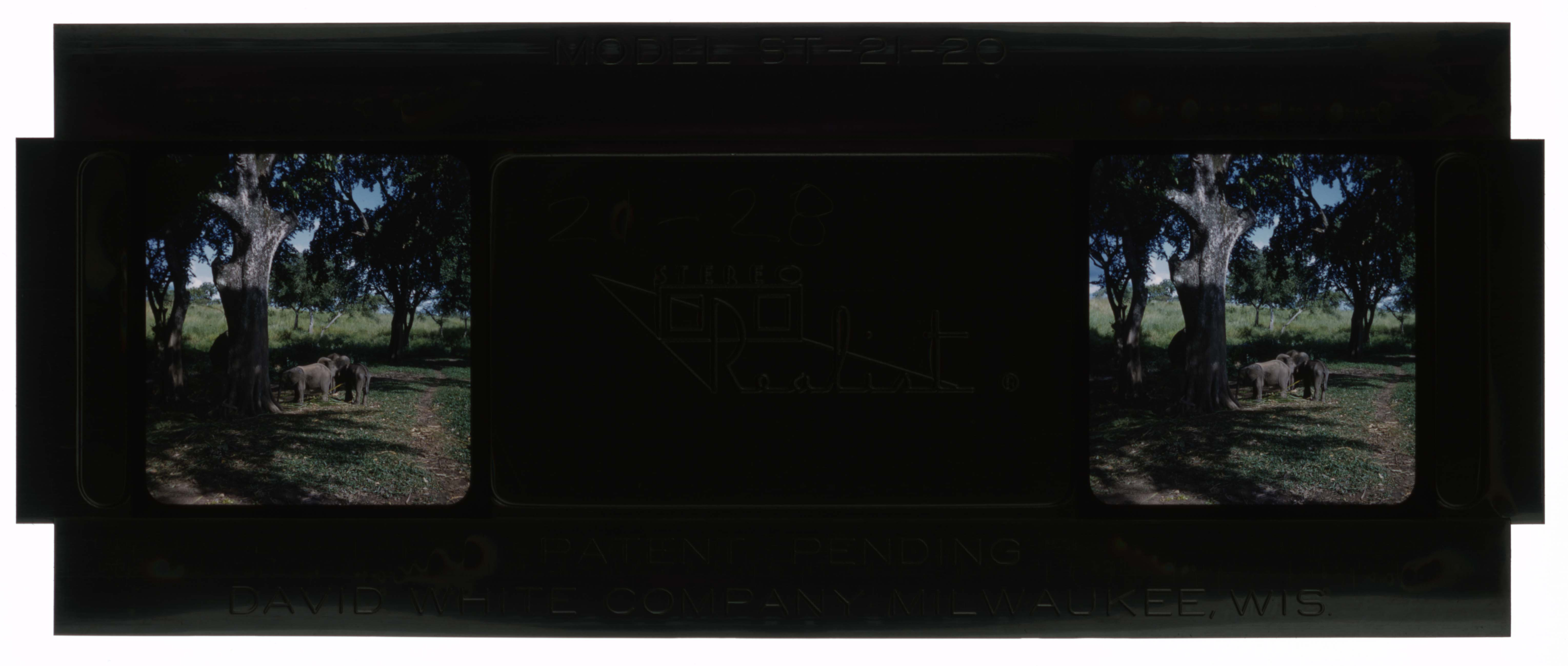
- 1955 stereoscopic image of the camp

- Location within Democratic Republic of the Congo
- Location: northeastern Democratic Republic of the Congo
- Nearest city: Dungu
- Coordinates: 3.67998°N 29.13488°E
- Area: 9,829.32 km^{2} (3,795.12 sq mi)
- Established: 1974

Gangala-na-Bodio (French: Centre de domestication des éléphants de Gangala-na-Bodio) was a colonial-era elephant-domestication station located in Gangala-na-Bodio, near Faradje in present-day Democratic Republic of the Congo. The Belgian project at Kira Vunga, Api and Gangala was the first attempt to domesticate African elephants for work. Pierre Offerman was instrumental in setting up the station.

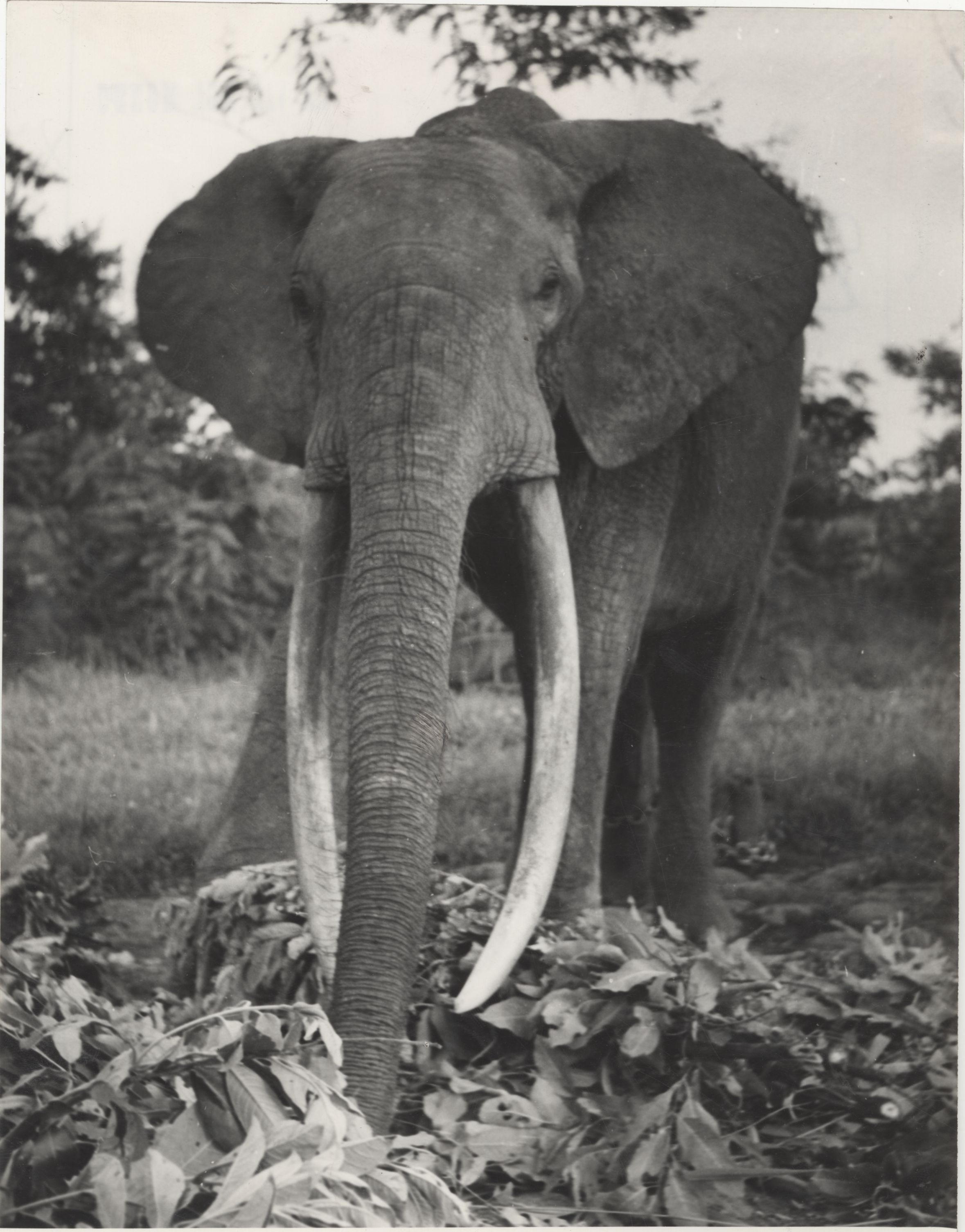
The biggest elephant living in the Elephants' Domestication Center of Gangala na Bodio - 1958, Touring Club Italiano
