= Api Elephant Domestication Center =

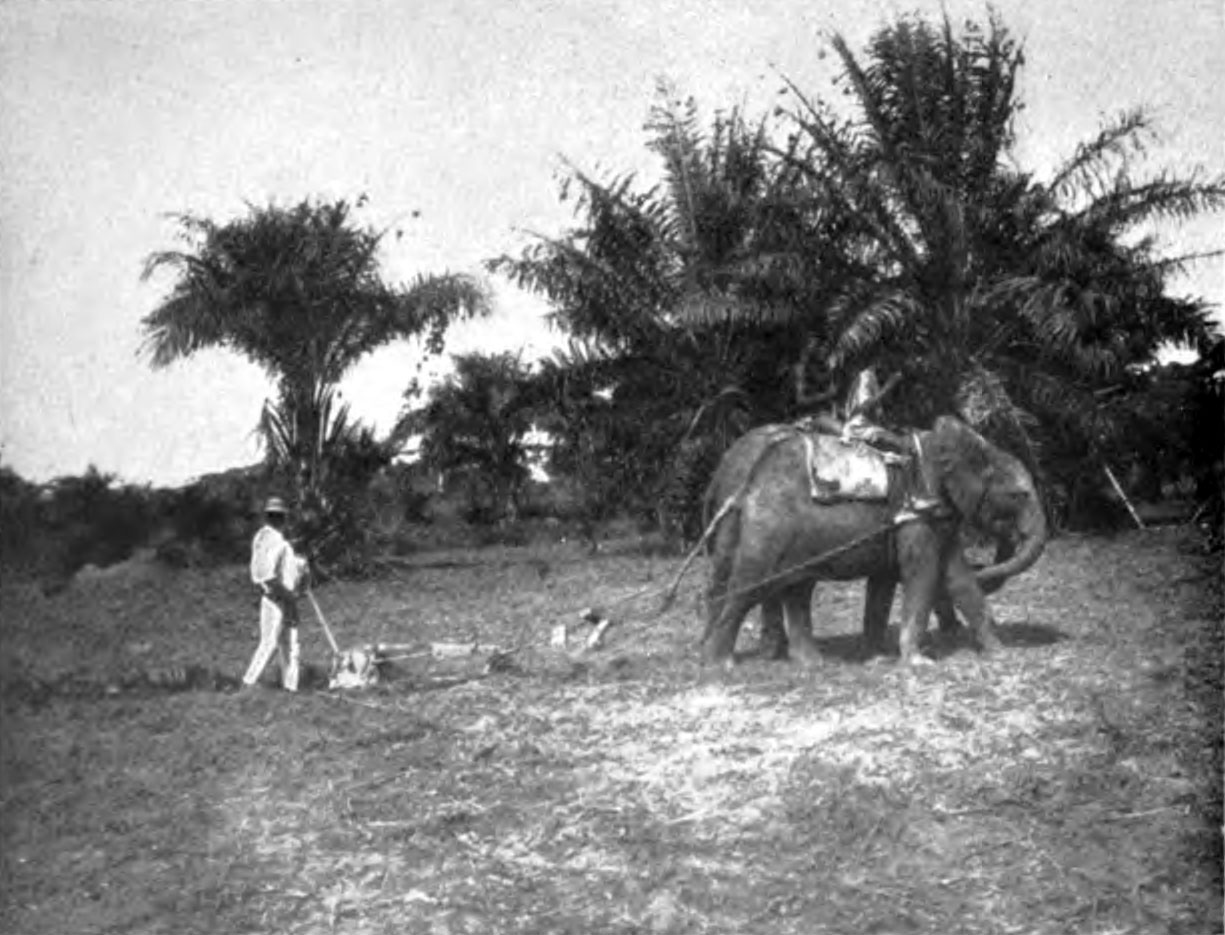

- Location within Democratic Republic of the Congo
- Location: northeastern Democratic Republic of the Congo
- Nearest city: Dungu
- Coordinates: 3.70569°N 25.39592°E
- Established: 1925

The Api Elephant Domestication Center was a project of the Belgian Congo to tame African elephants. It was a continuation of the domestication project at Kira Vunga, which was the first attempt to harness this species for human work.

== History ==
The project to tame elephants was initiated by decree of King Leopold. The Center at Kira Vunga was opened in 1899. The first animals were trained in 1902 under the direction of Commandant Jules Laplume, a Belgian cavalry officer. The first World War put the operation on hold, and Laplume was captured by German forces, returning to Congo in 1918. The work was transferred to Api in 1925.

After initially failing to capture any animals, as many as ten elephants were successfully captured and living in captivity by 1910.

Taming operations were partly shifted to Gangala-na-Bodio in 1930 and the camp at Api closed in 1932.

In 1987 elephant training was restarted again at Api.

== Domestication purpose ==
The initiative to use elephants for work is said to have been inspired by reports that an orphaned elephant calf had been partly tamed by missionaries in the Congo. Elephants promised to provide not only tsetse-resistant draft animals, they were also estimated to be ten to twenty times as strong as oxen.
