= Crocodile Bridge =

Rest camp and gate to Kruger National Park, South Africa

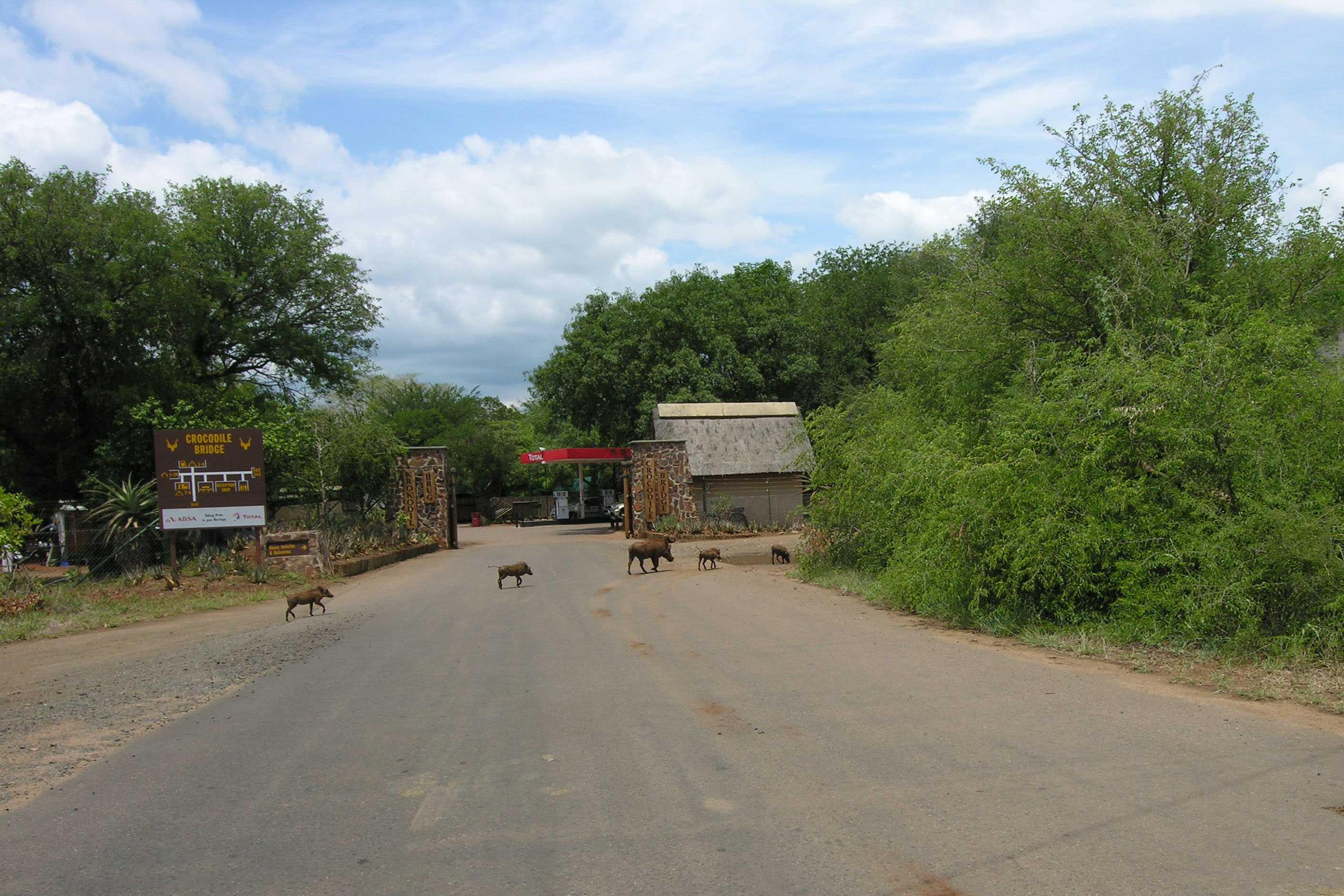
- View of the gate to the Crocodile Bridge camp
- Interactive map of Crocodile Bridge
- Location: Northwest bank of the Crocodile River, along the southern border of Kruger National Park
- Coordinates: 25.35848°S 31.89263°E
- Elevation: 160 m (520 ft)
- Campsites: 18 tent or caravan sites; 8 furnished 2-bed tents
- Residences: 20 two-bed bungalows
- Restaurants: take-away food section at shop
- Facilities: communal ablutions and cooking facilities for campsites and huts; Laundromat; Petrol station; Mobile phone reception
- Water: drinkable
- Operated by: South African National Parks
- Website: www.sanparks.org/parks/kruger/camps/croc_bridge/

Crocodile Bridge is the name of both a camp along the southern border of Kruger National Park and a gate to the park in Mpumalanga Province of South Africa. The gate is at a low water bridge crossing the Crocodile River and leads directly to the Crocodile Bridge rest camp. The park entry, including payment, is adjacent to the camp itself.

== Facilities ==
As with all major rest camps in Kruger, Crocodile Bridge provides a shop, braai and communal kitchen facilities, a first aid station, a laundromat, and a filling station.

=== Food facilities ===
As one of Kruger's smaller camps, Crocodile Bridge does not have a full restaurant. Instead, a take-away food section is provided within the shop, with some permanent tables and chairs placed outside to enjoy the food by.

=== Nearby facilities ===
Crocodile Bridge is a 15-minute (12 km) drive from the town of Komatipoort, which lies at the confluence of the Crocodile and Komati Rivers and along the border with Mozambique. Trips to town must be done during the day, as the park's gates still close at the usual times.

== Accommodation ==
Crocodile Bridge camp provides accommodation to 208 visitors in 45 units: 20 two-or-three-bed cottages with en-suite bathrooms and 8 two-bed permanent furnished canvas tents including fans and fridges, but with communal ablutions and hot showers. 18 tent or caravan sites with electricity and braai locations are also available.

== Activities ==
=== Game viewing ===
Crocodile Bridge is in the Southern Circle game viewing area, which is known for several prides of lion, each with different hunting techniques and behaviour.

=== Night game drives ===
Because of the proximity of the camp to the entrance gate, Crocodile Bridge is the only camp of the Kruger Park to offer guided game drives to outside visitors at night. Patrons staying over at Ngwenya Lodge, Marloth Park outside Kruger or B&B's in Komatipoort are welcomed to use this opportunity.

== History ==
The road bridge at Crocodile Bridge was originally created as a pontoon crossing to allow ranger access to the park from Komatipoort. In the 1920s, a road was added connecting Crocodile Bridge to what is now the Lower Sabie rest camp. In 1927, the board of the park asked South African Railways to connect the Selati Railway across the Crocodile River. While the old railway bridge is in a state of disrepair, it is presently used as a water extraction point for farm irrigation, and can still be seen from the rest camp. A road was also built from Crocodile Bridge to Skukuza, passing by what is now Lower Sabie. In 1931, eight rondavels were built at Crocodile Bridge, marking the first time it was used as both a gate to the park and a rest camp. In 1935, several Knapp-huts were erected. These were square buildings with corrugated steel roof and cement blocks. This was widely unpopular as the huts were considered unsightly, so only a small number were ever built. In 1931, a Pegasus Petroleum filling station was built at Crocodile Bridge. The original road crossing was upgraded to a causeway in 1945, ending usage of the last pontoon in the park.

== See also ==
- Skukuza Restcamp
- Lower Sabie Restcamp
