= History of Kruger National Park =

The Kruger National Park is a South African National Park and one of the largest game reserves in Africa. Originally known as The Sabi Game Reserve, it became a game reserve in 1898. The park became known as Kruger National Park in 1926, when it was named after Paul Kruger.

== The Sabi Game Reserve: 1898–1913 ==
In 1898, the Sabi Game Reserve was proclaimed by the South African Republic. The reserve covered an area of 1,210,000 morgen equivalent to 10,364 km^{2} (4,002 mi^{2}). Before any effective management could take over, the South African War broke out the following year. After the occupation of the Transvaal by British forces, Captain H. F. Francis was appointed as the first Warden of the Sabi Game Reserve in 1901. However, he was killed in action a month later, at the end of July 1901. A former prospector, W. M. Walker, was then appointed as the second Warden on 24 October 1901. He was dismissed at the end of January 1902 after proving to be a dismal failure in the post. Finally, the new British administration appointed James Stevenson-Hamilton as Warden of the reserve in July 1902. To assist him in his duties, the new Warden started appointing the first game rangers. Each one was given the responsibility of a section of the reserve. Captain E. G. (Gaza) Gray and Rupert Atmore only lasted for a few months and they were replaced with Harry Wolhuter (August 1902) and Thomas Duke (December 1902). They were stationed, respectively, at Pretoriuskop and Lower Sabie. In May 1903 Cecil Richard de Laporte was appointed to the Kaapmuiden post. Shingwedzi Game Reserve, now in northern Kruger National Park, was proclaimed in May 1903. Apart from Stevenson-Hamilton's duties as Warden of the Sabi Game Reserve, this new reserve's administration was also added to his responsibilities. He visited and explored the Shingwedzi Reserve for the first time during September and October 1903. He appointed Major A. A. Fraser as the first ranger for this new reserve in 1904. The eccentric Fraser was stationed at the Malunzane rangers post, not far from the present Mopani rest camp.

Proclamation No. 31 of 1906 restricted hunting in a large area between the Olifants and Letaba rivers.

In May 1905 the Sabi Reserve had almost 3,000 black residents, and in 1911 Stevenson-Hamilton reported that there were 4,100 people living in the Sabi Reserve.

== The Sabi Game Reserve: 1914–1926 ==
Estimate Wildlife Population for 1918
Species	Estimate	Species	Estimate
African buffalo	250	Elephant	65
Black rhinoceros	6	White rhinoceros	None
Burchell's zebra	3,500	Bushbuck	4,000
Sable antelope	3,500	Impala	6,800
Giraffe	210	Greater kudu	3,000
Hippopotamus	195	Klipspringer	4,500
Roan antelope	800	Common tsessebe	1,000
Blue wildebeest	5,000	Waterbuck	6,500

In 1916 the Administrator of the Transvaal appointed a commission to inquire into and report upon the advisability of altering the boundaries of the Sabi and Shingwedzi game reserves and on matters generally affecting the two reserves. The members of the commission visited the Sabi game reserve during the dry season of 1916. The commission sat at intervals through 1917 and 1918 and towards the end of 1918 it issued its report. Considering that some members of this commission wanted to reduce the area of the Sabi Game Reserve as recently as 1915, the report was extraordinarily favourable to the reserves and the ideals embodied in them. The report recommended that there should be no changes to the boundaries of either reserve; that additional staff should be appointed; and most importantly made the following pronouncement:

In the course of our investigations we were not a little struck by the uselessness of having these magnificent reserves merely for the preservation of the fauna - in an area practically unknown and, by the effect of a somewhat stringent policy, made to a great extent inaccessible to the bulk of the people - a policy which it will be increasingly difficult to maintain as applied to so large an area ... for these and other reasons we recommend that the policy of the provincial administration should be directed toward the creation of the area ultimately as a great national park where the natural and prehistoric conditions of our country can be preserved for all time.

During 1923, the first large groups of tourists started visiting the Sabi Game Reserve, but only as part of the South African Railways' popular "Round in Nine" tours. The tourist trains used the Selati railway line between Komatipoort on the Mozambican border and Tzaneen in the then northern Transvaal. The tour included an overnight stop at Sabi Bridge (now Skukuza) and a short walk, escorted by armed rangers, into the bush. It soon became a highlight of the tour and it gave valuable support for the campaign to proclaim the Sabi Game Reserve as a national park.

== The Kruger National Park: 1926–1929 ==
After the proclamation of the Kruger National Park, named for president Paul Kruger (1825-1904), in 1926, the first three tourist cars entered the park in 1927. No accommodation was provided for visitors. They made their own camps in enclosures of thorn bush. Tourists could come and go at any time, day or night. The bad roads prevented any speeding. Night driving, however, had to be ended as too many animals, dazzled by headlights, were getting killed.

A rapid road construction program was started in 1927, and by the end of 1929 a total of 617 km of tourist roads was completed. The first roads connected the established ranger posts.

The all-year round opening of the park had to be ended in 1929. Not only was the effects of rain chaotic on the primitive roads, it also caused a public relations disaster in March 1929 when a large group of American tourists arrived by luxury train at Crocodile Bridge. With two big trucks as transport, they went on a game drive and soon got bogged down after a big rainstorm. One truck also overturned on crossing a stream. The drenched tourists had to perch in thorn trees to avoid lions. Local ranger Hector McDonald and his staff eventually came to the rescue. It was one big adventure, but the bad publicity started when several of these visitors went down with malaria. Apart from the Pretoriuskop area, from 1930 the park was closed down from the end of October until the end of May.

== The 1930s ==
Number of annual visitors to the Kruger National Park
Year	Total visitors
1932	3 025
1938	38 014

The construction of roads continued during the Thirties, and by 1934 about 1,200 km of roads had been completed. This included the roads between Skukuza and Lower Sabie (1931) and between Letaba and Shingwedzi (1933).

During October 1936, the last black rhino in the park was seen by ranger Harry Kirkman in the dense Nwatimhiri bush between Skukuza and Lower Sabie. Kirkman and three members of his staff observed a lone cow for about half an hour before she disappeared again. It was the last sighting of a black rhino in the park and by 1946 the species was extinct in the park.

== The 1940s ==
Because the park shares a long (and unguarded) border with Mozambique, the outbreak of World War II in September 1939 caused little panic among locals and government officials in Pretoria. In June 1940 an alarming report of some two thousand Nazis concentrating on the Mozambican side of the frontier was received by the chief of the Union Defence Force General Staff. He summoned Warden Stevenson-Hamilton to Pretoria to discuss the situation. The bemused Warden managed to calm down the agitated members of the General Staff after explaining that, not only would the Portuguese authorities allow no such thing to happen in their colony, the arrival of even one strange European in the tribal areas would be discussed within days for many miles around.

Despite the war and a steep decline in the number of foreign visitors, 1940 turned out to be a fairly prosperous year for the park. In July 1941 the Greek royal family visited the park. Some six weeks after fleeing the invading German forces, King George II had to flee again: this time from amateur photographers and autograph hunters at Pretoriuskop rest-camp.

The first petrol rationing came at the end of 1941 and it was decided to open the park only so far north as the Sabie River for the 1942 season. The petrol ration was cut again in early 1943. Because this allowed only local tourists to visit the park, the whole park east of Pretoriuskop was closed from 1943 until May 1946.

Warden James Stevenson-Hamilton retired on 30 April 1946, after 44 years as warden of the Kruger Park and its predecessor, the Sabi Game Reserve. He was replaced by Colonel J. A. B. Sandenburg. Sandenburg resigned at the end of 1953.

In 1946 the park resumed with a normal tourist season after the disruption of the war years. The park became even more popular with 58,739 visitors in 1948 compared to 38,014 visitors in 1938.

== The 1950s ==
A Zambesi shark, Carcharhinus leucas, also known as the bull shark, was caught at the confluence of the Limpopo and Luvuvhu Rivers in July 1950. Zambezi sharks tolerate fresh water and can travel far up rivers like the Limpopo.

The then senior ranger, Louis Steyn, was appointed to succeed Sandenburg in 1954.

In 1955, the number of visitors (101,058) exceeded 100,000 a year for the first time.

During 1957 the nest-building activities of two bird species, the spotted-back weaver and lesser masked weaver, threatened to destroy 51 large trees in Skukuza Rest Camp. To save these trees a total of 2,670 birds were destroyed from November 1957 to January 1958.

During 1959, work commenced to completely fence the park boundaries.

== 1960–1969 ==
Numbers of animals culled in the Kruger National Park: 1964–1969
Year	Elephant	Buffalo	Hippo	Zebra	Wildebeest	Impala
1964	-	-	116	-	-	-
1965	-	-	-	10	164	-
1966	-	100	-	173	344	3046
1967	-	-	-	80	562	2497
1968	355	390	-	78	237	1242
1969	460	786	-	387	527	1585

Warden Steyn retired on 20 April 1961. He was replaced by the chief biologist, A. M. Brynard, who took on the new title of nature conservator.

With visitor numbers increasing every new year – 216,680 and 306,346 in 1964 and 1968 respectively – tourist infrastructure was significantly improved during the Sixties. The first big camp (Olifants) for many years was opened in 1960 and more picnic sites were provided. It was also decided to tarmac the surface of arterial roads and the first tarmac road from Numbi Gate to Pretoriuskop and Skukuza was opened in 1965. With better roads, more of the park was opened throughout the year, Skukuza from 1962; Lower Sabie, Crocodile Bridge and as far north as Tshokwane in 1963; and the whole area as far as the Letaba River in 1964.

During October 1961 the first batch of 4 white rhinos were translocated from Natal and released in a special enclosure near Pretoriuskop. They were reintroduced to the park after they became extinct around 1896. By September 1964 a total of 98 white rhinos had been moved to the park.

On 1 January 1968, two trains collided near Randspruit between Skukuza and Crocodile Bridge in the worst train disaster in the park. Fourteen people died with a further 38 seriously injured. Later that same year, construction started to reroute the Selati railway line next to the western boundary of the park between the Sabie and Crocodile Rivers. After construction ended, a limited rail service was maintained between Skukuza and Komatipoort. By 1973, however, the Selati line in the park was finally closed down.

During the late 1960s, the Portuguese colonial authorities in Mozambique started the construction of the huge Cahora Bassa Dam on the Zambezi River. It became apparent that the shortest and cheapest route of the powerlines from the dam to the distribution stations near Pretoria would lead through sensitive ecological regions in the northern Kruger Park. In 1969 Eskom agreed to run the powerlines to the north of the sensitive Nyandu thickets and during the same year work started on the unsightly lines. The section through the Kruger Park was completed by early 1971.

== 1970–1979 ==
Census results for elephant and buffalo for the Kruger National Park: 1970–1978
Year	Elephant	Buffalo
1970	8,821	21,142
1971	7,916	19,785
1972	7,611	21,051
1973	7,965	22,015
1974	7,702	23,284
1975	7,408	23,705
1976	7,275	26,458
1977	7,478	29,672
1978	7,715	27,997

Number of elephant, buffalo and hippopotamus culled in the Kruger National Park: 1970–1979
Year	Elephant	Buffalo	Hippo
1970	1,846	2,502	-
1971	602	1,235	-
1972	608	2,119	-
1973	732	1,451	-
1974	764	807	155
1975	567	1,439	72
1976	285	1,926	151
1977	544	1,149	116
1978	348	1,560	73
1979	322	3,308	77

On 13 March 1970 the chief biologist Dr U. de V. Pienaar was promoted to be Nature Conservator. He replaced A.M. Brynard, who became the new deputy director of National Parks in Pretoria.

The year 1970 was also notable for being one of the driest ever known in the park. Every river - even the Sabie - stopped flowing. Hundreds of dead hippos befouled the little water left in the rivers. Fortunately, 1970 ended with heavy rains and vegetation revived throughout the park. Most of the rivers reached their flood levels and the new Engelhard Dam near Letaba spilled over for the first time on 9 January 1971.

With the 1970/71 summer rainfall season, the park entered a wet cycle with above average rainfall that would last for the rest of the Seventies. An unexpected result was the population crashes of the zebra and wildebeest populations in the Central District between the Sabie and Olifants Rivers. Their numbers declined respectively from 13,050 and 13,950 in 1969 down to 7,523 and 6,745 in 1975. The Central District's zebra and wildebeest populations supported large numbers of predators like lion and spotted hyena [1 lion:111 prey ungulates compared to 1 lion:260 prey ungulates in Tanzania's Ngorongoro Crater]. During normal summers (without excessive grass growth) zebra and wildebeest are more dispersed and predators less successful in catching them. The tremendous increase in grass cover during the summer of 1970/71 (and every 1970s summer thereafter) favoured the hunting activities of predators, leading to an out of control decline. To restore balance, the park ceased the culling of wildebeest (1972) and zebra (1974) and re-introduced carnivore control in December 1974 in selected areas. From 1974 to 1980 a total of 456 lion and 364 spotted hyenas were killed.

On 17 May 1971 the first two black rhinos were reintroduced to the park since their kind became extinct in the 1940s. In 1972, a further 30 black rhinos were sent from Natal and Rhodesia.

Anthrax broke out in the northern areas of the park during September and October 1971. The small population of roan antelope was nearly wiped out. Kudu were also very badly affected.

The National Parks Act of 1976 prohibited prospecting in a national park, but this didn't stop the then state-owned steel company Iscor. They approached the Department of Geological Survey to undertake a 'geological survey' to determine the extent of coking coal deposits between Punda Maria and the Luvhuvhu River. A rich field had been found in Venda and it was possible that the deposits stretched southwards into the Kruger Park. Iscor provided the equipment and teams to undertake this 'geological survey'. Once this became publicly known towards the end of 1977, it aroused grave concern among both the public and conservation circles. It became one of the most emotive issues concerning the park. Protests appeared in the media and petitions opposed to drilling were signed by thousands. The controversy only stopped when Iscor decided to develop the Tshikondeni Mine to the north of the Luvhuvhu River during the early 1980s. The mine stopped producing coking coal at the end of September 2014 and is currently in a rehabilitation phase.

Despite some apprehension, the National Parks Board approved the institution of wilderness trails in the park in June 1977. The first wilderness trail (Wolhuter) was opened in July 1978 near Malelane in the south of the park. It proved to be very popular and more trails were opened soon afterward. The Olifants Trail opened in November 1979, followed by Nyalaland (August 1980) and Bushman (August 1983).

== 1980–1989 ==
Number of elephant, buffalo and hippopotamus culled in the Kruger National Park: 1980–1989
Year	Elephant	Buffalo	Hippo
1980	356	2,286	77
1981	16	2,286	81
1982	427	1,367	303
1983	1,290	2,121	-
1984	1,289	957	-
1985	268	2,383	-
1986	404	1,857	-
1987	245	3,174	-
1988	273	2,603	-
1989	281	2,373	-

By 1980 it was becoming clear that the National Parks Board needed to take a hard look at the racial discrimination against visitors from different race groups. Not only was there a steadily growing demand from other race groups (especially black and Indian) to visit the Kruger Park (bed occupancy increased from 6,783 in 1976 to 7,371 in 1980 and entrance fees paid increased from 14,733 entrants to 18,967 for the same period); it also attracted mixed race groups from the neighbouring self-governing homelands and independent states such as Swaziland who demanded internationally accepted standards of courtesy. Also, embarrassing situations started happening almost daily during peak periods when visitors had to be denied the 'white' facilities in the park. Increasingly visitors also reserved accommodation under assumed names (or had Afrikaans or English surnames) and insisted on the accommodation they reserved on arrival, leading to yet more difficult situations. Although not allowed to go as far as complete desegregation, the board decided in June 1981 to open the restaurants to all races and to create more, and equal, facilities for the other race groups. It was only by the end of the 1980s that the segregation of visitor facilities was completely abandoned.

From May and June 1981 onwards, elephant poaching escalated dramatically in the northern Kruger Park. Mozambican poachers, armed with AK47 automatic rifles, shot and killed numerous elephants for their ivory in the area between the Letaba and Shingwedzi rivers, close to the Mozambican border. At first, the poachers targeted lone bulls, but during 1982 they – using automatic rifles – started firing indiscriminately upon breeding herds. At least 141 elephants were shot and killed between June 1981 and February 1983 with an unknown number wounded. After intensive anti-poaching measures were introduced by park authorities, poaching stopped almost completely by the end of 1983.

The park's tourist infrastructure was significantly expanded and modernised during the Eighties. Starting in 1983, ten new camps (Jock of the Bushveld, Berg-en-Dal, Biyamiti, Talamati, Roodewal, Shimuwini, Boulders, Mopani, Bateleur and Sirheni) were built over the following decade. Apart from Berg-en-Dal and Mopani, these new camps were relatively small. Existing camps were modernised and expanded. New tar roads were also built between Skukuza and Malelane Gate (1982), between Lower-Sabie and Tshokwane Picnic Spot (1984) and between Phalaborwa Gate and Mooiplaas Picnic Spot. The Doispane road between Skukuza and the present Phabeni Gate was also tarred (1989).

In July 1985 Lichtenstein's hartebeest were reintroduced to the park. An initial 26 had been caught and quarantined in Malawi's Kasungu National Park, but after heavy losses due to capture myopathy, only 9 were released in the park. In 1986 a further 15 animals were translocated to the park.

Despite sharing a border with two hostile states; Mozambique since 1975, and Zimbabwe since 1980; the Kruger Park was remarkably little affected by the political turmoil in southern Africa between the early 1970s and 1994. The most serious incident in the park was the Gonde-Gonde incident in July 1988. On the 11th, a park vehicle detonated a landmine a few kilometres south of Pafuri. No one was hurt. Over the following two days, park staff followed footprints to the Gonde-Gonde hill near Shingwedzi, where they came under heavy gunfire. A South African Air Force helicopter gunship was called in to help the park staff and a day later two insurgents were killed close to the main entrance of Shingwedzi Rest Camp.

== 1990–1999 ==
Number of elephant and buffalo culled in the Kruger National Park: 1990–1994
Year	Elephant	Buffalo
1990	232	924
1991	218	1,686
1992	185	46
1993	308	87
1994	177	No cull
1995	No cull	No cull

The 1991/92 season was the driest in the recorded history of the park. The low rainfall was compounded by extremely high temperatures in February 1992. On 26 February 1992 record temperatures were recorded at Punda Maria (45 °C), Shingwedzi (48 °C), Letaba (47.2 °C), Sirheni (46.7 °C), Skukuza (45.6 °C) and Pretoriuskop (41.5 °C).

In 1994 the board placed a moratorium on the culling of elephants in the Kruger Park.

== 2000–2019 ==
On 4 September 2001, a veld fire broke out in the Pretoriuskop region of the park, which lasted several days as a result of unusually windy conditions and fire breaks being insufficiently cleared. A total of 23 people died and 11 were injured, although 15 could have survived had they remained in their camp instead of evacuating. An inquiry by Mr. D. D. Ngobeni of the South African Police Service, concluded that the fire was manmade and began in the area close to Napi boulders.

=== Poaching ===
Number of rhino poached in the Kruger National Park: 2000 - 2015
Year	Rhino poached
2000	0
2001	4
2002	14-20
2003	8-14
2004	7
2005	10
2006	17
2007	10
2008	36
2009	50
2010	146
2011	252
2012	425
2013	606
2014	827
2015	290 (January - April)

In the 2000s, rhino poaching started to become a major issue for Kruger National Park, with numbers increasing rapidly between 2000 and 2014. An anti-poaching effort was put into place in order to reduce the number of rhino poached. In addition to having a major effect on the rhino populations, the poaching also poses a long-term threat to tourism to Kruger. In 2012, the drastic rise in poaching led to the formation of a new anti-poaching unit of the South African Police Service. By the end of August 2015, however, 749 rhinos had been poached in the park that year, exceeding the nationwide total for the previous year to that point. By 2018, poaching in Kruger was decreasing as poachers moved to new areas, especially Kwazulu-Natal.

On 1 May 2019, SANParks arrested a former ranger. A follow-up operation on 2 May 2019 by Malelane rangers and supported by both a K9 and air unit arrested two suspected poachers. Heavy calibre hunting rifles, ammunition and poaching equipment were recovered in both cases. On 24 July 2019, SANParks announced the arrests of nine additional poaching suspects between 20 July 2019 and 23 July 2019. One of the dogs from an assisting K9 unit was lost, but later found unharmed. However, a poached buffalo was also found in the area alongside the carcasses of a hooded vulture, a white-headed vulture, and 117 white-backed vultures in the Vlatkeplaas section of the park. Despite an overall decrease in rhino poaching in Kruger, 190 were still killed and there were 1,202 poaching-related incidents recorded in the first half of 2019.

Although the poaching statistics seemed to peak in 2014, the statistics were brought into question with claims of underreporting.

On 1 April 2019, a suspected rhino poacher was killed by an elephant and later eaten by a pride of lions. News came out after rangers discovered the remains of the body in the Crocodile Bridge section of the park on 4 April 2019 and a police incident was filed. Four other suspected poachers in the same party were arrested. Several hunting rifles and ammunition were seized as well. Due to the ironic nature of the incident, it gained traction with international media. A similar event on 3 July 2018 also made international media.

=== Blue-green Algae ===
In the late 2000s, blue-green algae blooms started appearing at many of the water holes in the area. In July 2007, it was discovered that algal poisoning was the cause of the deaths of at least 54 animals near Crocodile Bridge, after which the Nhlanganzwane Dam was breached in order to prevent further algae buildup. On 15 April 2008, the Kruger Park rangers and conservation management began draining Silolweni Dam near Tshokwane in order to prevent algal poisoning of the area's wildlife. The heavy concentration of algae was due to a high concentration of hippo in the dam. Lowering the water levels discouraged hippo from visiting the area, which reduced the algae.

== 2020-Present ==
In March 2020, due to the spread of COVID-19 to South Africa, all South African national parks, including Kruger, were closed to new visitors. International visitors in the national parks from high risk countries were placed into isolation within the parks. Conservation continued as normal, with distancing and isolation practices used to reduce risk. A phased reopening of the parks was announced in August, with Skukuza and Lower Sabie operating at reduced capacity and Biyamiti, Maroela and Orpen remaining closed. Further reopening was announced to occur between October and December 2020.

Two fires broke out within a week of each other at camps in September 2020. The first, starting late at night at Letaba Rest Camp, damaged the TV room and the shop. The second, at Berg en Dal Rest Camp, affected the kitchen, deli and bar areas, which were rented out by Tindlovu. While the Letaba fire caused the shop to be shut down entirely while the building's state was considered and an investigation was launched, the Berg en Dal fire occurred during the day. Maintenance workers were already on site, so the fire was contained much faster than the Letaba fire.

== See also ==
- Abel Chapman
- Society for the Preservation of the Wild Fauna of the Empire
