= Gangala-na-Bodio =

Gangala-na-Bodio Gangara
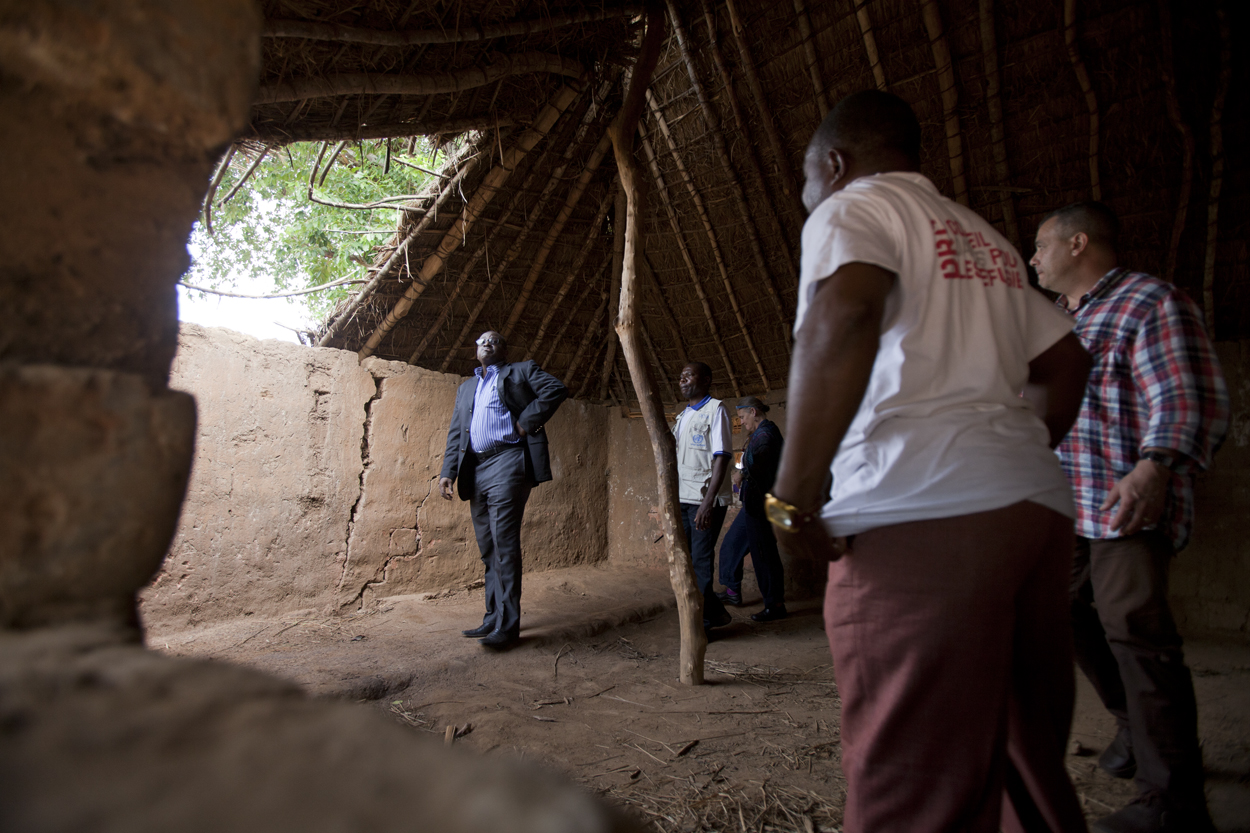
- Humanitarian experts in Gangala-na-Bodio, 2012

- Location in Democratic Republic of the Congo
- Coordinates: 3.67998°N 29.13488°E
- Country: Democratic Republic of the Congo
- Province: Haut-Uele
- Territory: Dungu
- Climate: Aw
- National language: Lingala

Gangala-na-Bodio is a town in Haut-Uele Province, in the northeastern part of the Democratic Republic of the Congo. It is best known as the site of the Gangala-na-Bodio Elephant Domestication Center during the Belgian colonial period.

== Geography ==
Gangala-na-Bodio lies within the Uele River basina region characterized by a mix of savanna and equatorial forest. The surrounding area is sparsely populated, with local communities relying primarily onsubsistence agriculturefishing, and small-scale trade.

== Economy ==
Today, the local economy is largely rural and agricultural, with limited infrastructure connecting Gangala-na-Bodio to larger urban centers in Haut-Uele.
