= Letaba Rest Camp =

Rest camp in Kruger National Park, South Africa

Letaba
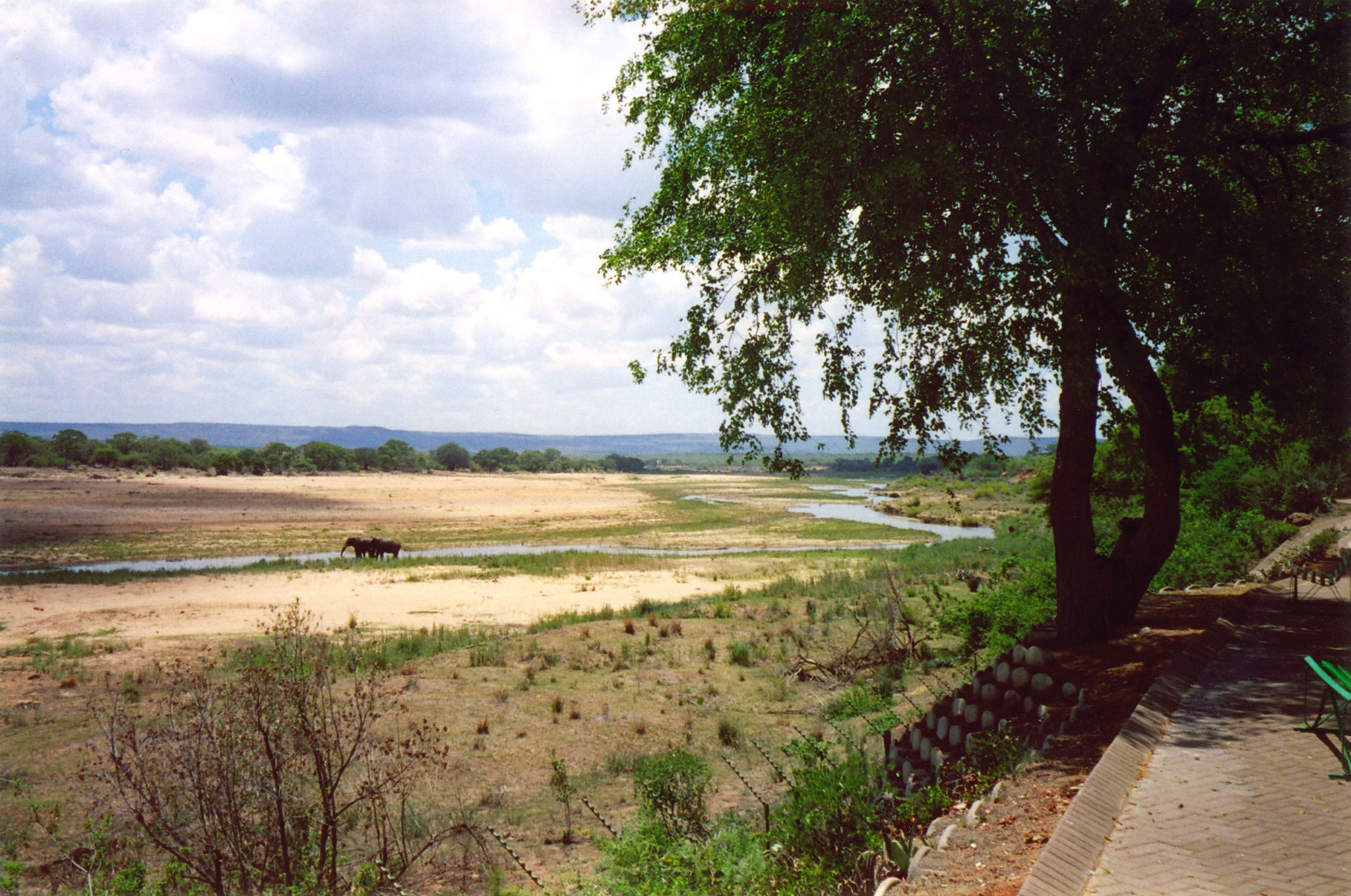
- View of the river from the camp perimeter
- Interactive map of Letaba
- Location: South bank of the Letaba River
- Coordinates: 23.8543796°S 31.5766711°E
- Elevation: 225 m (738 ft)
- Campsites: 60 tent or caravan sites
- Residences: 5 three-bed huts with communal ablutions; 10 two-bed and 10 four-bed permanent furnished canvas tents on stilts; 86 rondavels; 10 six-bed guest cottages; Melville guest house (sleeps 9); Fish Eagle guest house (sleeps 8)
- Restaurants: Tindlovu (website)
- Facilities: Communal ablutions and cooking facilities for campsites and huts; Laundromat; Park shop; Petrol station; Mobile phone reception; Swimming pool
- Water: potable
- Operated by: South African National Parks
- Website: www.sanparks.org/parks/kruger/camps/letaba/

Letaba is a main rest camp along the Letaba River in the north-central region of Kruger National Park in South Africa. It is situated at the junction of the H1-5 (the park's main north road) and the H9 road westward to Phalaborwa gate. The name comes from the Sesotho word for "river of sand", because of the wide, generally shallow river.

== History ==
The area around Letaba had been settled for millennia before the creation of Kruger Park. In the 1800s, the inhabitants of the land were the Ba-Phalaborwa people, a Sotho-speaking tribe who inhabited the area. They were primarily crop and cattle farmers, but had an extensive iron smithing expertise, trading their iron goods with Arab merchants along the east coast of southern Africa, in what is today Mozambique. The people of the area were removed during the creation of Kruger National Park, but most of their descendants live just outside the park's gates.

=== Fire ===
On the evening of 9 September 2020, a fire burned a significant part of the shop at Letaba, which was put out by firefighter teams from Olifants and Phalaborwa, as well as staff and guests at the camp. There were no fatalities or injuries, but the shop had to be closed to be rebuilt on a new premises; it reopened in 2023. Less than a week later, a similar fire burned down the restaurant at Berg-en-Dal Rest Camp.

== Facilities ==
Letaba features a Tindlovu restaurant overlooking the Letaba river, a small conference centre with a 55-seat auditorium, two swimming pools (one outside in the day visitor's area), laundromat, filling station, slimline ATM, and first aid station.

== Activities ==
Letaba is in a fairly dark area of the park, making stargazing an ideal nighttime activity. The camp also provides guided bush walks, game drives, breakfasts and dinners in the wild and a TV lounge. There is also a riverside camp walk along the inside of the camp's perimeter fence.

=== Nearby attractions ===
Letaba is near several wilderness and 4x4 trails, the Matambeni bird hide, and the ruins of the Masorini settlement.

==== Masorini ====
38 km from Letaba along the Phalaborwa road is the ruins of a BaPhalaborwa tribe village from the 1800s called Masorini. It was likely a trading hub connecting Venda farmers in the north with Portuguese, Arab, and Chinese traders along the east coast. There is a museum and picnic area on site with guided tours on foot to the top of the hill, where reconstructed furnaces and huts can be seen.

=== Game viewing ===
Letaba lies in Mopani veld, which has quite dense bush of mopane trees (Colophospermum mopane). As a result, the animal density is lower than can be expected further south near Skukuza and Lower Sabie. However, bushbuck, elephant, buffalo, and waterbuck are still quite common. Secretary birds, kori bustards and ground hornbills are known to inhabit the area.

=== Flora and Geology ===
Letaba is in a transition zone between the granite and gneiss to its west and basalt to the east, providing some unique geology. To the west of camp, clusterleaf shrub is common, while the east side gets more apple-leaf. The entire area is filled with mopane trees. Tamboti, knobthorn and leadwood are also common in the area.

== Elephant Hall ==
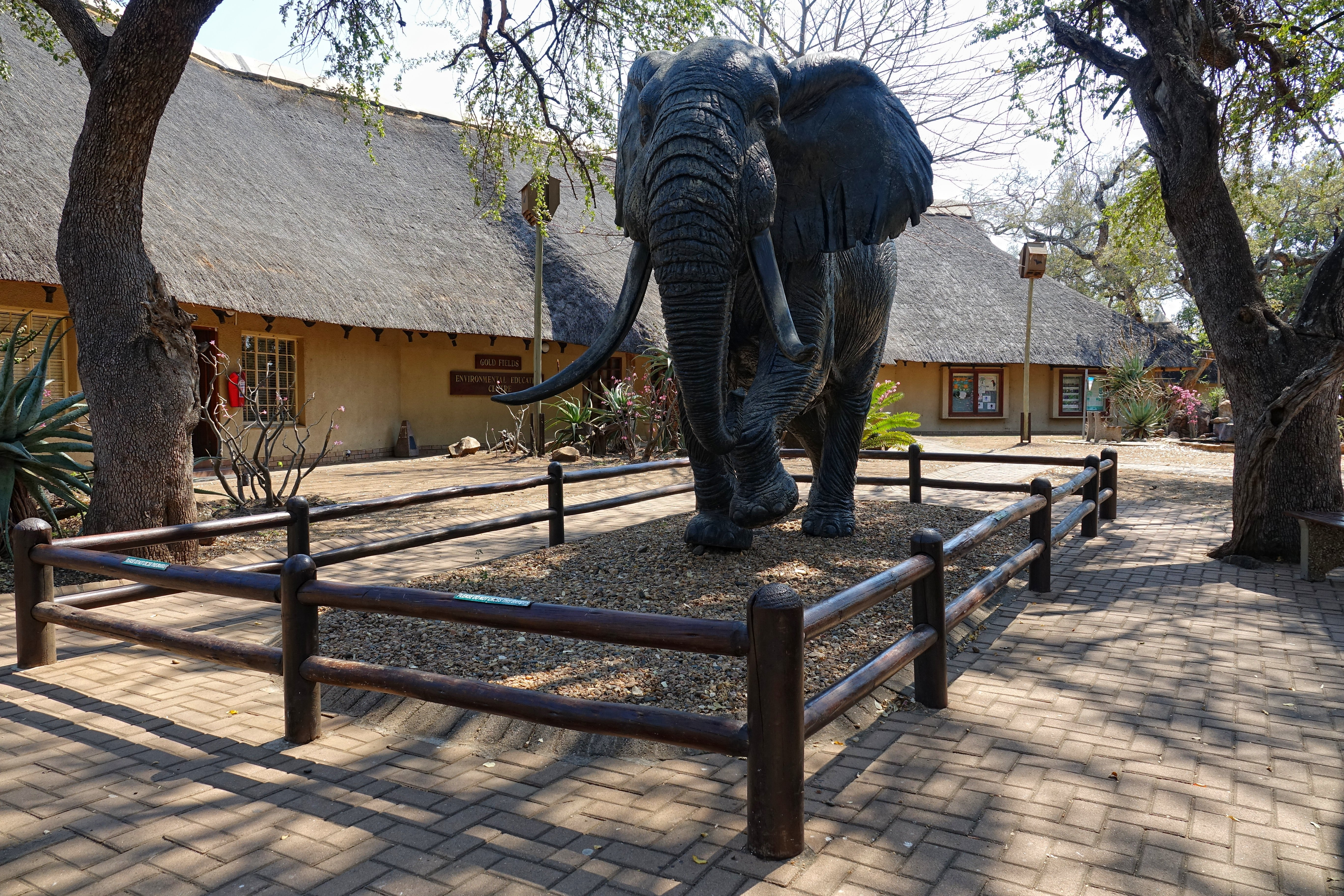
Elephant statue outside the Letaba Elephant Hall

Unique to Letaba amongst camps in Kruger is the Elephant Hall, a small museum dedicated to elephants. It includes sections about elephant biology, behaviour, ecology and evolution. The primary exhibit is the display of the tusks and skulls of the Magnificent Seven, a set of enormous tuskers (elephant bulls with very large tusks). The hall was renovated in 2017 with financial assistance from donors worldwide and design assistance from professor Kevin Todd and his students at the University of the Sunshine Coast in Queensland, Australia.

=== The Magnificent Seven ===
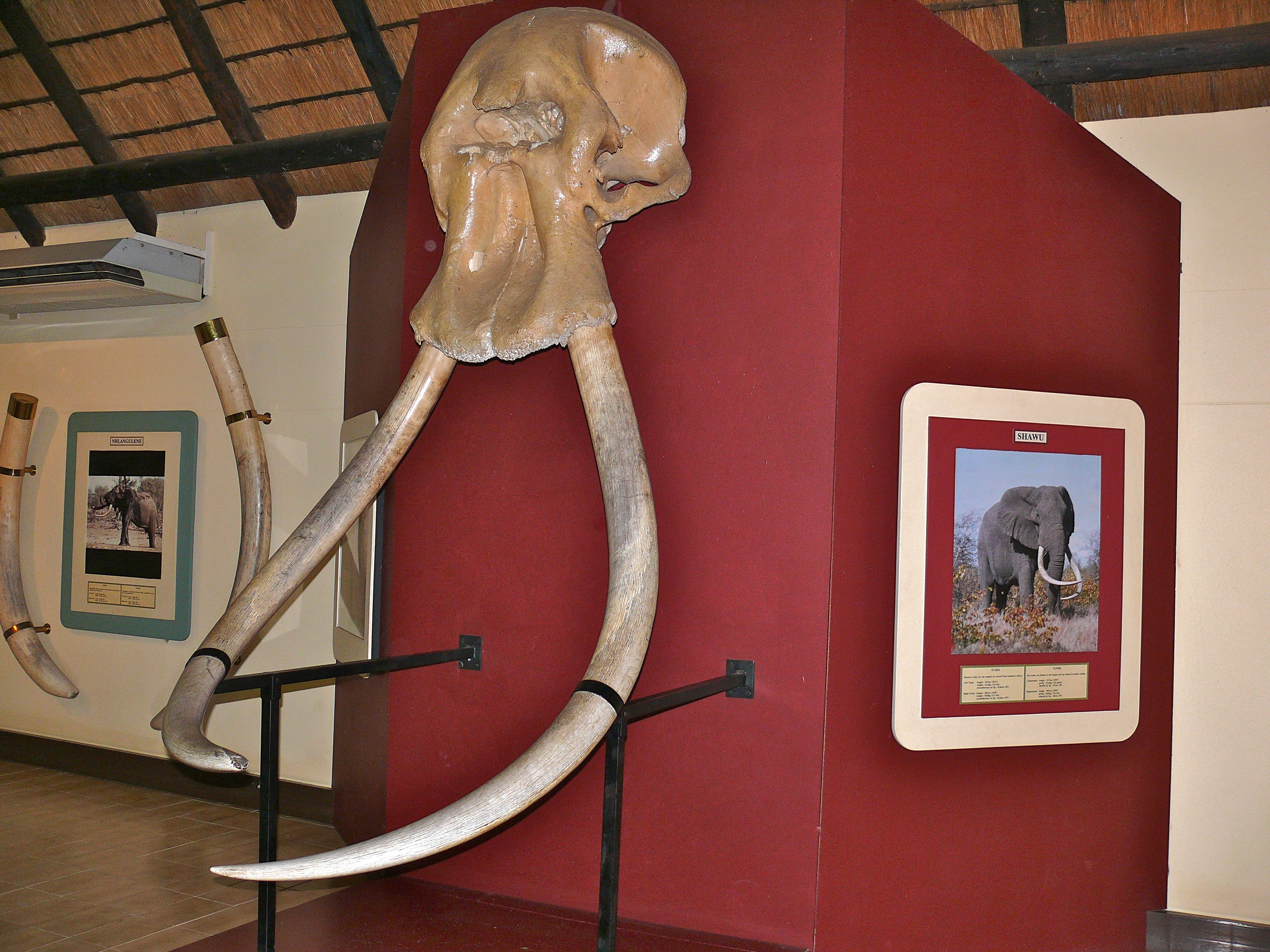
The skull and tusks of Shawu in the Elephant Hall before its renovation

The Magnificent Seven—Dzombo, João, Kambaku, Mafunyane, Ndlulamithi, Shawu and Shingwedzi—were seven large bull elephants with enormous tusks ("tuskers"). Each elephant had at least one tusk that weighed at least 50 kg, and all of their tusks were at least 2 m long. Dr. U de V Pienaar, the chief warden of Kruger National Park in the 1970s, decided to publicise these elephants as an example of Kruger's successful conservation work. As each elephant died, their skull and ivory were recovered and brought to the Elephant Hall, with the exception of João, whose tusks broke off in 1984 and were never found. A section of the elephant hall is dedicated to each of them.

Magnificent Seven statistics
Name	Life span	Tusk length		Tusk mass		Tusk circumference at lip	
Name	Life span	Left	Right	Left	Right	Left	Right
Dzombo	c. 1935-1983	255 cm	237 cm	55.5 kg	56.8 kg	50 cm	51 cm
João	died c. 1984	271 cm	250 cm	70 kg	60 kg	51 cm	51 cm
Kambaku	c. 1930-1985	259 cm	265 cm	63.2 kg	64 kg	51 cm	52 cm
Mafunyane	Carcass discovered 1983-11-16	251 cm	251 cm	55.1 kg	55.1 kg	48 cm	48 cm
Ndlulamithi	c. 1927-1985	287 cm	273 cm	64.6 kg	57.2 kg	48.5 cm	48 cm
Shawu	died in October 1982	317 cm	305 cm	52.6 kg	50.8 kg	45 cm	45 cm
Shingwedzi	c. 1934-1981	207 cm	264 cm	47.2 kg	58.1 kg	47.5 cm	48 cm

==== Emerging Tuskers Project ====
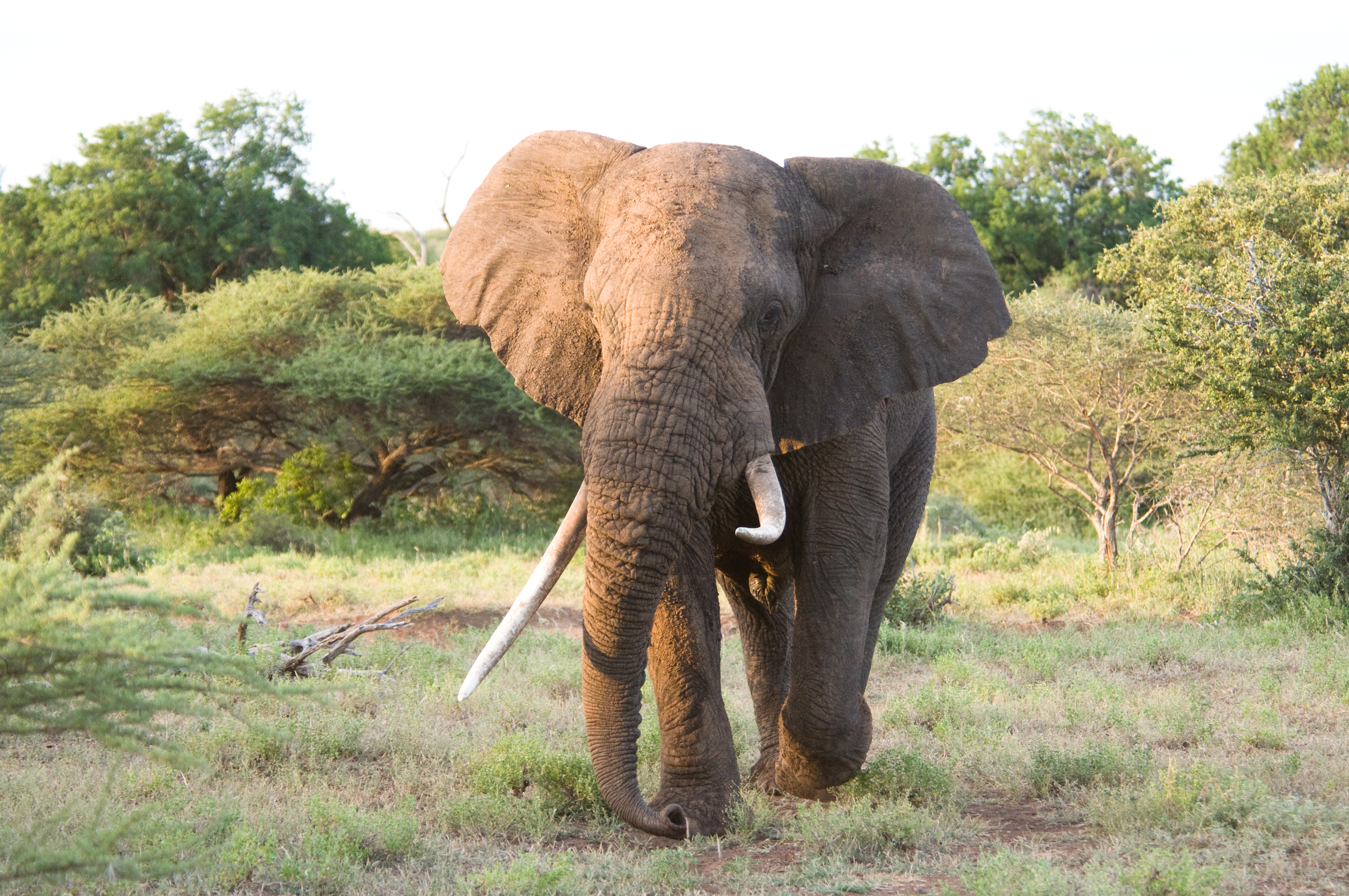
Mbazo, a tusker with very unusually shaped ivory, first recorded in 2008 as part of the emerging tuskers competition

Kruger National Park is host to a number of current tuskers. Once identified, each tusker is officially named and their home range and features are determined. The list of current tuskers is available on the South African National Parks website, alongside the list of deceased tuskers and female tuskers. The Emerging Tuskers Project relies on submitted photos to help identify new tuskers and track the movement of existing tuskers. Contact information can be found on the Emerging Tuskers Project web page.

=== 2017 Renovation ===
In early 2017 the Elephant Hall was shut down for renovation. With the help of over R1.5 million in donations from Australia's University of the Sunshine Coast and the South African National Parks Honorary Rangers, it was reopened on 2017-03-20 after nine weeks of renovation. The renovated museum features a more modern design, clearer display panels and design improvements. The renovation also meant the addition of the tusks of Mandleve, the largest ivory-carrying elephant ever recorded in Kruger park, who died of natural causes in 1993. The addition of the Mandleve tusk display was sponsored by Rotary International. The renovation also includes a new lighting system, allowing photographs without the use of flash photography. Future plans include the development of a virtual tour of the elephant hall available on the SANParks website.
