= Mpumalanga Tourism and Parks Agency =

South African governmental organization

The Mpumalanga Tourism and Parks Agency (MTPA) Board (formerly Mpumalanga Parks Board) is a governmental organisation responsible for maintaining wilderness areas and public nature reserves in Mpumalanga Province, South Africa.

== Parks managed by the MTPA ==
- Barberton Nature Reserve
- Blyde River Canyon Nature Reserve, see also Blyde River Canyon
- Loskop Dam Nature Reserve
- Mabusa Nature Reserve
- Mahushe Shongwe Reserve
- Mdala Game Reserve
- Mkhombo Nature Reserve
- Mthethomusha Game Reserve
- Nooitgedacht Dam Nature Reserve
- Ohrigstad Dam Nature Reserve
- Songimvelo Game Reserve
- SS Skosana Nature Reserve
- Verloren Valei Nature Reserve

=== Private and other parks ===
- Exeter Private Game Reserve
- Edeni Game Reserve
- Josefsdal Songimvelo Game Reserve
- K'Shani Private Game Reserve
- Mthethomusha Game Reserve
- Sabi Sands Private Game Reserve
  - Sabi Sabi Private Game Reserve
  - Mala Mala Game Reserve
  - Djuma Game Reserve
  - Lion Sands Reserve
  - Londolozi Private Game Reserve
  - Singita Game Reserve
  - Ulusaba Private Game Reserve.
- SterkSpruit Nature Reserve

== National Parks and associated reserves in the province ==
- Greater Kruger National Park
- Associated Private Nature Reserves
  - Kruger National Park

The original Kruger National Park, covers the eastern parts of both the Limpopo, and Mpumalanga, provinces of South Africa.

== See also ==
- South African National Parks
- Protected areas of South Africa
