= Greytown =

Greytown may refer to one of several places:

- Greytown, KwaZulu-Natal, a town in South Africa
  - Greytown (House of Assembly of South Africa constituency)
- Greytown, New Zealand, a town in the southern North Island's Wairarapa region
- Greytown, Nicaragua, the capital city of the municipality of San Juan de Nicaragua

== See also ==
- Graytown (disambiguation)
