= Mpumalanga (disambiguation) =

Mpumalanga is a province of South Africa.

Mpumalanga may also refer to:

- Mpumalanga, KwaZulu-Natal, a town in KwaZulu-Natal
- Mpumalanga cricket team
- Mpumalanga Black Aces F.C.
- Mpumalanga Parks Board
