= Nxumalo =

Nxumalo is a surname. Notable people with the surname include:

- Bright Nxumalo (born 1978), Swazi footballer
- Conny Nxumalo (1967-2020), South African social worker
- Gideon Nxumalo (1929-1970), South African jazz pianist and marimba player
- Henry Nxumalo (1917–1957), South African investigative journalist
- Lerato Nxumalo (born 1999), South African actress and influencer
- Muntu Nxumalo (born 1957), South African singer
- Mzala Nxumalo (1955-1991), South African activist and intellectual
- Nkosinathi Nxumalo, South African politician
- Prince Nxumalo (born 1990), South African footballer
- Samuel Dickenson Nxumalo, South African politician
- Sishayi Nxumalo (1936–2000), Swazi politician
- Tiki Nxumalo (1950–2015), South African actor
- Wonderboy Nxumalo (1975–2008), South African artist
- Zandile Nxumalo (born 2003), South African-Swazi singer-songwriter as Zee Nxumalo
