= Mapogo lion coalition =

Former coalition of male South African lions

The Mapogo lion coalition was a band of male South African lions that controlled the Sabi Sand region in Kruger National Park between 2006 and 2012. Researchers named the coalition for a brutal security company, "Mapogo A Mathamaga Security". "Mapogo" means "vigilantes", as well as "rogues" in Zulu.

The coalition became infamous for their sheer power and strength in taking over and dominating an area of approximately 70,000 ha (170,000 acres). It is believed the Mapogos killed in excess of 40 lions and cubs in a little over a year. The statistics may be higher given their coverage of such large territories. At its peak, the coalition consisted of six males: the leader Makulu (also spelled as Makhulu), Pretty Boy, Rasta, Dreadlocks, Kinky Tail and Mr. T.

== History ==
The Mapogo coalition originated from a Mala Mala based pride called the "Eyrefield Pride" (Sparta Pride). The Mapogo lions followed a recent trend in the Sabi Sand Reserve of mega pride male lion coalitions — the five related brothers themselves had been sired by a similar mega pride coalition of five male lions. The oldest Mapogo male, Makulu, is believed to be the paternal half-brother to the other five lions — the original Sparta pride had lost a male sub-adult of 20 to 21 months of age in May/June 2000; Makulu would join the pride in July 2000, therefore being roughly the same age as the lost sub-adult. Though not readily accepted by the lionesses, the West Street Males tolerated him and did not kill him, even though typically, intruding males of his age would be chased off or killed. Field experts believe a likely reason for his acceptance into the pride was because he may have been the offspring of one of the West Street Males and a lioness from another pride (therefore making him the Mapogos' half brother).

In the first months of 2006, the five subadult lions and Makulu left their pride. Despite the fact they were now fending for themselves, they increased their chances of survival by sticking together, and eventually learned how to take down large prey such as hippos, young rhinos, giraffes and on one occasion a fully grown elephant. They were, however, professional cape buffalo hunters, which, according to Dave Salmoni, was their "key to success". During the buffalo hunts, Kinky Tail (also called Shaka) and Mr. T (also called Mohawk and later SaTan) were often observed being more aggressive in bringing down the buffalo.

=== Rise of the Mapogo coalition ===
The Mapogos took over their first territory in 2006. They entered the northern Sabi Sand, dominated by four male lions, one of which was immediately killed by the Mapogos. The remaining three males were then driven off. With the Ottawa males gone, the Mapogos quickly found and killed all eleven of their cubs in order to mate with the three resident lionesses. Mr. T was reported to have eaten some of the cubs, despite cannibalistic behavior in lions being uncommon. During their reign, the Mapogos took control of eight prides and became the dominant male coalition of the Sabi Sand, having reportedly killed over a hundred lions from neighboring prides.

=== Split in the coalition ===
Despite their large territory, the coalition was riddled with internal competition and rivalry, mainly between Mr. T, assisted by Kinky Tail, and Makulu. Eventually, a heavy fight ensued between Mr. T and Makulu, with the latter emerging victorious after managing to bite through one of Mr. T's paws. Soon after that fight, the coalition split into two smaller coalitions, with Mr. T and Kinky Tail moving to the eastern section of the territory and Makulu, Rasta, Dreadlocks and Pretty Boy remaining in the western section. While it was clear that the two coalitions had very distinct regions and most likely wouldn't reform in the foreseeable future, Mr. T and Kinky Tail controlled their territory in a way that helped protect their brothers in the west, as the only way to reach the western Mapogos was from the east, which Mr. T and Kinky Tail regularly patrolled.

=== Arrival of the Majingilane ===
Mr. T and Kinky Tail were then seen patrolling and guarding their territory for two years, managing to fight off multiple rival lions. However, in June 2010, a coalition of five male lions named the Majingilanes entered their territory, being witnessed scent-marking and roaring loudly. Sensing the intrusion, Kinky Tail and Mr. T were able to isolate the oldest of Majingilane males who had been feeding on a buffalo carcass beforehand. Upon catching the intruder, Mr. T bit down on the male's neck while Kinky Tail ripped apart the male's groin area, inflicting tears and bleeding. It was also noticed that Kinky Tail would roar when he was biting into the Majingilane, showing dominance. The Majingilane male tried to fight back, and did manage to injure both Mr. T in the nose and ear, and Kinky Tail in his paw. Nevertheless, the two Mapogo brothers managed to break the Majingilane male's rear legs and pelvis, leaving him mortally wounded. He was found dead at 7am the next morning, and the two brothers were seen treating their injuries.

=== Kinky Tail's death ===
Later that same night, a filming crew witnessed the four remaining younger Majingilane lions on the move. Four of them were exposed to Kinky Tail, who immediately charged on them all by himself. While they ran, two of the Majingilanes managed to veer off and come up from behind to attack Kinky Tail, and were then aided by the remaining two males, successfully managing to pin him down, with one lion biting his neck, one his back, and another his testicles and genitalia. They proceeded to snap Kinky Tail's spine, immobilizing him and leaving a hole roughly the size of a thumb breaking his orbital socket, leaving him with no chance of survival. With his previous location still unknown, Mr. T eventually arrived to try to help his fallen brother, but he was outnumbered and forced to flee, with two of the Majingilanes unsuccessfully attempting to track him before reuniting with their brothers to finish off Kinky Tail by eating him alive. He was seen taking his last breath twenty minutes into this last attack.

=== Mr. T and his brothers reunited ===
Toward the end of June, Mr. T ran into the Majingilanes, who were again unsuccessful in killing him, though they did kill two of his cubs and drove the remaining lionesses and their cubs away. As a result, Mr. T returned to the western section to reunite with his old coalition, who, to the field guides' surprise, willingly welcomed him back. However, soon after being accepted back, Mr. T began to track down, massacre, and eat three of his brothers' cubs. His brothers did nothing to stop him, and Mr. T quickly began mating with the Ximhungwe females. Shortly after this, Rasta disappeared from the coalition, and is believed to have been killed by either poachers or the Majingilanes. Around the end of November 2010, Dreadlocks left the game reserve and was caught up deliberately in a snare by locals shortly after next to a carcass, cutting the Mapogos down to just three members: Makulu (12), Pretty Boy (10) and Mr. T(9).

=== Death of Mr. T ===
On March 16, 2012, a new rival coalition, the Selatis, would arrive in the last of Mapogo territory through the south. The four of them were able to single out Mr. T, with his two brothers reportedly not being present in the area. By the time the film crew and wildlife officials came to the scene, Mr. T had multiple wounds all over his front and shoulders and had suffered a spinal cord injury that rendered his back legs paralyzed. The four Selatis would attack him in a consistent pattern of distracting Mr. T from the front to allow them to flank him, bite his spine and maul him for about 20 seconds. The Selatis would then stop, move away, wait, then begin the assault again. This pattern was repeated several times before the Selatis then left the crippled Mr. T to die by the road.

Makulu and Pretty Boy had no choice but to leave their territory. They fought a coalition of two Kruger males (Freddy and Limper) to occupy their territory, but were unsuccessful (although Limper later died from his injuries). They were then sighted in 2012, entering the Kruger National Park through the gate attributed to Paul Kruger, and were seen once again feeding on a buffalo in October/November 2012. Unfortunately, Pretty Boy succumbed to a bout of TB by the end of November, still with Makulu by his side. The last confirmed sighting of Makulu was in January 2013. No body ever found, and he was estimated to have passed around March of that year. At this point, he was almost 15 years old and had largely exceeded the average life expectancy for male lions.

== In film ==
Daniel Huertas directed the documentary Brothers in Blood: The Lions of Sabi Sand, which was released in 2015 in the UK. The documentary summarized the 16-year span of the rise and eventual fall of the Mapogo coalition. The documentary aired as an eight-episode series in the United States on Animal Planet.
