= Elands River (Olifants) =

River in South Africa

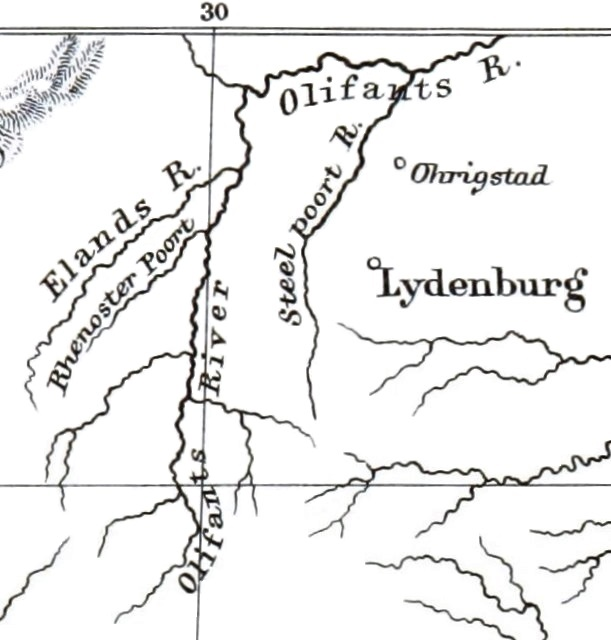
- The Elands shown as a tributary of the Olifants on a map of 1887

- Location of the Elands River mouth
- Etymology: Named after the Common Eland (Taurotragus oryx)

Location
- Country: South Africa
- Province: Gauteng, Mpumalanga and Limpopo

Physical characteristics
- Source
  - location: West of Bronkhorstspruit
  - elevation: 1,480 m (4,860 ft)
- Mouth: Olifants River (Limpopo)
  - location: Arabie Dam
  - coordinates: 24°52′52″S 29°21′23″E
  - elevation: 971 m (3,186 ft)

The Elands River (Afrikaans: Elandsrivier) is a river in the former Transvaal area, South Africa. It is a tributary of the Olifants River, part of the Limpopo River basin.

== Course ==
The Elands River originates west of Bronkhorstspruit, Gauteng Province, flowing northwards and then bending northeastwards into the Rust de Winter Dam, where the Rust De Winter Nature Reserve is located. A few kilometers downstream it flows into the larger Rhenosterkop Dam. Finally it joins the Olifants River at the head of the Arabie Dam reservoir.

== Dams in the river ==
- Rust de Winter Dam
- Rhenosterkop Dam

== Gallery ==
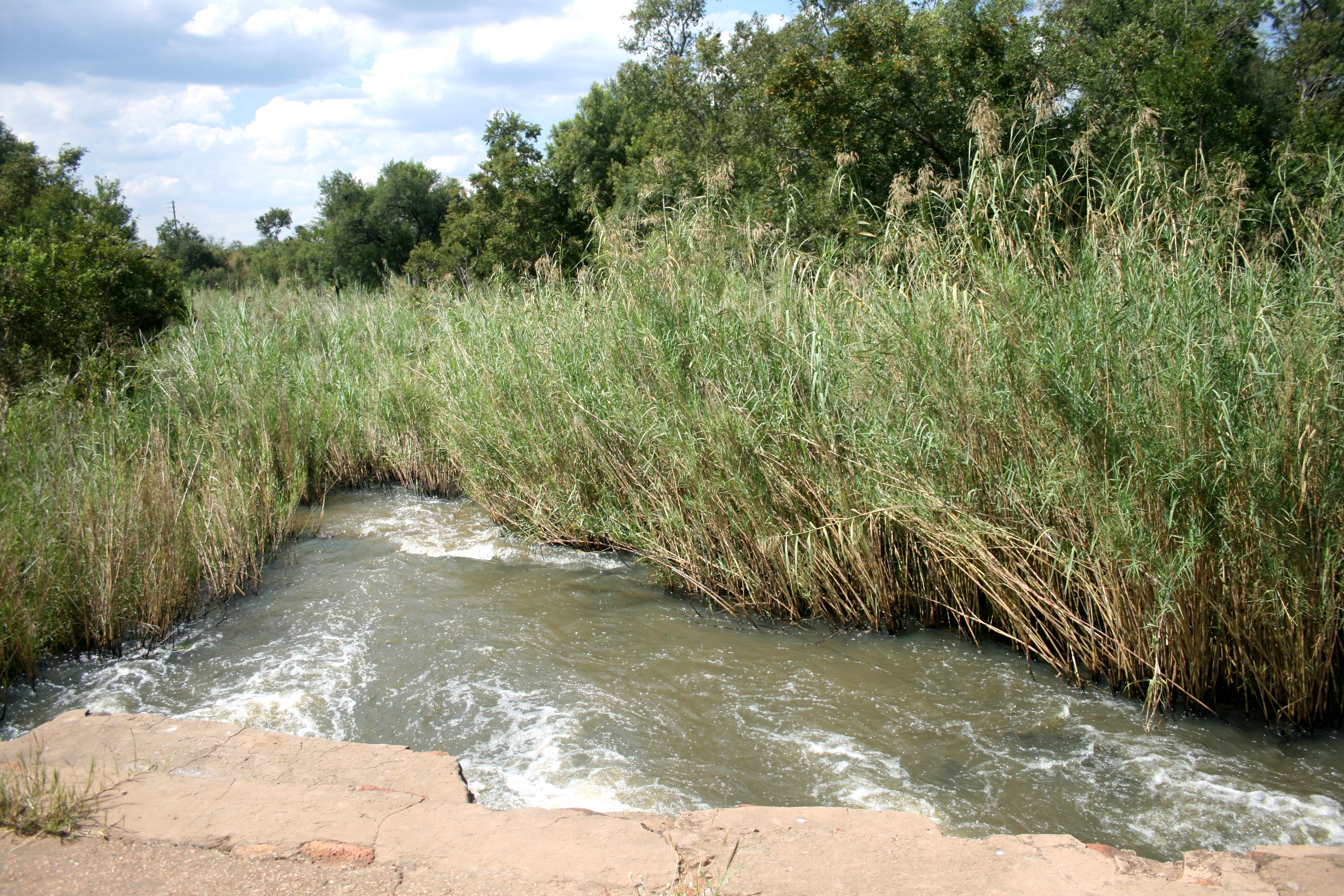
The Elands just upstream of Rust de Winter Dam

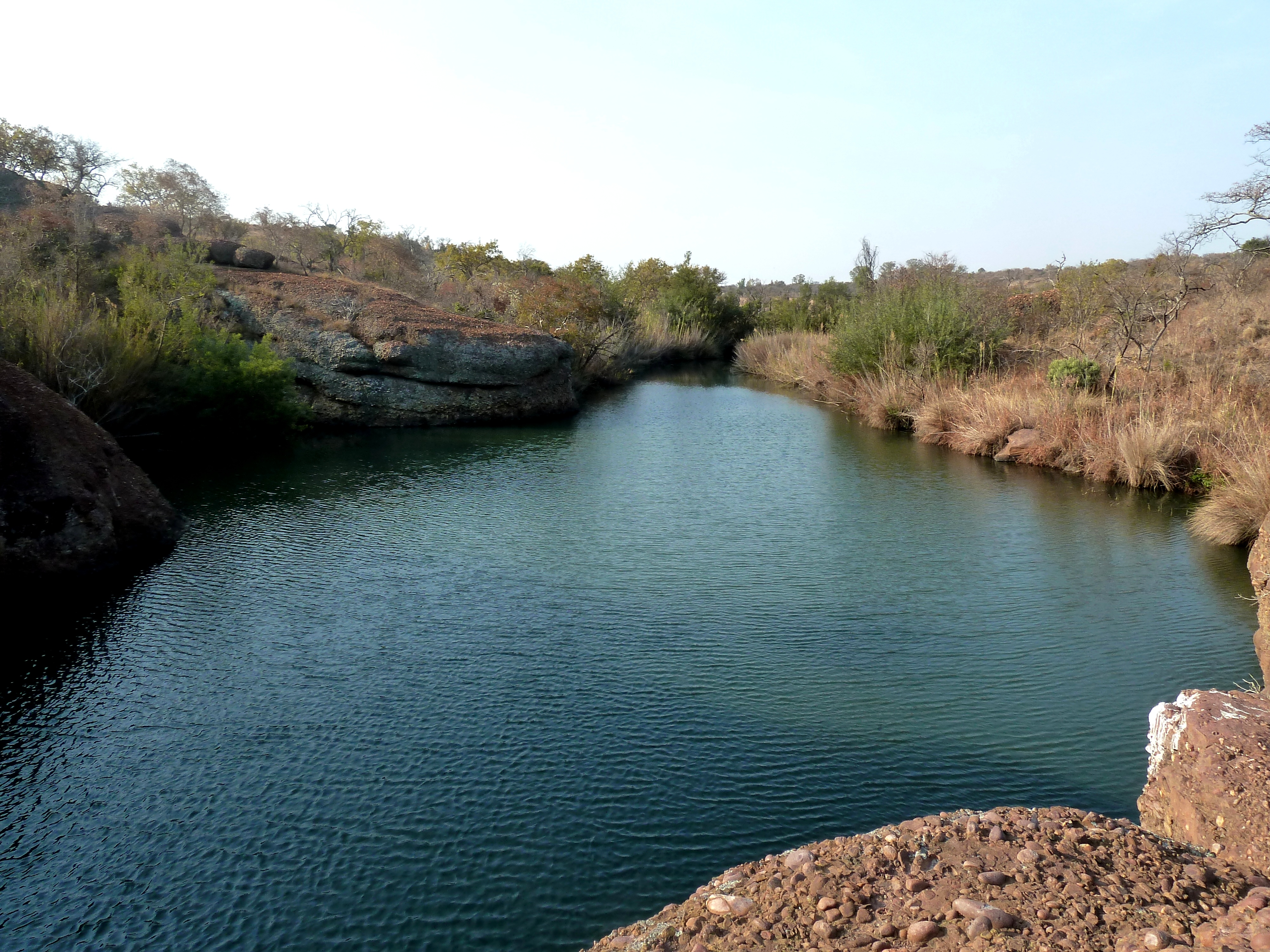
A rock pool in a tributary in the Bankenveld, which is likewise known as Elands River
