= WildEarth =

- Company type: private
- Industry: Education; Entertainment; Broadcasting
- Founded: 2006
- Headquarters: Hoedspruit, Maruleng Local Municipality (Mopani District Municipality), Limpopo, South Africa
- Area served: Worldwide
- Key people: Graham Walling (Co-founder); Emily Wallington (Co-Founder/CEO)
- Products: SafariLive
- Services: live safari drives; 24/7 live camera

WildEarth (founded in 2006 by Emily Wallington and Graham Wallington) is a British-South African broadcasting and conservation company primarily based at Djuma Game Reserve, part of the Sabi Sand Game Reserve in South Africa, who focus on connecting people with African Wildlife. The company is best known for its live drives (formerly known as SafariLive during WildEarth's partnership with National Geographic from 2017 to 2019), which take place twice a day in Sabi Sands and Pridelands. Former locations included Tswalu Kalahari, Karongwe Private Game Reserve, Phinda, Ngala and Arathusa.

The company has been featured on news broadcasts such as CNN, The Washington Post, NBC News, Yahoo! and BBC News due to the popularity and viewship of the live drives increasing during the COVID-19 pandemic, which has restricted international travel to and from Africa.

From 2020 to 2021, WildEarth collaborated with guiding companies such as AndBeyond, who broadcast the drives from both Ngala and Phinda Reserves (starting from April 2020), Eco Training, who broadcast the drives from Karongwe between April 2019 to May 2019 (these drives were prematurely ended, however, due to a hunting incident that took place at Karongwe in 2013) and Ecotraining Pridelands Reserve, and sometimes in the Maasai Mara in Kenya when legalities and finances permit. Previous locations were Tswalu Game Reserve in the Kalahari, Karongwe Private Game Reserve and Arathusa. The first hour of the live drives were once broadcast by the South African Broadcasting Corporation, and the full drives have been broadcast in China by China Global Television Network from 15 August-15 September 2020.

On 25 August 2020, WildEarth have launched a TV channel dedicated to their live safari drives. The channel is currently only available in South Africa on DStv. WildEarth have also produced several shows for Nat Geo Wild from 2017 to 2019, including Predator Bloodlines and The Hyena Whisperer.

In 2021, the brand launched as an online channel through Xumo in the United States. Later on in the year, WildEarth launched an app on which people can watch the drives. The app has been made available on most mobile devices and smart TVs.

In 2022, the brand was made available on FAST channel's Plex platforms and RAD NFTV.

== Live drives ==
Every morning and evening (Central Africa Time), Wildearth broadcast 3-hour live drives that take place at Sabi Sands, Ngala, Phinda, Maasai Mara, and Pridelands. These drives feature trained safari guides (referred to as "naturalists" on the show) who take viewers around the area and also provide information about what is being seen, as well as a camera operator who films the plants and animals that are being shown during the drive. At one time, the start is of each drive was a 45-minute "Kids" segment, where children can ask question via emailing WildEarth. After this segment ends, a 2-hour 45-minute segment starts, where other viewers can ask question via the live-chat. These drives have been broadcast since 2007, and some older drives have been archived by viewers. This 45 minute kids segment was dropped on 1 July 2020 as many schools had closed due to the COVID-19 pandemic. WildEarth also upload highlights from drives (such as sightings of young animals or predator kills) onto their YouTube channel.

== Live camera ==
A live camera (Often referred to as the "Dam Cam" by fans of WildEarth) was set up near Vyutela Dam, located at Djuma Private Game Reserve in 1998. This live camera can be viewed on the Djuma Private Game Reserve YouTube Channel and is active for 24 hours a day. The camera is remotely operated by global volunteers known as "zoomies" and allows viewers to observe the local flora and fauna of the area. Highlights of individual animals (such as lions or elephants) that are seen on the camera can also be found on Djuma's official YouTube page.

== Animals ==
Animals that are seen on the WildEarth drives and live camera include a variety of birds, insects, antelope spotted hyenas, lions, leopard, hippopotamus and elephants. Rhinoceros are not shown on the broadcasts except for in Phinda and the Maasai Mara due to threat of poaching. As of August 2022, rhinos are shown on Sabi Sands, but only if they're de-horned. Plants are also shown and discussed as they are of importance to the ecosystem, and sometimes have medicinal properties.

Some animals featured on the live drives have been named by the guides, lodges and viewers. These include the hyenas, lions and leopards. Some named animals include Ribbon, Corky, Ntima, Ndebele (members of the Djuma hyena clan, with Ribbon as the former matriarch and June as the current matriarch), Tingana and Thandi (leopards). These names are used to help viewers and guides identify different animals featured on both the drives and live camera, and to also form a connection with the animals. Most of the animals are named when they are between five months to one year old.
