= Mahushe Shongwe Reserve =

- Interactive map of Mahushe Shongwe Reserve
- Location: Mpumalanga, South Africa
- Coordinates: 25.70658°S 31.70676°E
- Area: 1,139.59 hectares (2,816.0 acres)
- Created: 29 March 1996; 30 years ago
- Operator: Mpumalanga Tourism and Parks Agency
- Website: www.mpumalanga.com/our-provincial-parks/mahushe-shongwe-nature-reserve

Mahushe Shongwe Reserve is a park in Mpumalanga, South Africa.
