= Mthethomusha Game Reserve =

Protected area in Mpumalanga, South Africa

Coordinates: 25°26′S 31°17′E

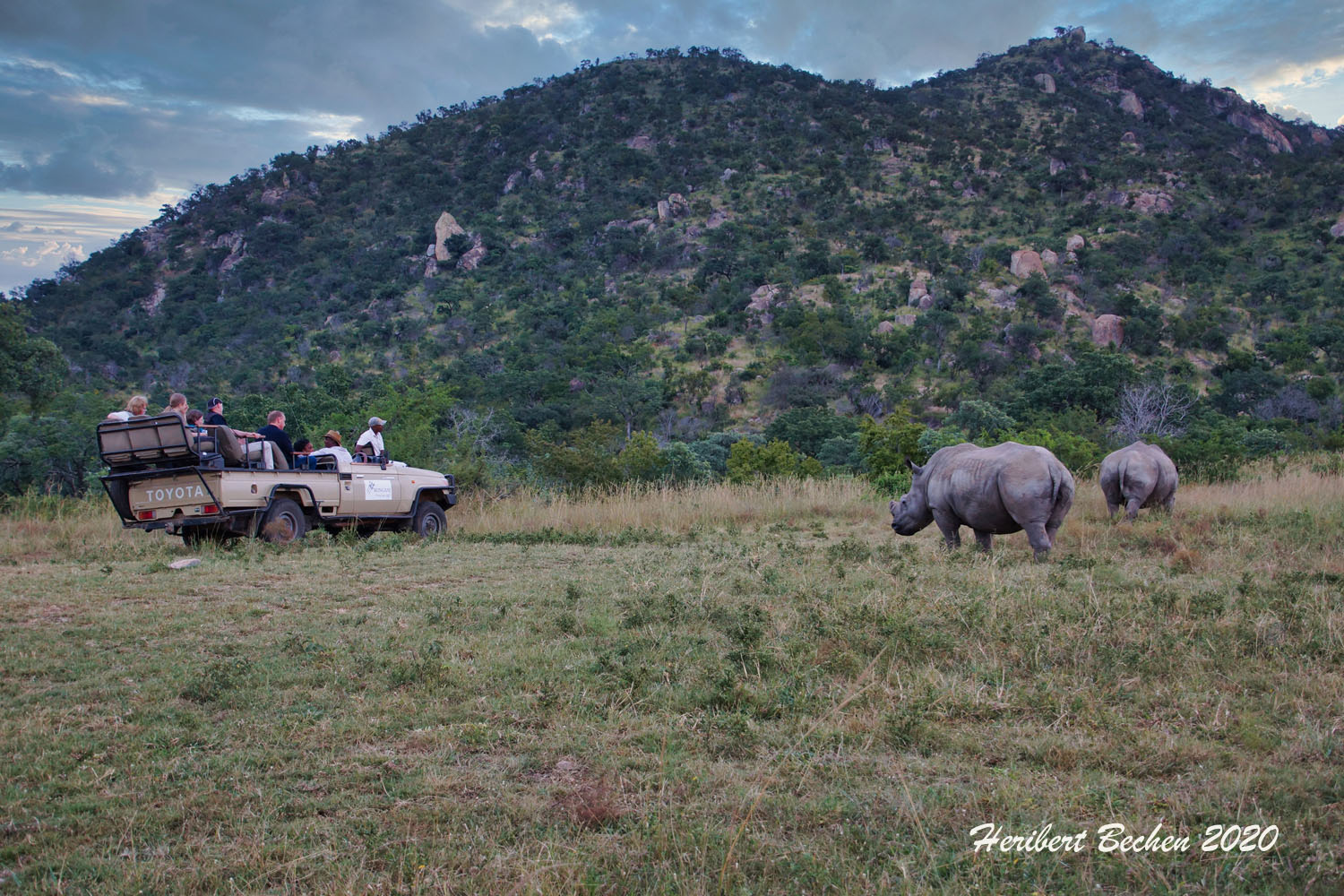
Safari vehicle with visitors in 2020

Mthethomusha Game Reserve is an 8,000-hectare (20,000-acre) protected area in Mpumalanga, South Africa, that borders Kruger National Park. Operated by the Mpumalanga Tourism and Parks Agency, Mthethomusha is home to the Mpakeni tribe that formerly owned the area before leasing it to the Agency in 1985. The protected area includes the villages of Luphisi (with a population of 6,000) and Mpakeni (4,500). Mthethomusha Game Reserve was known for its luxury lodge—Bongani Mountain Lodge. Opened in 1990, it was burned down on 31 January 2021 by furious individuals, ostensibly in protest against the death of a local poacher.
