= Rust De Winter Nature Reserve =

Nature reserve in South Africa

Rust de Winter Nature Reserve
- Interactive map of Rust de Winter Nature Reserve
- Location: Limpopo Province, South Africa
- Nearest city: Hammanskraal
- Coordinates: 25.227566°S 28.501063°E
- Area: 1,650 ha (4,100 acres)

Rust de Winter Nature Reserve encloses Rust de Winter Dam near Hammanskraal in the southern Limpopo province, South Africa.

== Wildlife ==
Game to be viewed include waterbuck, zebra, common warthog, aardvark, crocodile, bushpig and kudu. During summer, numerous migratory waders congregate on the gentle slopes of the reservoir's northern shores. Wood sandpiper is the most numerous species. Birds present in the surrounding grassland and woodland include buttonquail, penduline tit, crimson-breasted shrike and Burchell's starling.

== Incidents ==
In May 2025 the bodies of Aserie Ndlovu, a journalist and his partner, Zodwa Mdhluli were found in a thick bush outside Rust de Winter. The couple has been missing since 18 February 2025 in KwaMhlanga.

== Gallery ==
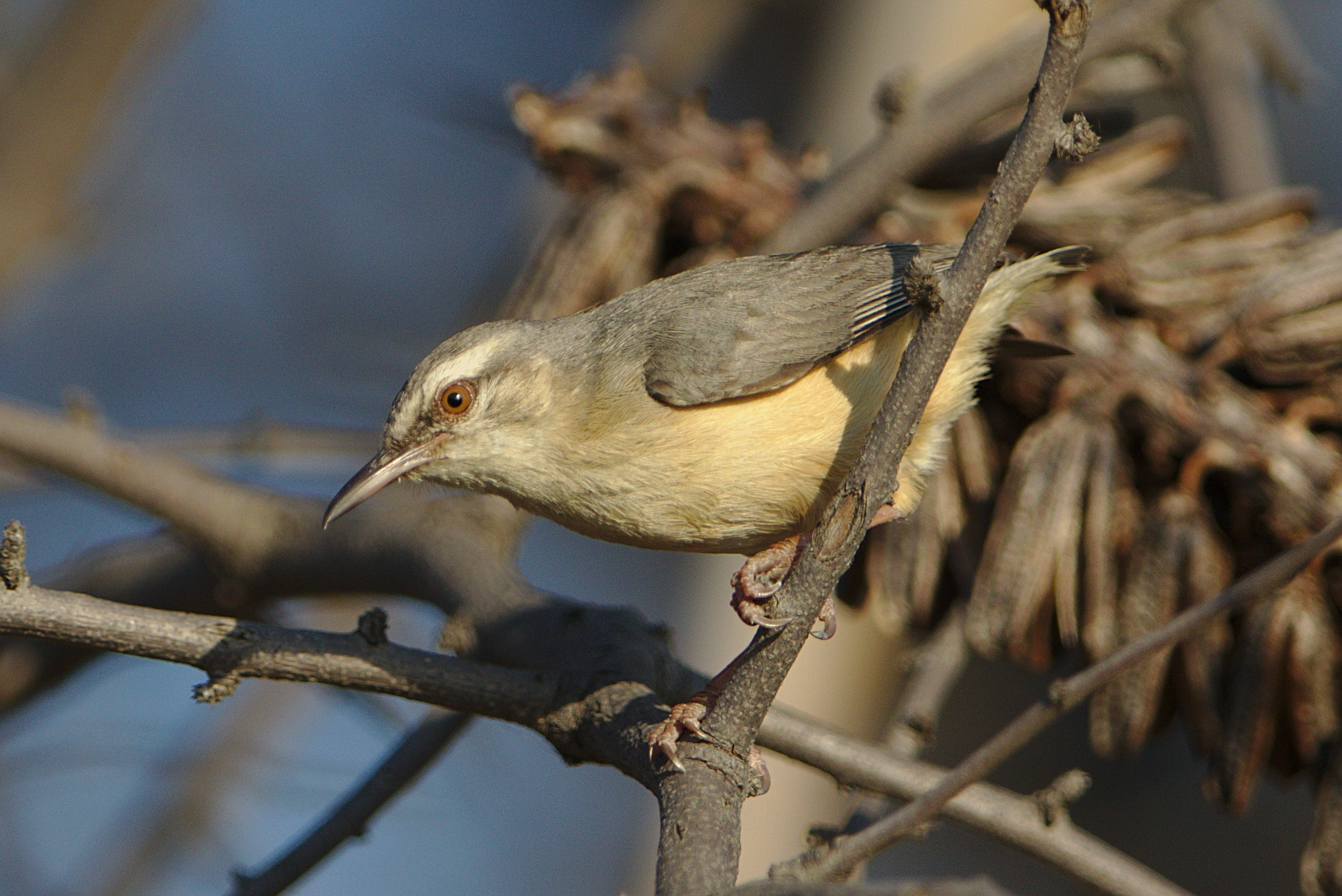
Long-billed crombec

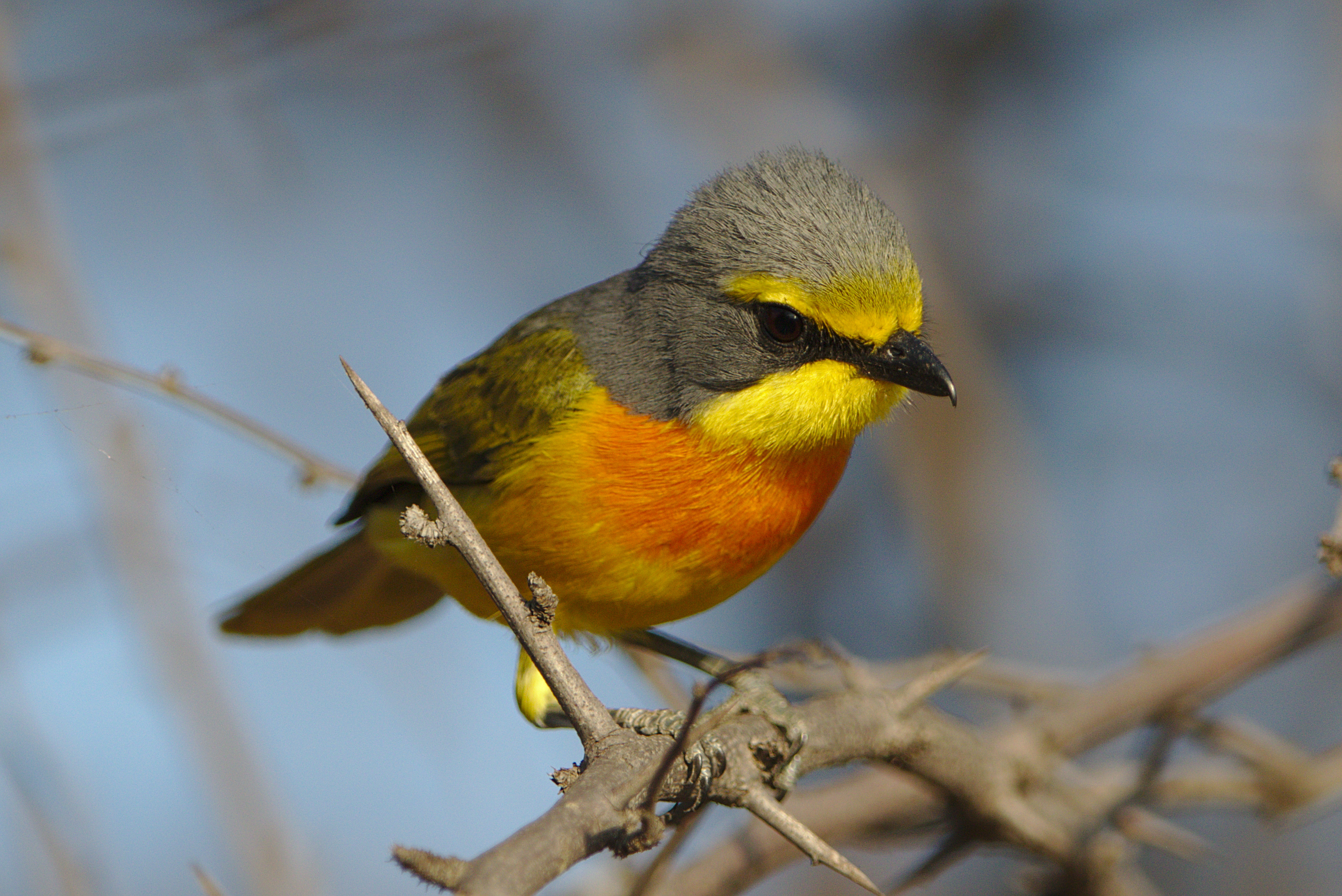
Orange-breasted bushshrike

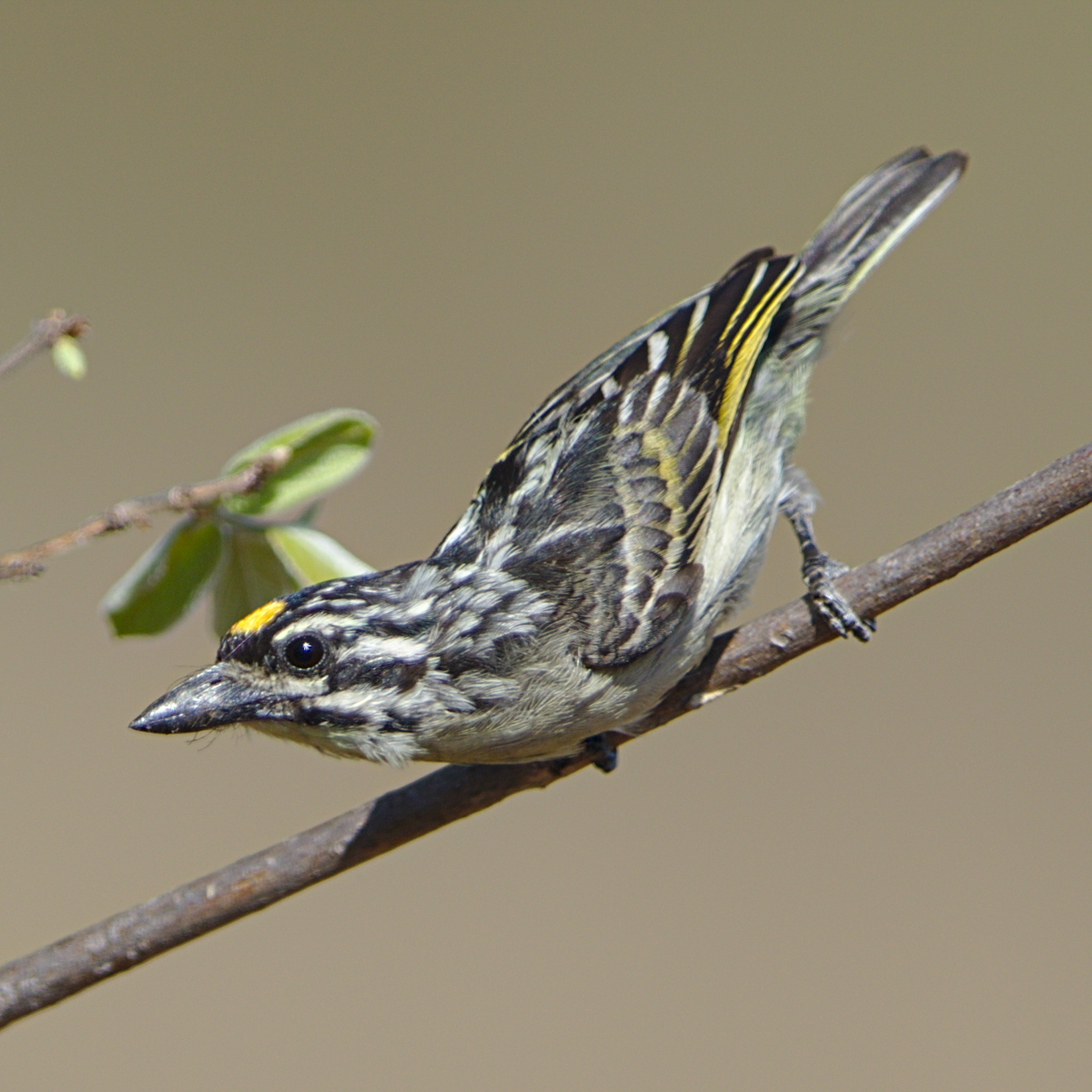
Yellow-fronted tinkerbird

== See also ==
- Protected areas of South Africa
