= Mala Mala Airport =

Mala Mala Airport Mala Mala Lughawe
- IATA: AAM; ICAO: FAMD

Summary
- Airport type: Public
- Location: Mala Mala
- Elevation AMSL: 1,079 ft / 329 m
- Coordinates: 24°49′05″S 31°32′41″E

Map
- Location in Mpumalanga AAM (South Africa)

Runways
Direction	Length		Surface
Direction	ft	m	Surface
16/34	4,145	1,263	Asphalt

Mala Mala Airport (IATA: AAM, ICAO: FAMD) is a small airport serving the Mala Mala Game Reserve in Mpumalanga, South Africa.

== Airlines and destinations ==
Airlines	Destinations
Federal Air	Johannesburg–O. R. Tambo
CemAir	Johannesburg–O. R. Tambo
