= Songimvelo Game Reserve =

Provincial park in South Africa

- Location within Mpumalanga
- Location: Mpumalanga; South Africa
- Nearest city: Barberton
- Coordinates: 25°55′45″S 31°3′15″E
- Area: 49,000 hectares (490 km^{2})
- Governing body: Mpumalanga Parks Board

Songimvelo Game Reserve is a provincial park managed by the Mpumalanga Parks Board in Mpumalanga, South Africa. Songimvelo is a plural word that means 'we are conserving nature' in the siSwati language.

This park forms part of the Songimvelo-Malolotja Transfrontier Conservation Area, a peace park on the border between South Africa and Eswatini. The park was declared a UNESCO World Heritage Site in 2018 as the landscape represents one of the best-preserved successions of volcanic and sedimentary rock, dating back 3.6 to 3.25 billion years. The park is also home to some of the world's oldest rock art.

== See also ==
- Mpumalanga Parks Board
- Protected areas of South Africa
