= Ulusaba Private Game Reserve =

Game reserve in South Africa

Coordinates: 24°47′42″S 31°20′39″E

Ulusaba Private Game Reserve logo

Ulusaba Private Game Reserve is a private game reserve of 13,500 ha (33,000 acres) in Sabi Sand Private Game Reserve. It borders Kruger National Park in South Africa's Mpumalanga province and is home to a diverse wildlife. Ulusaba means fearful in the local Tsonga (Shangaan) language and it was a name given to the Sabie River by the Shangaan people. The Sabie River was originally called Ulusaba (fearful river) by the Shangaan simply because there was once a large concentration of the Nile crocodile in the river. Before the establishment of Kruger National Park, Ulusaba was once a home of Tsonga-Shangaan people, the Shangaan were evicted from this land when Kruger National Park was established and were relocated in nearby villages adjacent Ulusaba Private Game Reserve.

One of a handful of private game lodges in the Sabi Sand area, it benefits from the recent removal of fences between private reserves and the greater Kruger National Park. This creates a much larger contiguous body of land available to wildlife in the area.

In 2007, the Nxumalo community made a land restitution claim involving 700 km^{2} (270 sq mi) of nature reserve land. The claimants hope to settle the claim with a joint venture between Virgin Limited Edition and the newly registered Nxumalo Conservation Trust.

== Wildlife ==
Wildlife species include the Big five game: African bush elephant, lion, African leopard, rhinoceros (southern white rhinoceros as well as south-central black rhinoceros), and African buffalo. In addition to the "Big Five", a multitude of other mammals such as the African wild dog, South African giraffe, blue wildebeest, spotted hyena, hippopotamus, plains zebra, cheetah roam in this reserve.

== See also ==
- Associated Private Nature Reserves
