= Songimvelo-Malolotja Transfrontier Conservation Area =

Peace park on the South Africa - Swaziland border between Barberton and Pigg's Peak

The Songimvelo-Malolotja Transfrontier Censervation Area is a peace park located on the South Africa - Eswatini border between Barberton (South Africa) and Pigg's Peak (Eswatini) and covers an area of approximately 700 square kilometres (270 sq mi), with potential extensions of another 500 square kilometres (190 sq mi).

The core of the park is to be the 49,000 hectares (190 sq mi) Songimvelo Game Reserve in South Africa and the 18,000 hectares (69 sq mi) Malolotja Nature Reserve in Eswatini. These parks share a common border. On the Eswatini side are three protection-worthy areas, namely the Bulembu National Landscape, Makhonjwa National Landscape, and the Sondeza National Landscape.

The long-term plan is that this Transfrontier Conservation Area is to be incorporated as part of the Greater Lubombo Transfrontier Conservation Area.
