= Graytown =

Graytown may refer to:

- Graytown, Ohio, United States
- Graytown, Victoria, Australia
- Graytown, Wisconsin, United States

== See also ==
- Gray town, places in the United States that forbade non-white people after dark
- Greytown (disambiguation)
