= Rhenosterkop Dam =

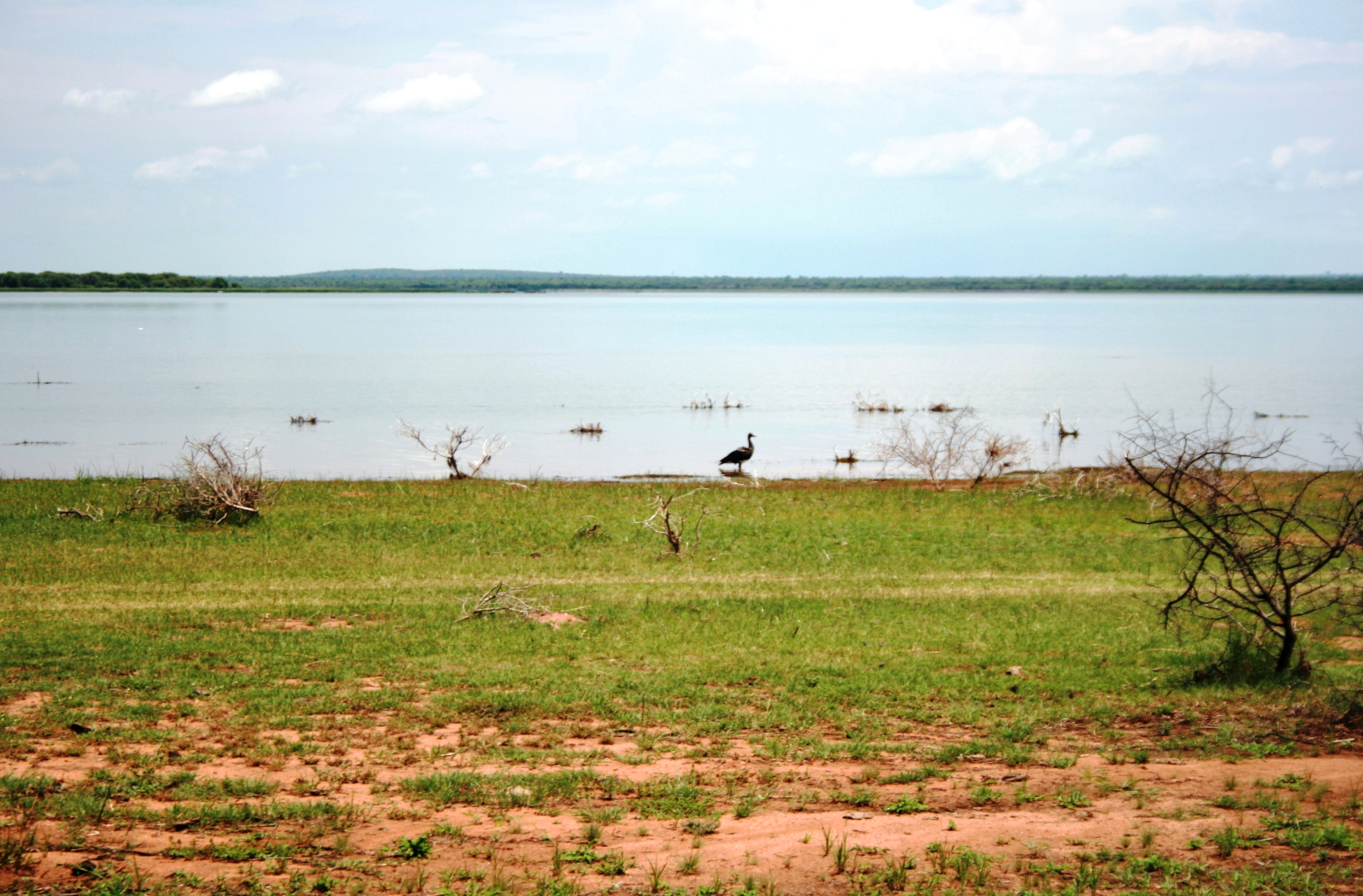
- Shoreline of the reservoir
- Interactive map of Rhenosterkop Dam
- Official name: Rhenosterkop Dam
- Country: South Africa
- Location: Mpumalanga
- Coordinates: 25°05′45″S 28°55′00″E
- Purpose: Industrial and domestic
- Opening date: 1984
- Owner: Department of Water Affairs

Dam and spillways
- Type of dam: Arch-gravity dam
- Impounds: Elands River (Olifants)
- Height: 36 metres (118 ft)
- Length: 515 metres (1,690 ft)

Reservoir
- Creates: Rhenosterkop Dam Reservoir
- Total capacity: 206 000 000 m^{3}
- Catchment area: 3 723 km^{2}
- Surface area: 3 624 ha

Rhenosterkop Dam is combined gravity and arch type dam in Mpumalanga Province, South Africa. It is located on the Elands River, part of the Olifants River basin. The dam was established in 1984.

The dam mainly serves for municipal and industrial use and its hazard potential has been ranked high (3). The reservoir with adjacent land is contained in Mkhombo Nature Reserve.

== See also ==
- List of reservoirs and dams in South Africa
