= Mkhombo Nature Reserve =

Protected area in Mpumalanga, South Africa

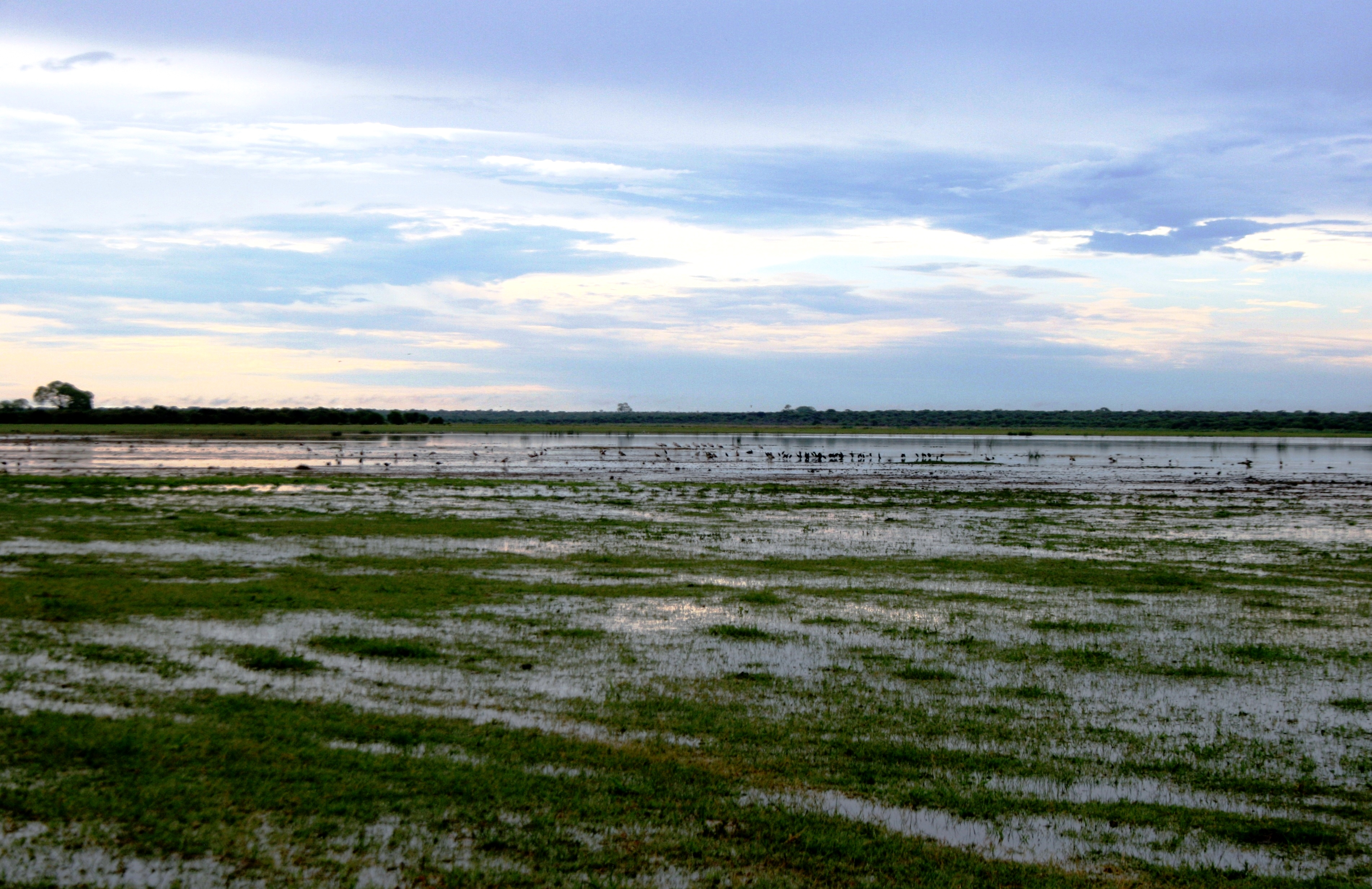
- Flooded shoreline after a downpour
- Interactive map of Mkhombo Nature Reserve
- Location: Mpumalanga, South Africa
- Coordinates: 25.114°S 28.825°E

Mkhombo Nature Reserve is a protected area in Mpumalanga, South Africa. It is a large, 11,223 ha reserve which conserves an easterly Kalahari thornveld environment around the shores of Mkhombo Dam. The reserve has typical highland grassland with a network of wetlands and rocky outcrops.

The nature reserve is known for its bird life. Among the species native to the reserve are the reed cormorant, African yellow-billed hornbill, African grey hornbill, white-breasted cormorant, little swift, hamerkop, red-winged starling, pectoral sandpiper, grey plover, barred wren-warbler, and yellow wagtail.

It is a frequent safari destination for visitors from around the world. Species found in the reserve include elephants, lions, leopards, cheetahs, buffaloes, rhinoceroses, hippopotamuses, and several antelope species.
