= Muntu Nxumalo =

South African singer (born 1957)

Muntu Nxumalo (born 1957) is a South African singer.

== Imprisonment ==
Nxumalo was born and raised in Durban, South Africa. In 1977 he joined Umkhonto weSizwe (or "MK"), the military wing of the African National Congress. The following year he was arrested, charged with treason and attempted murder, and sentenced to 22 years at Robben Island Prison, where he was incarcerated from 30 November 1978 to 27 April 1991.
