= Londolozi Private Game Reserve =

Private Game Reserve

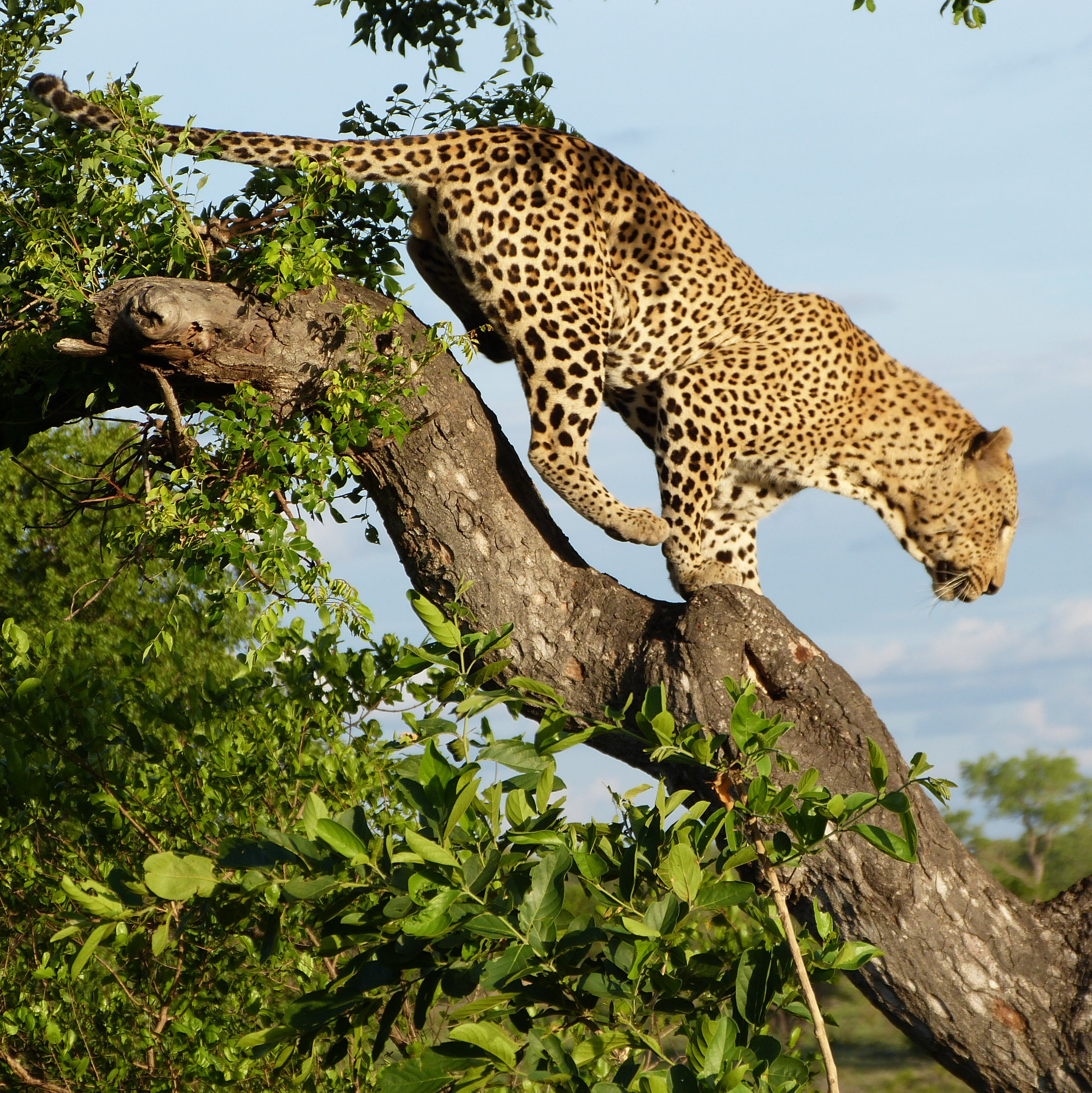
Londolozi Game Reserve is famous for its leopard population.

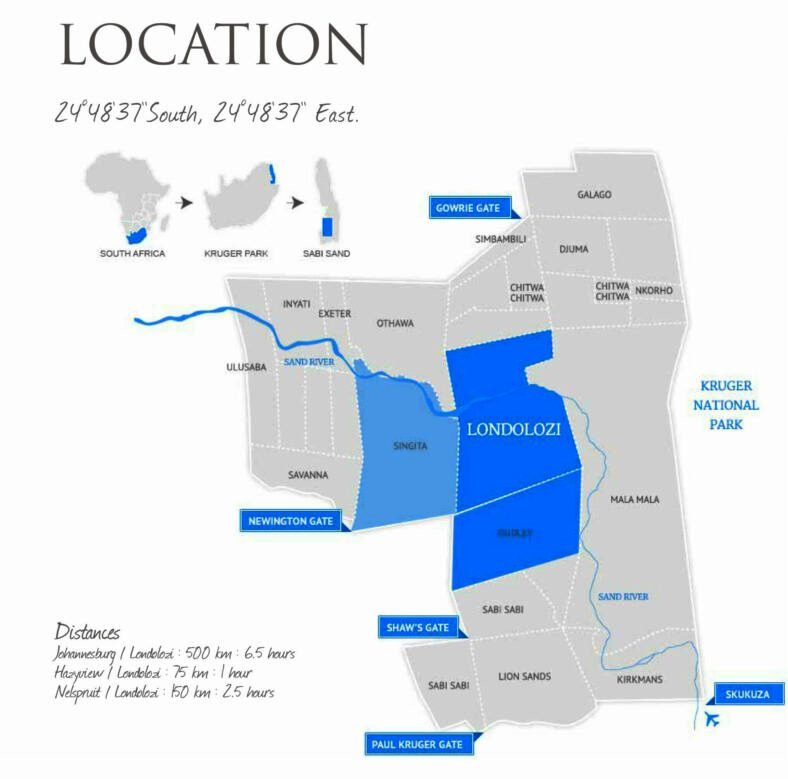
Londolozi Game Reserve map and its surroundings.

Londolozi Private Game Reserve is a large game reserve, with 150 km^{2} (58 sq mi) of land in northeastern South Africa. This means 1 bed per 167 hectares of land. Londolozi Rangers are not bound by Kruger Park rules and can therefore drive off-road on safari and conduct comprehensive bush walks into the wilderness. The reserve is part of the Sabi Sand Private Game Reserve, situated on the western border of Kruger National Park, which together with some other parks make up the Great Limpopo Transfrontier Park. Londolozi is a Zulu word meaning "Protector of all Living Things". Wildlife in this reserve includes the Big Five of Africa (lions, leopards, black rhinoceros, African bush elephant and African buffalo).

The reserve was established in 1926 by Frank Unger and Charles Boyd Varty. The land, named Sparta Farm, was bought from Transvaal Consolidated Investments (TCI). Sparta was used as a hunting farm until 1971 when Charles Varty's two sons, Dave Varty and John Varty, shifted the focus of the property to ecotourism and photographic safaris instead of hunting. Londolozi is part of the GLTFCA - the Greater Limpopo Transfrontier Conservation Association

The game reserve has five camps situated next to each other along the banks of the Sand River. In 2014, Condé Nast Traveler readers voted Londolozi as the best hotel and resort in the world. The reserve has been lauded internationally for its far-sighted and progressive land and wildlife management, as well as its productive community involvement. In 1993, Londolozi became the first game reserve in the world to be accorded Relais & Châteaux status

In 1992, Nelson Mandela visited Londolozi for a period following his release from prison.
