= Singita =

South African game lodge brand

Coordinates: 24°47′13″S 31°25′28″E

Singita Management Company (Pty) Ltd
- Trade name: Singita
- Type: Private
- Industry: Tourism
- Founded: 1993; 33 years ago
- Headquarters: Cape Town, Western Cape, South Africa
- Number of locations: 15 game lodges (2023)
- Website: singita.com

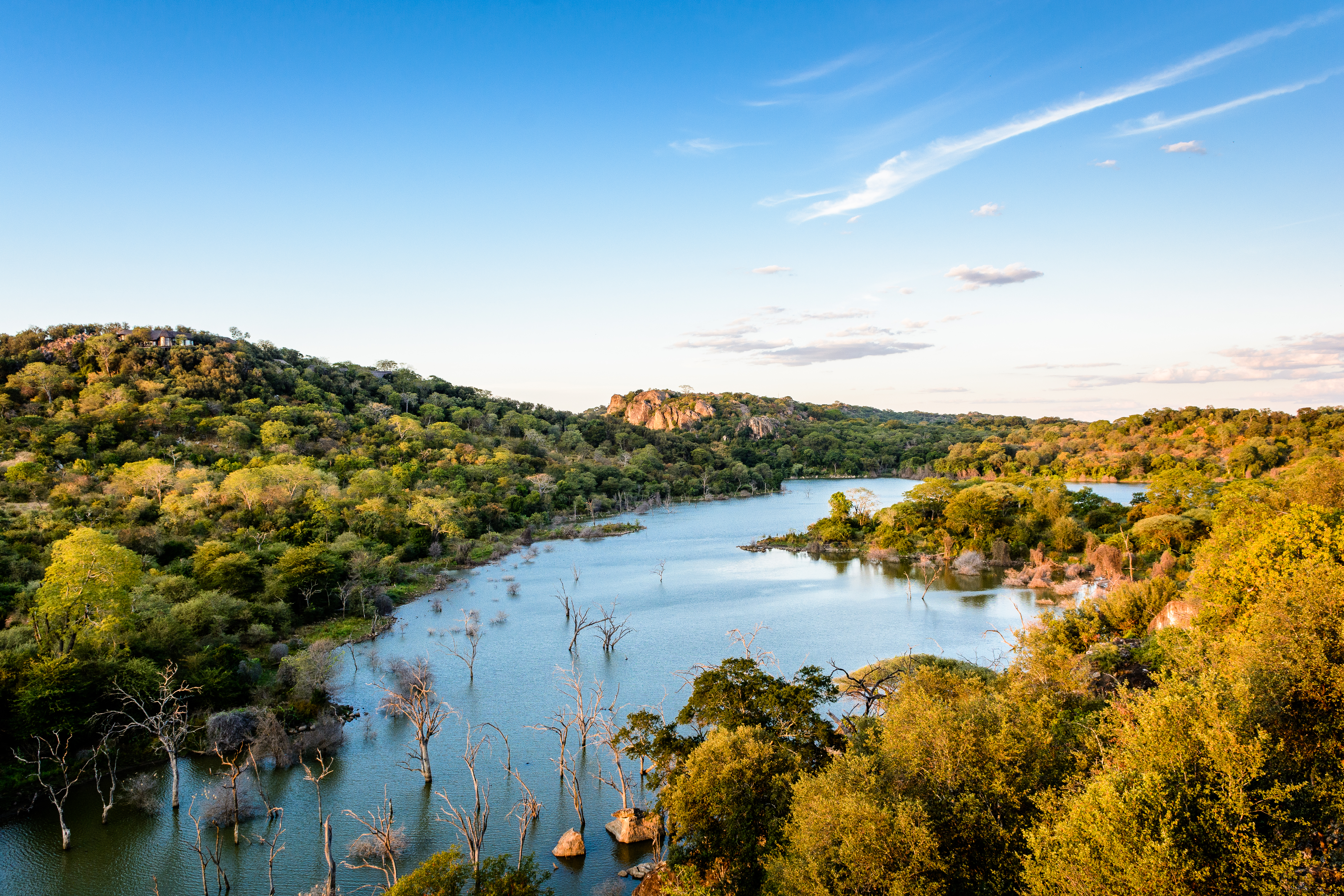
A view of Malilangwe Dam near Pamushana Lodge in Malilangwe Wildlife Reserve, Zimbabwe

Singita is a South African luxury ecotourism and conservation brand which operates private game lodges in South Africa, Zimbabwe, Tanzania, and Rwanda, across the Sabi Sand Game Reserve, Kruger National Park, Malilangwe Wildlife Reserve, Grumeti Game Reserve, Serengeti National Park, and Volcanoes National Park.

== History ==
Singita is a Tsonga word that means "place of miracles".

Singita began in 1925 when Luke Bailes' grandfather bought a piece of land in what would later become the Sabi Sand Game Reserve in South Africa. The 45,000 acre reserve contains Singita’s first lodge, Singita Ebony Lodge, which opened in 1993. Singita now manages 16 lodges and camps across six game reserves.

== Accommodation ==
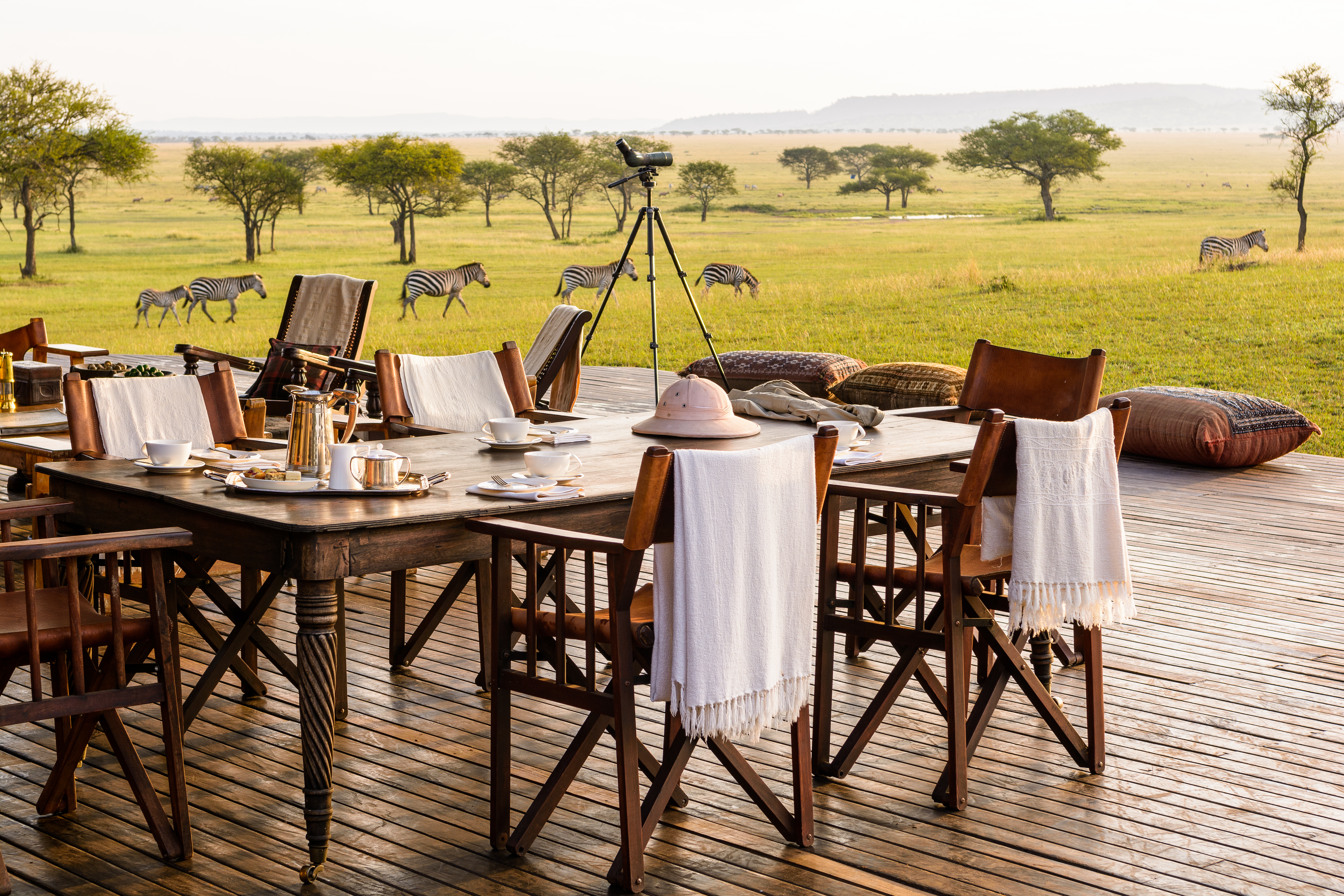
Sabora Tented Camp in Serengeti National Park, Tanzania

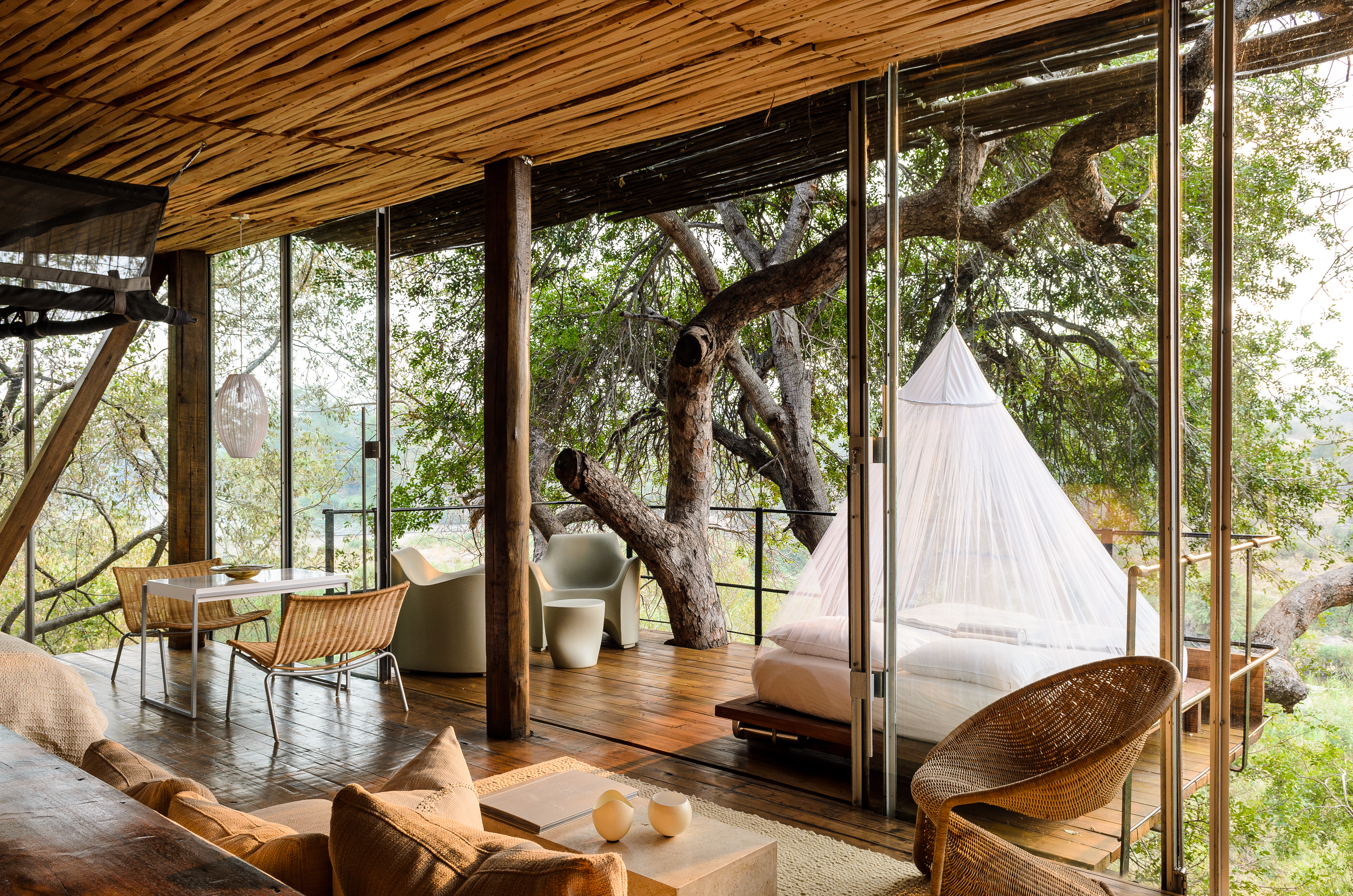
Lebombo Lodge in Kruger National Park, South Africa

=== South Africa ===
==== Kruger National Park ====
- Singita Lebombo Lodge
- Singita Sweni Lodge

==== Singita Sabi Sand ====
- Singita Ebony Lodge
- Singita Castleton
- Singita Boulders Lodge

=== Tanzania ===
- Singita Sasakwa Lodge
- Singita Sabora Tented Camp
- Singita Faru Faru Lodge
- Singita Serengeti House
- Singita Explore
- Singita Mara River Tented Camp
- Singita Milele

=== Zimbabwe ===
- Singita Pamushana Lodge
- Singita Malilangwe House

=== Rwanda ===
- Singita Kwitonda Lodge
- Singita Kataza House
