= Wonderboy Nxumalo =

South African artist

Wonderboy Nxumalo (1975 – August 3, 2008) was a South African artist associated with the Ardmore Ceramics workshop.

== Early life ==
Wonderboy (Thokozani) Nxumalo was born in Greytown, KwaZulu-Natal, the son of Glodia Kanyile, a housekeeper. He attended Candabuthule High School there. His mother's employer knew of the boy's artistic talent, and referred him to Fée Halsted-Berning of the Ardmore Ceramics workshop. He later had training in printmaking through the Caversham Press Education Trust.

== Career ==
In 1994, Nxumalo joined the Ardmore Ceramics workshop. He quickly developed his own style in painting ceramics, with poetry, slogans, and anecdotes threaded around and through the images, and frequent use of a sgraffito technique. His subjects tended to more historical events and current issues than those of his more folklore-inspired colleagues, with pieces about the Anglo-Zulu War and the AIDS epidemic. Monkeys and rabbits act like humans in his illustrations, usually with whimsical effect. He traveled to Wales to represent Ardmore at the International Ceramics Festival in Aberystwyth in 2001.

== Death and legacy ==
Nxumalo died at home in Greytown in 2008, from illness caused by HIV/AIDS. He was 33 years old. Posthumous exhibits of his works included a gallery show in Pietermaritzburg in 2009, Boston University and the Istanbul Biennale in 2011, the Gerisch Museum in 2013, and the Reina Sofia Museum in 2014. Sales of fabric printed with Nxumalo-inspired designs raise funds for his mother and for a local orphanage, Khazimula.
