= Djuma Game Reserve =

Coordinates: 24°42′27″S 31°32′08″E

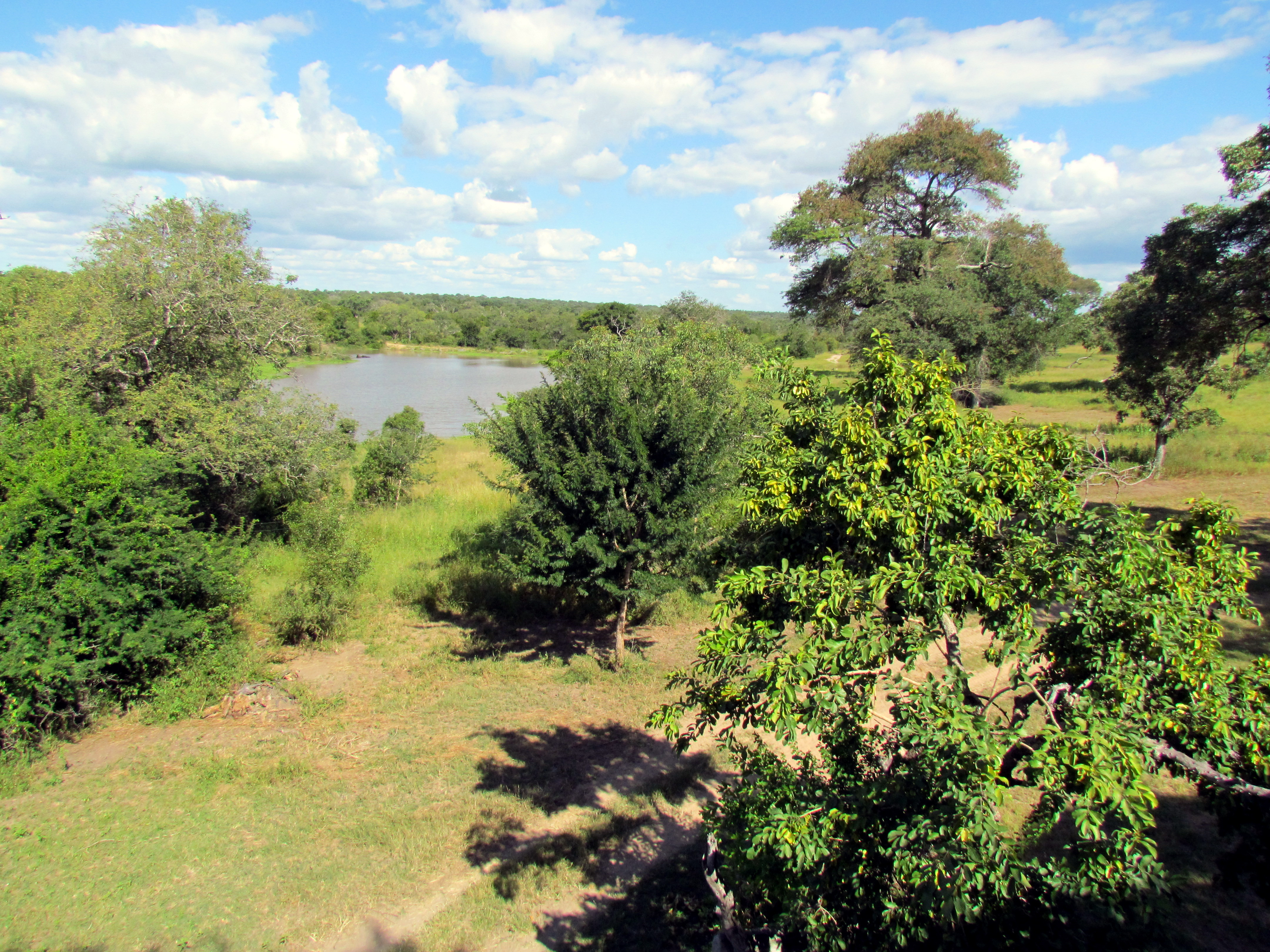
View on a dam near Djuma Game Reserve's Vuyatela Lodge

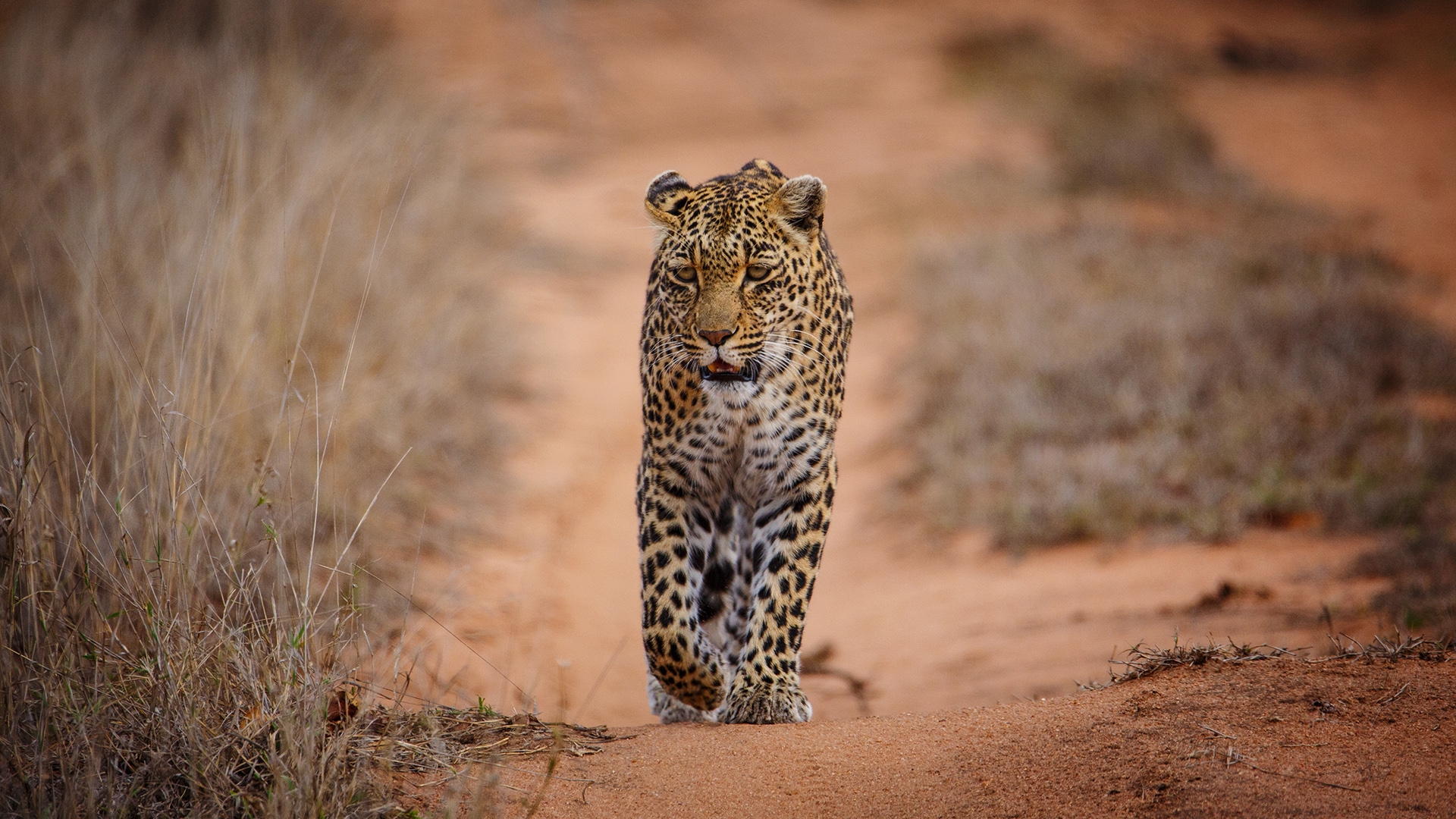
The female African Leopard "Thandi" in the Djuma reserve

Djuma Game Reserve, is a 1,200 ha private game reserve, which is part of the Sabi Sand Game Reserve, Mpumalanga Province, South Africa. It is situated on the western border of the Kruger National Park, which together with some other parks make up the Greater Kruger National Park. The border with the Kruger National Park is unfenced. The name Djuma refers to the roar of a lion.

== Fauna ==
The fauna includes the Big Five, as well as Impala, Kudu, Hippopotamus, Hyena, and a great number of birds, reptiles and insects. The wildlife can be viewed on a website, WildEarth.tv, as well as on YouTube, Twitch, Twitter and Facebook. The website offers a live camera on the Djuma area near Gowrie Dam which is remotely operated by volunteers around the world, as well as 3 hour live game drives that are streamed twice a day by South African company WildEarth. Both the camera and drives feature a live chat, allowing viewers to discuss the wildlife in the area, and to ask questions about the wildlife during the drives. Questions are relayed to the guides via the company's FC (Final Control) team.

== See also ==
- Kruger National Park
