= Greytown, South Africa =

Greytown
- Location within KwaZulu-Natal Location within South Africa
- Coordinates: 29°04′S 30°35′E
- Country: South Africa
- Province: KwaZulu-Natal
- District: Umzinyathi
- Municipality: Umvoti
- Established: 1854

Area
  - Total: 4.75 km^{2} (1.83 sq mi)

Population (2011)
  - Total: 9,090
  - Density: 1,910/km^{2} (4,960/sq mi)

Racial makeup (2011)
  - Black African: 60.1%
  - Coloured: 5.5%
  - Indian/Asian: 22.3%
  - White: 11.2%
  - Other: 1.0%

First languages (2011)
  - Zulu: 53.1%
  - English: 36.9%
  - Afrikaans: 5.2%
  - Other: 4.8%
- Time zone: UTC+2 (SAST)
- Postal code (street): 3250
- PO box: 3250
- Area code: 033
- Website: www.greytown.co.za

Greytown is a town situated on the banks of a tributary of the uMvoti River in a richly fertile timber-producing area of KwaZulu-Natal, South Africa.

== History ==
Greytown was established in the 1850s and named after the governor of the Cape Colony Sir George Edward Grey who later became Premier of New Zealand. A Lutheran church was built in 1854. A church bell which was brought to the town for the Dutch Reformed Church in 1861 to summon worshipers. The Dutch and English congregations were the centre of a series of theological arguments and the church bell was stolen and buried, only to be found 74 years later upon the construction of some cottages near the old church. A strikingly designed Town Hall was opened in 1904. In 1906, following a poll tax and other oppressive measures imposed on the Zulus, the Bambatha Rebellion took place.

The final resting place of Sarie Marais is at Greytown. Sarie was a legendary Voortrekker woman who died, aged 37, with the birth of her 11th child and is immortalised by the eponymous song, an indelible part of South African culture. Louis Botha, the Second Boer War General and first Prime Minister of the Union of South Africa, was born on a farm 5 km south of Greytown. The old farmhouse was destroyed by British Forces during search and destroy operations. Louis Botha led the Boer forces during their victory over the British at the Battle of Spion Kop.

== Notable people ==
- Jabulile Majola, musician
- Wonderboy Nxumalo, artist

== Education ==
Greytown contains several schools:

- Wembley College, a private school close to the centre of the town. Possesses a boarding establishment, and uses the Cambridge system. Currently headed by William Silk, a renowned musician and conductor.
- Greytown High School.
- Greytown Primary School.
- Kammaland Primary School.

Deutsche Schule Hermannsburg, a private school 25 kilometres (16 mi) away from Greytown, offers a bus service for students who reside in Greytown.

== Politics ==
- Greytown (House of Assembly of South Africa constituency)
