= Rust de Winter Dam =

- Interactive map of Rust de Winter Dam
- Official name: Rust de Winter Dam
- Country: South Africa
- Location: Limpopo
- Coordinates: 25°14′0″S 28°31′5″E
- Purpose: Irrigation
- Opening date: 1920
- Owner: Department of Water Affairs

Dam and spillways
- Type of dam: Rock filling
- Impounds: Elands River
- Height: 31 m
- Length: 271 m

Reservoir
- Creates: Rust de Winter Dam Reservoir
- Total capacity: 28 091 000 m^{3}
- Surface area: 473.3 ha

The Rust de Winter Dam is a dam located on the Elands River, Limpopo, South Africa.

== History ==
It was established in 1920 and has a capacity of 28 million m^{3} behind a wall of 31 m. The dam is used for irrigation of farms. The name has its origin from when cattle were brought up from the Highveld for grazing in the winter.

== See also ==
- List of reservoirs and dams in South Africa
- List of rivers of South Africa

== Sources ==
- List of South African Dams from the Department of Water Affairs
- Department of Water Affairs list of existing dams, October 2011, visited 10 June 2013
