= Mala Mala Game Reserve =

Game reserve in Mpumalanga, South Africa

Coordinates: 24°48′02″S 31°32′29″E

MalaMala Game Reserve is a 13,500-hectare private game reserve in Mpumalanga, South Africa, adjacent to the western boundary of Kruger National Park. It forms part of the broader Greater Kruger conservation landscape. MalaMala Game Reserve shares a 19-kilometre unfenced boundary with Kruger National Park, allowing wildlife to move between the reserve and the national park.

Leopard at MalaMala Game Reserve

MalaMala Game Reserve lies along the perennial Sand River, with approximately 27 kilometres of Sand River frontage. The river is an important feature of the reserve's landscape and wildlife habitat. The name MalaMala is derived from Tsonga/Xitsonga and refers to the sable antelope, reflecting the species' historical presence in the area.

== History ==
MalaMala's history as a private wildlife property dates back to 1927. It developed as a private hunting and safari destination, and subsequently became one of the early pioneers of photographic wildlife tourism.

The land was the subject of a land restitution claim. In 2013, the South African government announced an agreement settling the claim over MalaMala land, to the CPA (Communal Property Association), on behalf of the claimant communities.

The land was formally handed over in a ceremonial event to the CPA in January 2014. The restitution transferred ownership of the land, while arrangements were made for the continued operation of the safari business through a partnership structure.

In 2016, a partnership involving the CPA, Michael Rattray and Stephen Saad were established for the continued operation of MalaMala Game Reserve, allowing the community to retain the benefits of ownership while the property continued operating as a wildlife tourism destination.

Today, MalaMala Game Reserve forms part of Tengile MalaMala Collection, which operates under community ownership and shared stewardship, partnership and respect for nature.

Lioness at MalaMala Game reserve

== Wildlife ==
MalaMala Game Reserve is home to a variety of wildlife, including the Big Five: African elephant, lion, leopard, African buffalo and rhinoceros. Other species recorded in the reserve include cheetah, spotted hyena, African wild dog, hippopotamus, giraffe, blue wildebeest, zebra, impala, kudu and sable antelope. Its location along the Sand River and varied habitats support this diversity.

== Accommodation ==
MalaMala Game Reserve currently contains three safari properties:

- MalaMala Camp
- Sable Camp
- Rattray's Lodge

The Tengile MalaMala Collection currently lists all three as properties within MalaMala Game Reserve.

The nearest airport is Mala Mala Airport and regular commercial flights can be boarded from Skukuza Airport or Kruger Mpumalanga International Airport.

== See also ==
- Safari park
- Sabi Sand Game Reserve
- Kruger National Park
