= Sabi Sand Game Reserve =

Reserve in South Africa

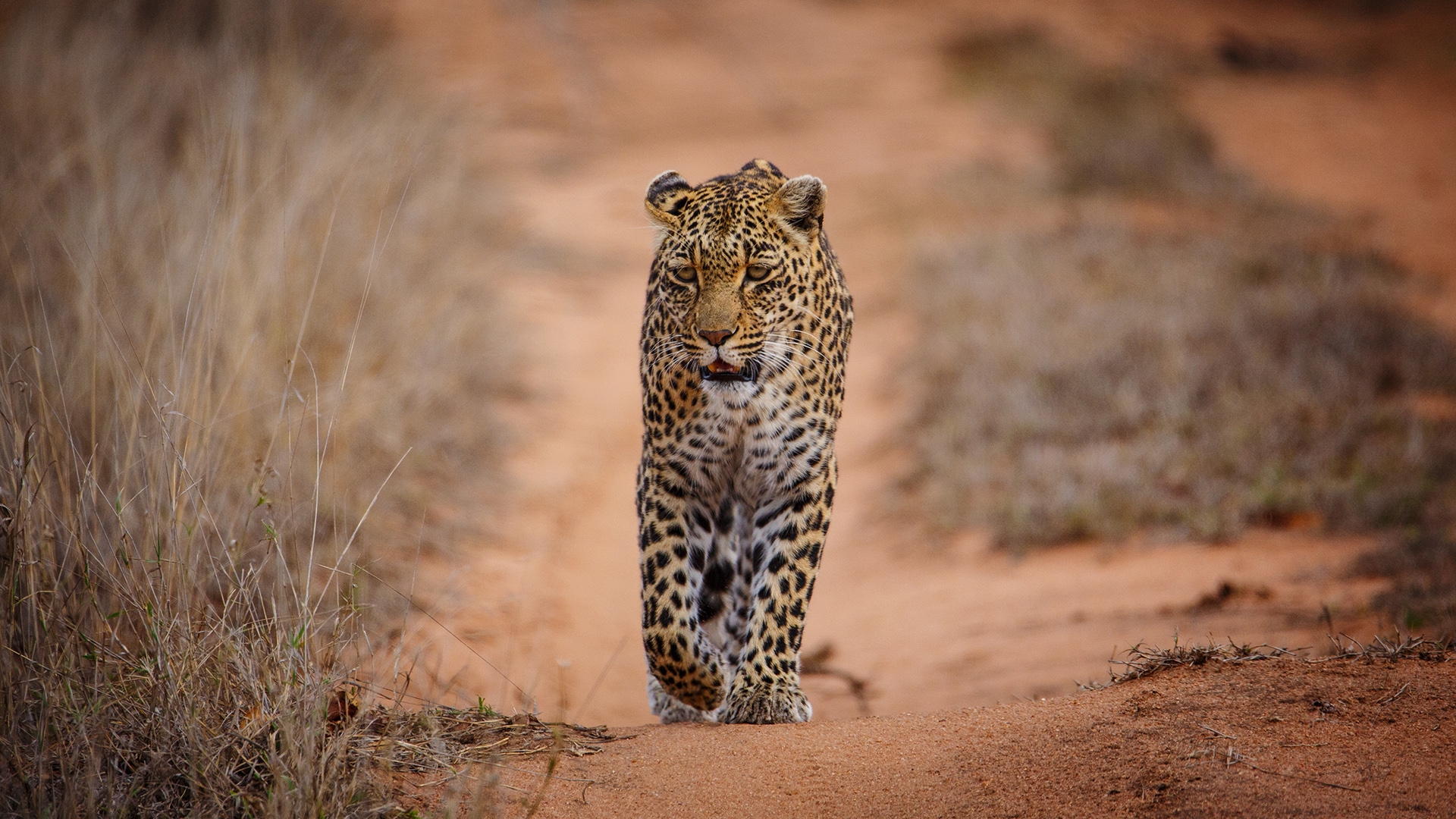
- The female African Leopard "Thandi" in the Djuma concession of the Sabi Sand reserve
- Sabi Sand Game Reserve Map
- Location: Mpumalanga, South Africa
- Coordinates: 24°48′02″S 31°32′29″E
- Area: 650 km^{2} (250 sq mi)
- Established: 1948
- Governing body: Sabi Sand Wildtuin (SSW)
- Sabi Sand Game Reserve (Mpumalanga) Sabi Sand Game Reserve (South Africa)

Sabi Sand Game Reserve consists of a group of private game reserves located adjacent to the Kruger National Park in the Lowveld of Mpumalanga, South Africa. Its name comes from the Sabie River on its southern boundary and the Sand River flowing through it. The area of the reserve is around 623–650 km^{2} (241–251 sq mi).

Reserves in Sabi Sand include Buffelshoek, Djuma Game Reserve, Elephant Plains, Cheetah Plains, Mala Mala Game Reserve, Chitwa Chitwa, Nkorho, Simbambili, Arathusa, Londolozi Private Game Reserve, Umzumbe, Nottens, Sabi Sabi, Lion Sands Reserve, Kirkman's Kamp, Singita, Exeter Leadwood, Inyati Game Lodge, Idube, Dulini, Leopard Hills, Savanna and Ulusaba Private Game Reserve.

== Wildlife ==
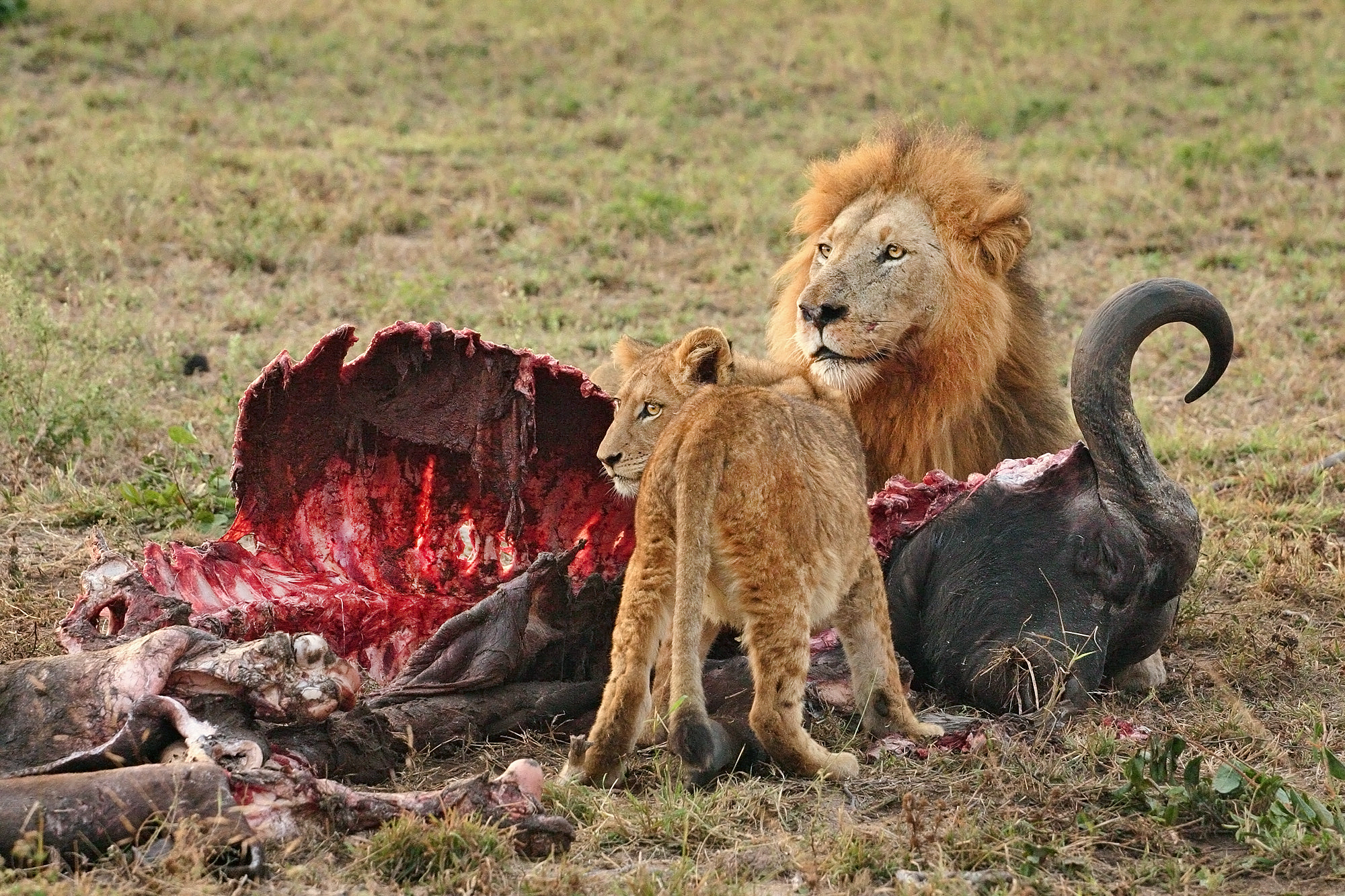
A male lion and cub eating a Cape buffalo in Northern Sabi Sand

Some of the species roaming in this game reserve includes the Big five game. Other animals that roam this reserve are the cheetah, hippopotamus, wildebeest, zebra, giraffe, hyena, and Cape wild dog. The reserve shares thousands of different plant varieties and all animal species with the Kruger National Park. It is home to 45 fish species, 500 bird species, 145 animal species, and 110 reptile species.

== See also ==
- Lower Sabie
- Mapogo lion coalition
- Wildlife of South Africa
